= Siege of Silistra (1809) =

1809 battle during the Russo-Turkish War

- Part of the Russo-Turkish War (1806–1812)
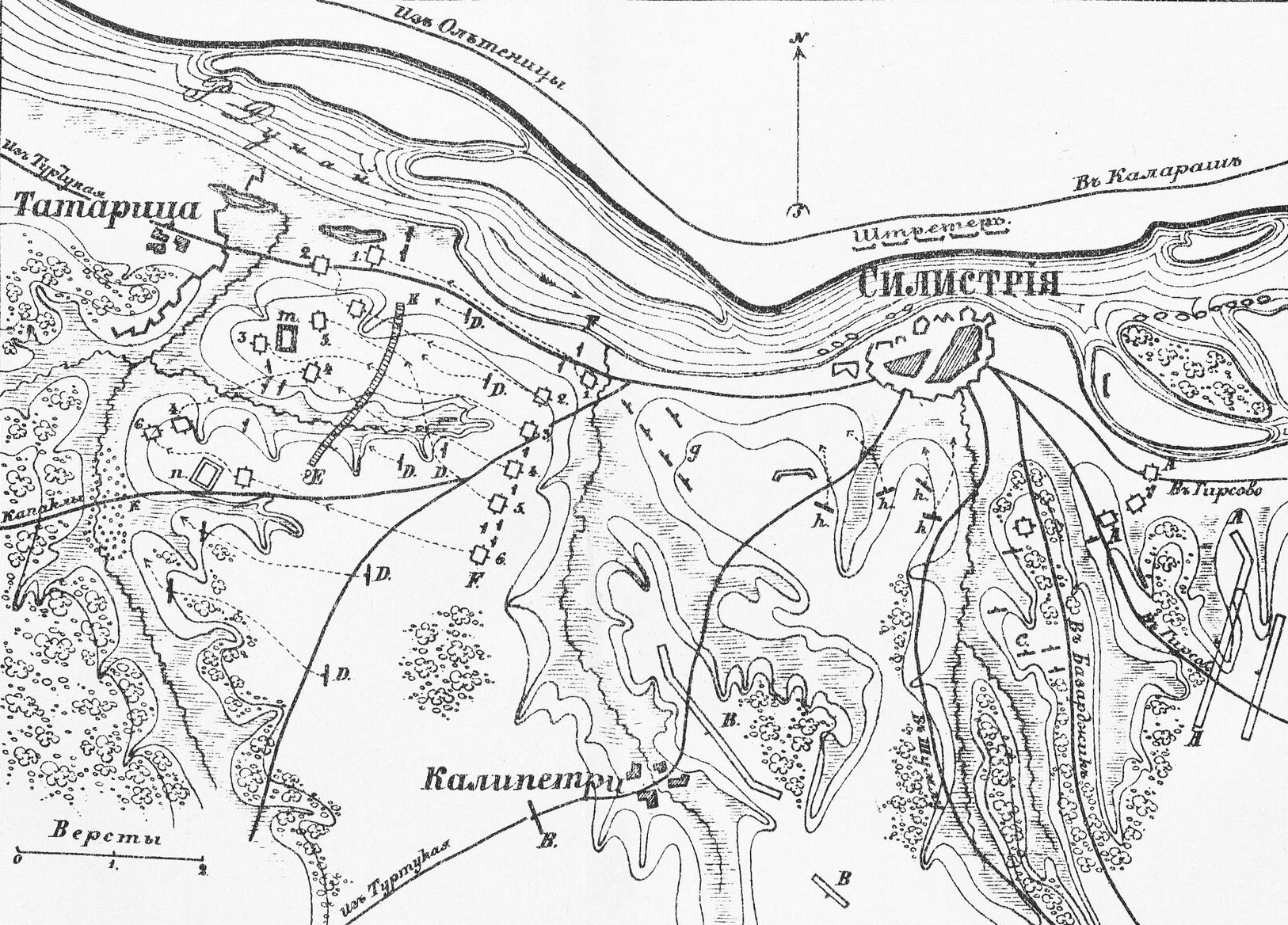
- Plan of the battle of Silistria and Tataritsa in 1809
Date	11 September – 14 October 1809
Location	Silistra, Ottoman Empire
Result	Ottoman victory

Belligerents
Ottoman Empire	Russia

Commanders and leaders
(Ottoman Empire) Yılıkoğlu Süleyman Ağa (Ottoman Empire) Pehlivan Ibrahim Pasha	(Russian Empire) Pyotr Bagration (Russian Empire) Matvei Platov (Russian Empire) Louis de Langeron

Strength
11,000–12,000 garrison	20,000 soldiers

Casualties and losses
~1,600	Unknown

The Siege of Silistra (Note: Turkish: Silistre Kuşatması Russian: Осада Силистрии Bulgarian: Обсада на Силистра) is part of the Russo-Turkish War of 1806-1812. Russian troops, under the command of Pyotr Bagration, besieged the fortress of Silistra, whose garrison was commanded by Ilk Oglu. The siege itself lasted from September 11 to October 14 according to the old calendar.

In October, an army under the command of the serasker Pehvelin Ibrahim Pasha arrived to relieve the siege. Encountering the Russian army near the village of Tataritsa, a battle ensued. During the battle, the Russians repelled all attacks and prevented the direct lifting of the siege of Silistra, but the Turkish positions were not destroyed. By then, another army, under the Grand Vizier Kör Yusuf Ziyayuddin Pasha, was heading towards Silistra. This forced Bagration to lift the siege of Silistra and withdraw across the Danube.

== Background ==
Following the defeat of Russian troops at Brăila and the death of Alexander Prozorovsky, Pyotr Bagration was appointed commander of the Danube Army on August 11. On September 4, Bagration defeated Koca Hüsrev Pasha's army during the Battle of Rassowa, blocking the route to Silistria. During the siege of Silistria, the Russians were also actively engaged in the siege of Izmail, which lasted from August 23 to September 14. On September 8, Bagration began moving towards Silistria. The Silistria garrison itself had an army of 11,000-12,000 men, as well as 130 guns and was well supplied with provisions. The Russians besieged the fortress with 20,000 soldiers.

== Siege ==
The siege began on September 11. The following day, September 12, the fortress was shelling and siege work began. The Turks, wishing to disrupt the work, launched a sortie that was repelled. On September 18, the Turks launched another sortie, attacking the Cossack positions. The Cossacks successfully repelled the sortie, inflicting losses 70 casualties and five captured. On the night of September 18, three Russian ships passed by Silitria and, positioned above her, cut off the fortress's communications with Ruschuk.

On September 20, the Russians received reinforcements in the form of Markov's corps. That same day, Pehvelin set out from Ruschuk, heading for Silistria, along with the tyrant Mahmut, a force of approximately 3,000-4,000 men. Upon learning of this, Platov immediately marched from Kalipetri, crossing the road from Kapakli to meet the Turkish vanguard, taking up position on the plain.

The battle took place on September 24. When the Turkish cavalry appeared on the plain, Platov sent all his Kazakh regiments against them. An attack by regular cavalry and Cossacks routed the Turkish vanguard, beginning a pursuit. Pehvelin, having occupied the height, began preparing for battle, laying heavy rifle fire on the Cossacks. Platov ordered a second cavalry attack, during which Isayev with two Cossack regiments struck the flank, while the dragoons and lancers rushed to the front. The Turks were shattered and pursued back to their camp. During the battle, the Turks lost approximately 1,000 men and 108 captured, including the wounded Mahmut. The Russians lost 60 men killed and many wounded.

That same day, the Turks, unaware of the battle's outcome, left Silistra with 2,000 men to join Pehvelin, but Platov immediately dispatched Cossacks against them, who routed them, inflicting heavy losses.

Following the Turks' unsuccessful attack on September 24, the Grand vizier sent new forces to Silistra, intending to launch a combined attack with the garrison on the Russian troops. Indeed, on that day, a large Turkish detachment marched out of Silistra, attacking the forward Russian forces on the Bazardizh and Girsovka roads. After a six-hour skirmish, the Turks retreated, having lost 400 men. The situation of the besieged became increasingly difficult.

The outcome of the siege depended primarily on whether the Russian army could defeat the Turkish forces sent to relieve the siege. Another setback would have been a heavy blow to the Silistria garrison.

On October 7, the Turkish army began its advance from Ruschuk to Tataritsa, led by serasker Pehvelin Ibrahim Pasha, along with Boşnik Aga and Trekhbunchu Pasha Mehmet. Pehvelin entered Tataritsa without difficulty and dug in there. The Russians received news of this only on October 9.

Before the performance in Tataritsa, Bagration entrusted command to Count Langeron, who had been left behind before Silistra, and appointed two more generals to assist him: Bulatov and Manteuffel. Lieutenant General Markov also remained. The total number of remaining Russian troops was 7,000 soldiers, while the Turks had 12, while the Turks had 12,000 men in the fortress.

== Battle of Tataritsa ==
The entirety of 9 October was spent in preparation for the battle. Bagration planned to attack first, despite the numerical superiority of his enemies. Ottoman general Pehlivan Ibrahim Pasha knew about this, and strengthened the trenches in the village.

=== Square ===
Meeting the unexpected onslaught of the Ottomans, the Russian cavalry turned back in a disorderly withdrawal. At this time, the infantry began to form an infantry square, of which the first attack of the Turks on it failed. There were three large squares in total: Under the commands of Ivan Paskevich, Pavel Palen, and Vasily Trubetskoy.

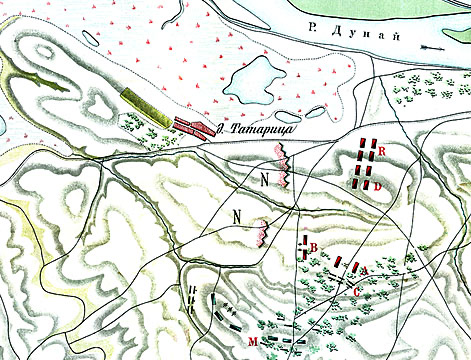
Battle plan near the village of Tataritsa, 22 October [O.S. 10 October] 1809

Retreating cavalry and Cossacks were eliminated from the battle, and the brunt of the attacks shifted to the infantry. Having received reinforcements, the Turks repeated their attacks, this time forcing part of the forces to enter. This resulted in the connection between the three Russian squares to br lost. By the middle of the day, Palen made his way to join Paskevich and asked him to start a retreat, to which he received a playful answer: "True, we can die, but we can fight back!". Part of the Russian dragoons that contacted the infantry decided to dismount, thereby increasing their effectiveness in battle. At the same time, Trubetskoy was able to recover two lost guns. His success was complemented by the fact that reinforcements arrived, and the Russian right flank was finally able to repel the Turkish onslaught. Attempts by the garrison to help the attackers were also unsuccessful.

The participation of the Albanian corps put the Russians in a dangerous position. Paskevich understood that the artillery of the Turks was causing him great damage, and that they would not be able to hold their positions with continuous rifle exchanges. Thus, he decided to go on the offensive. In a mixed order, Paskevich captured the positions of the Albanians and Turks, returning the previously lost cannons. However, he could not consolidate success as the Turkish trenches were too well fortified. Thus, Paskevich decided to return to the redoubts captured earlier.

The Russians repulsed all attacks and prevented the direct lifting of the siege from Silistra, which led to some Russian sources to state that this specific event ended in a Russian victory. Despite this, Bagration was unhappy with the consequences of the battle. The Turkish positions were not eliminated, and another 20,000-strong army under the command of Grand Vizier Kör Yusuf Ziyaüddin Pasha was on its way to relieve Silistra. This aftermath forced Bagration on 14 October to lift the siege of Silistra and begin a retreat to Bucharest.

=== Actions of the Silistra garrison ===
During the battle, the Silistria garrison did not remain idle, but it did not make a significant effort to assist Peglivan. Early in the morning on the day of the battle, 3,000 horsemen emerged from the fortress ramparts and climbed the mountain to the left of Markov, behind the Kalipetri valley. Another cavalry detachment intended to cross the valley running along the Danube, aiming to reach the rear of our army, but this detachment was held back by Lisanevich and the Cossacks, who, on their right flank, had joined forces sent to Markov's left flank. Langereon then dispatched Count Manteuffel with reinforcements, who stopped the Turks, fighting them all morning with great courage and prudence.

== Aftermath ==
After Pyotr Bagration's defeat at Silistria, he was removed from his post as commander of the Danube army and replaced by Nikolai Kamensky. Silistria itself, despite successfully repelling an attempt to capture the fortress, still fell in May 1810 during a new siege.

== Sources ==
- Petrov, Andrei (1887). Описание войны России с Турцией 1806-1812 [Description of the war between Russia and Turkey 1806-1812] (in Russian). Vol. 2. St. Petersburg: Типография Балашева.
- Mikhailovsky-Danilevsky, Alexander (1849). Описание Турецкой войны с 1806 по 1812 (in Russian). Vol. 1–2. Saint-Petersburg: Типография отдельного корпуса стражей.
- Scherbatov, Alexander (1888). Генерал-фельдмаршал Паскевич. Его жизнь и деятельность [Field Marshal Paskevich. His life and work] (in Russian). Vol. 1. St. Petersburg: Типография Голике.
- Langeron, Alexander Fedorovich (1824). Записки графа Ланжерона [Notes of Count Langeron] (in Russian). Vol. Siege of Silistra.
- Tikhonov, Igor Sergeevich (2005). Багратион Петр Иванович [Bagration Pyotr Ivanovich]. Great Russian Encyclopedia (in Russian).
- Velichko, Konstantin; Novitsky, Vasily; Schwartz, Alexey von; Apushkin, Vladimir; Schoultz, Gustav von (1911). "Багратион, Петр Иванович, князь" [Pyotr Ivanovich Bagration, prince]. Sytin Military Encyclopedia (in Russian). Vol. 4: Порох – Бомба. St. Petersburg: Типография Т-ва И. Д. Сытина.
- Vengerov, S.; Voeikov, A.; Kareev, N. (1901). "Татарица" [Tataritsa]. Brockhaus and Efron Encyclopedic Dictionary (in Russian). Vol. 32: Тай – Термиты. St. Petersburg: Типография акц. общ. «Издательское дело, Брокгауз-Ефрон. p. 669.
