= Prince Alexander of Kartli (died 1773) =

Member of the Bagratoni dynasty (died 1773)

Alexander
- Born: c. 1705/08
- Died: September 1773; Kizlyar, Russian Empire
- Issue Among others: Princess Ana; Prince Ioane (Ivane); Prince Kiril
- Dynasty: Bagrationi
- Father: Jesse of Kartli
- Religion: Georgian Orthodox Church (formerly Shia Islam)

Alexander (Georgian: ალექსანდრე, romanized: aleksandre), also known as Ishaq Beg (Georgian: ისაკ-ბეგი, romanized: isak'-begi; c. 1705/08 – September 1773), was an illegitimate son of the Georgian ruler Jesse of Kartli, of the Bagrationi-Mukhraneli, politically active in Georgia in the 1740s. His progeny subsequently flourished in the Russian Empire, producing several notable figures of the 19th century, among them General Pyotr Bagration of the Napoleonic Wars fame.

== Biography ==
Alexander was born in Safavid Iran as a Muslim, and was called Ishaq Beg. From 1743 to 1744, he served as a janisin (regent) of Kartli, then under Iranian sway. He was soon removed from the office by his cousin Teimuraz II, of the rival Bagrationi branch from Kakheti, who became king of Kartli in 1744. Ishaq Beg joined the opposition faction led by his half-brother Abdullah Beg, but soon had to submit to the ascending power of the Kakhetian Bagrationi. In 1750, he converted to Christianity, baptized with the name Alexander and received a fief in Kvemo Kartli. Soon, his relations with Teimuraz again went downhill and Alexander fled to Russia in 1759. He entered the Russian military service and first joined a garrison at Astrakhan and then, in 1761, the Georgian squadron in Kizlyar in the ranks of podpolkovnik.

== Family ==
The children of Alexander were:

- Princess Ana (1723–1780), who married firstly a member of the Golitsyn family and secondly Pyotr Igorovich Dadianov;
- Prince Ioane (Ivane) (1730–1795) (Ivan Aleksandrovich Bagration), second major of the Russian army. He was the father of Pyotr, Roman, and Alexander;
- Prince Solomon (fl. 1750);
- Prince Toma (born 1743);
- Kiril (1749–1828) (Kiril Aleksandrovich Bagration), major general of the Russian army and a senator.
