= Kiril Bagration =

Russian general (1749–1828)

Prince Kiril Bagration (Georgian: კირილე ბაგრატიონი, Kirile Bagrationi; Russian: Кири́лл Алекса́ндрович Багратио́н, Kirill Aleksandrovich Bagration) (1749 – 19 April 1828) was an Imperial Russian general and official of Georgian origin, descended from the royal line of the Bagrationi-Mukhraneli of Kartli. He was a grandson of King Jesse of Kartli and uncle of General Pyotr Bagration of the Napoleonic Wars fame.

== Career ==
Prince Kiril Bagration was a son of Prince Alexander, a natural son of King Jesse of Kartli. Kiril was nine years old, when Alexander fled the unfavorable political climate in Kartli and joined his émigré relatives in Russia in 1759. Kiril and his elder brother, Ivan, following their father's suit, entered the Russian service. Kiril enlisted in the Pskov Carabinier Regiment as a wachtmeister in 1767 and fought in the 1768–74 Russo-Turkish War which he ended as a captain. From 1776 to 1777, he took part in bringing the Crimean Tatars to submission and eventually represented the Crimean nobility at the court of the tsarina Catherine II. Promoted to lieutenant-colonel in 1786, he was present at the siege and capture of Bender during the 1787–92 Russo-Turkish War and commanded a vanguard in General Wilhelm Derfelden's corps during the 1792 invasion of Poland. Bagration became a colonel in 1793 and enlisted in the Chuguyevsky Cossack Regular Regiment, which he accompanied in the Persian Expedition of 1796. He was promoted to major-general in 1797 and put in command of a jäger regiment, which was given his name in 1798.

In 1800, Prince Bagration resigned from military due to deteriorating health and was transferred to civil service as a pivy councilor. In this capacity, he attended the Moscow department of the Governing Senate and then was tasked with inspecting the Belarus Governorate. In 1805 he was moved to the 7th Department of the Senate and remained its member until his death in Moscow at the age of 78 on 19 April 1828. He was buried at the necropolis of the Georgian nobility at the Donskoy Monastery.

== Family ==
Prince Bagration was married twice, first with Varvara Alekseyevna Khovanskaya (1769–1788), of Gediminid stock, and then Aleksandra Ivanovna Golikova (1778–1853), daughter of a co-owner of the Russian-American Company. He had six children:

- Prince Aleksandr (1785–1837), born of Kiril's first marriage. He was a jäger officer and a participant of the 1812 war with Napoleonic France. Kiril's progeny became extinct in male line with the death of Aleksandr's grandsons Dmitry and Aleksandr Bagration in 1919 and 1920, respectively.
- Prince Aleksey (1787–1824), born of Kiril's first marriage. Like his elder brother, he was a jäger officer in the 1812 war. He was married with Ζoë Mavrocordato-Văcărescu, with six children, among them:
  - Constantine Alekseevich Bagration.
- Princess Natalya (1803–1873), born of Kiril's second marriage. She was married to a natural son of the Livonian Baron Albedyll. Her son, Pyotr Albedinsky (1826–1883), had a successful career as a general and statesman in the Russian service.
- Princess Anna (1804–1875), born of Kiril's second marriage, lady-in-waiting of the Imperial Court of Russia. She was married to General Nikolay Godeyn (1790–1856).
- Princess Darya (1809–1831), born of Kiril's second marriage.
- Prince Pyotr (born 1811), born of Kiril's second marriage, he died in infancy.
