= Alexander Bagration =

Alexander Bagration may refer to:

- Alexander Bagration of Mukhrani (1853–1918), Georgian nobleman
- Alexander Ivanovich Bagration (1771–1820), Georgian royal prince
