= Siege of Silistria =

Siege of Silistria or Silistra may refer to:

- Siege of Silistra (1773), during the Russo-Turkish War of 1768–1774
- Siege of Silistra (1809), during the Russo-Turkish War of 1806–1812
- Siege of Silistra (1828), during the Russo-Turkish War of 1828–1829
- Siege of Silistra (1829), during the Russo-Turkish War of 1828–1829
- Siege of Silistria (1854), during the Crimean War

== See also ==
- Battle of Silistra (968)
- Battle of Dorostolon (disambiguation)
