= Ivane Bagrationi =

Georgian prince and army officer (1730–1795)

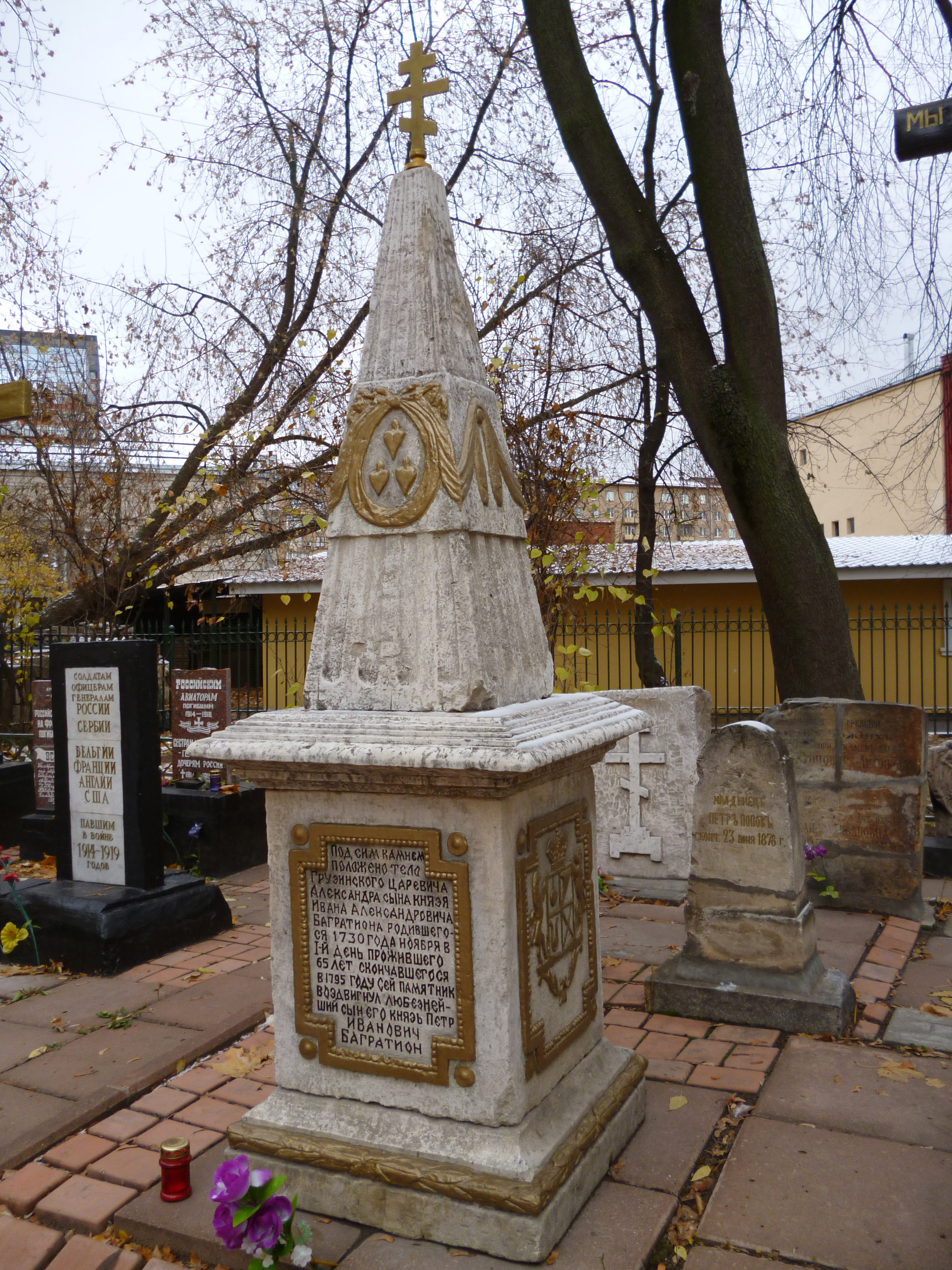
Tomb of Prince Ivane.

Ivane Bagrationi (Georgian: ივანე ბაგრატიონი, 1730–1795), was a Georgian royal prince (batonishvili) of the Bagrationi dynasty from the House of Mukhrani. Ivane was a second major of the Russian army although he did not know the Russian language and retired very early. He served at Kizlyar fortress.

== Early life ==
He was born in Iran and was the son of Prince Alexander of Kartli. His father moved to Russia in 1757 and was promoted to lieutenant colonel of the Russian imperial army. His brother Kirill was a major-general of the Russian army and a member of the Governing Senate.

== Tombstone ==
The tombstone of Prince Ivane is located at Vsesvyatskoye Church (Храм Всех Святых во Всехсвятском) in Moscow. The monument was placed on his grave personally by his son General and Prince Pyotr Bagration. The monument is a fluted pyramid on a high pedestal. The Tombstone of Prince Ivane has changed position repeatedly. Now it is set in the north of the temple near the memorial of "Reconciliation of Peoples." Tombstone of Ivane Bagration refers to the history of the monuments and is of federal significance.

== Family ==
Prince Ivan married a woman from Georgian nobility and had three sons:

- Pyotr Bagration (1765–1812), General in the Russian Army
- Alexander Bagration (1771–1820)
- Roman Bagration (1778–1834), General in the Russian Army
