= Battle of Dorostolon =

Battle of Dorostolon may refer to:

- Battle of Silistra (968), also called Dorostolon
- Siege of Dorostolon (971)
- Battle of Dristra (1087), also called Dorostolon

== See also ==
- Siege of Silistria (disambiguation)
