= Sima, Vladimir Oblast =

Sima Сима
- Selo
- Location within Vladimir Oblast Location within Russia
- Coordinates: 56°41′N 39°33′E
- Country: Russia
- Region: Vladimir Oblast
- District: Yuryev-Polsky District
- Time zone: UTC+3:00

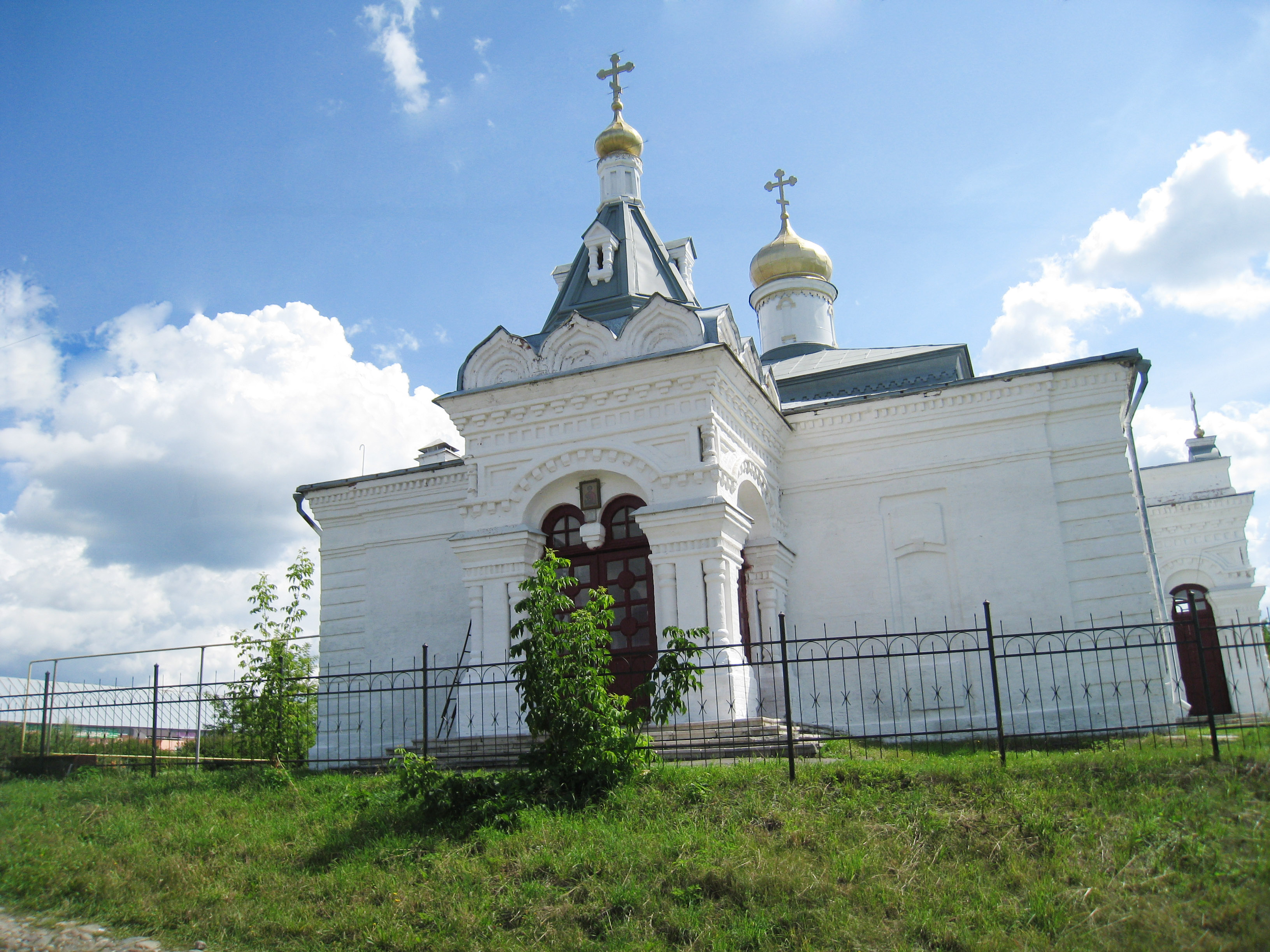
Church of St. Demetrius of Thessaloniki, Sima, Yuryev-Polsky District, Vladimir oblast

Sima (Russian: Сима) is a rural locality (a selo) and the administrative center of Simskoye Rural Settlement, Yuryev-Polsky District, Vladimir Oblast, Russia. The population was 1,537 as of 2010. There are 17 streets.

== Geography ==
Sima is located on the Simka River, 24 km north of Yuryev-Polsky (the district's administrative centre) by road. Bildino is the nearest rural locality.
