= Battle of Rassowa =

Part of the Russo-Turkish War (1806–1812)

- Part of the Russo-Turkish War (1806–1812)
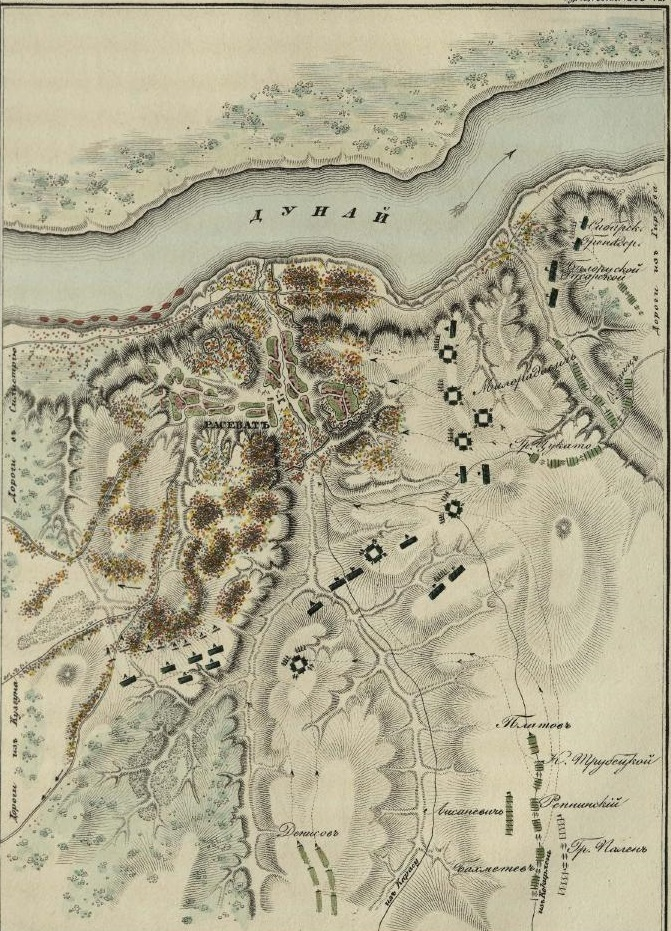
- Battleplan
Date	16 September (Note: Old Style: 4 September) 1809
Location	Rassowa, or Rassevat, Bulgaria
Result	Russian victory

Belligerents
Russian Empire	Ottoman Empire

Commanders and leaders
(Russian Empire) Pyotr Bagration (Russian Empire) Mikhail Miloradovich	(Ottoman Empire) Koca Hüsrev Mehmed Pasha

Strength
18,000; 45 guns	12,000

Casualties and losses
200 (mainly Cossacks)	4,000 killed 1,000 captured 30 banners 7 guns

The Battle of Rassowa/Rassevat was fought during the Russo-Turkish War of 1806–1812 on September 16, 1809. (Note: Old Style: 4 September) In it, Pyotr Bagration's Russian troops defeated the Turkish troops of Koca Hüsrev Mehmed Pasha at the place of Rassowa.

In Cernavodă, where Bagration arrived on September 14, (Note: Old Style: 2 September) reconnaissance was carried out. Acting according to Bagration's plan, Mikhail Miloradovich's corps launched a frontal attack, while Matvei Platov's corps cut off Hüsrev Pasha's escape route to Silistria. The Russian victory was complete.
