= Pyotr Bagration =

Georgian general, born and served in Russia (1765–1812)

General Prince Pyotr Ivanovich Bagration
- პეტრე ბაგრატიონი
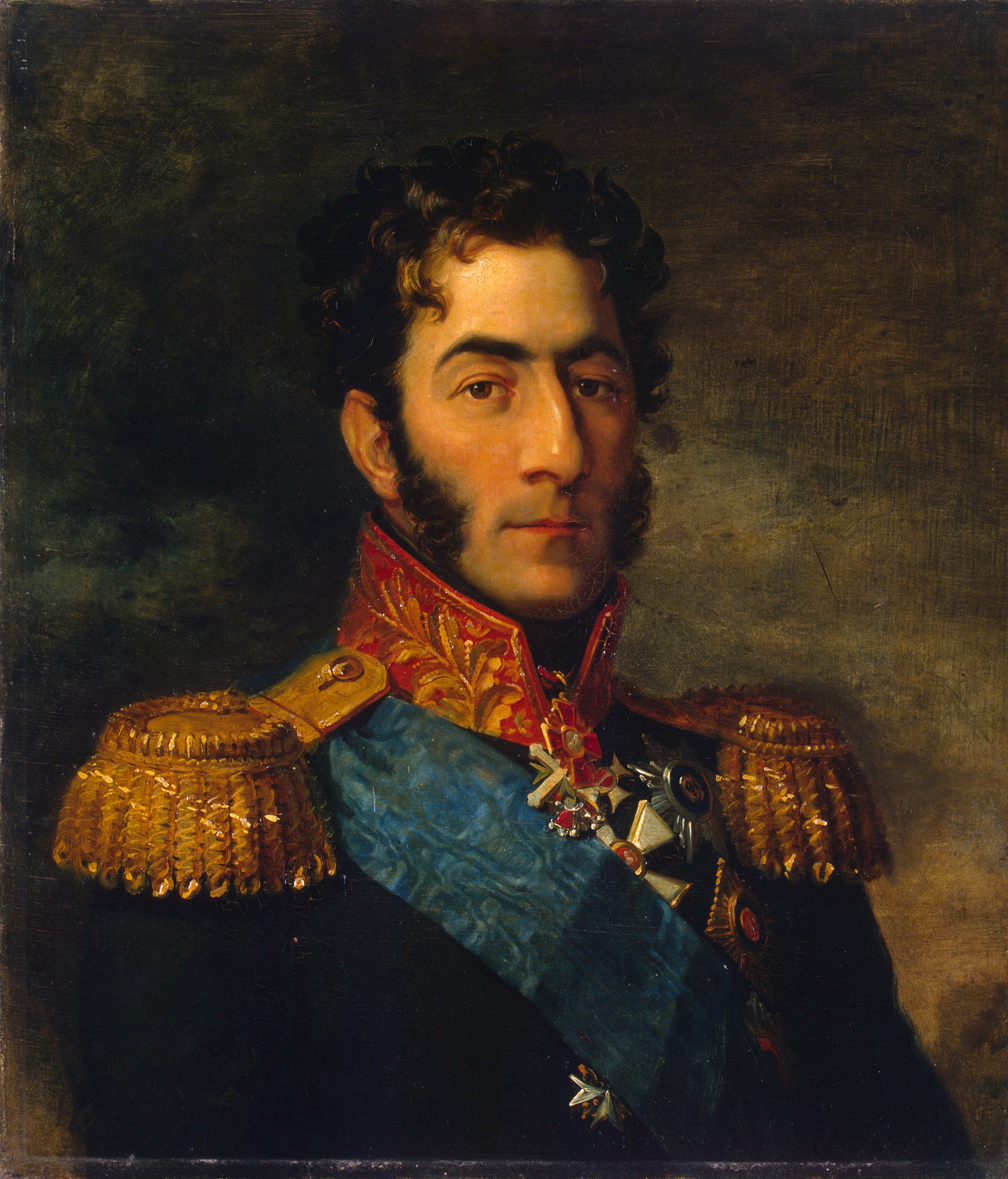
- Portrait by George Dawe, 1819–1825
- Born: 10 July [O.S. 29 June] 1765; Kizlyar, Astrakhan Governorate, Russian Empire
- Died: 24 September [O.S. 12 September] 1812 (aged 47); Sima, Vladimir Governorate, Russian Empire
- Burial place: Borodino Battlefield, Russia
- Spouse: Catherine Bagration née Skavronskaya
- Relatives: Ivane (father); Roman and Alexander (brothers); Pyotr (nephew)
- Military career
- Allegiance: Russia
- Branch: Imperial Russian Army
- Service years: 1782–1812
- Rank: General of the Infantry
- Nicknames: "God of the Army" "The Eagle"
- Commands: See list: • Suvorov's vanguard during his Italian campaign; • Suvorov's vanguard during his Swiss campaign; • 6th Jaegers; • 22nd Infantry Division; • Jaegers of the Imperial Guard (Lifeguard Jaeger Regiment); • Russian rearguard at Hollabrunn; • Coalition right wing at Austerlitz; • Russian rearguard at Eylau; • Russian Army during Russo-Turkish War; • Army of Moldavia; • Second Western Army; • Left wing of the Russian forces at Borodino
- Conflicts: See list: Russian-Circassian War; Battle of Aldy; Russo-Turkish War (1787–1792); Siege of Ochakov; Kościuszko Uprising; Storming of Praga; Italian campaign; Capture of Brescia; Capture of Bergamo; Battle of the Adda River; Combat of Lecco (WIA); First Battle of Marengo; Battle of the Trebbia (WIA); Battle of Novi; Swiss campaign; Battle of Klöntal (WIA); Battle of Glarus; Combats of Schwanden; Finnish War; Battle of Lokalaks; Helsinki village landing; Russo-Turkish War (1806–1812); Battle of Rassowa; Battle of Tataritsa; Siege of Silistria; Napoleonic Wars; Battle of Amstetten; Battle of Schöngrabern; Battle of Wischau; Battle of Austerlitz; Battle of Eylau; Battle of Heilsberg; Battle of Friedland; Battle of Saltanovka; First Battle of Krasnoi; Battle of Smolensk; Battle of Shevardino; Battle of Borodino (DOW)
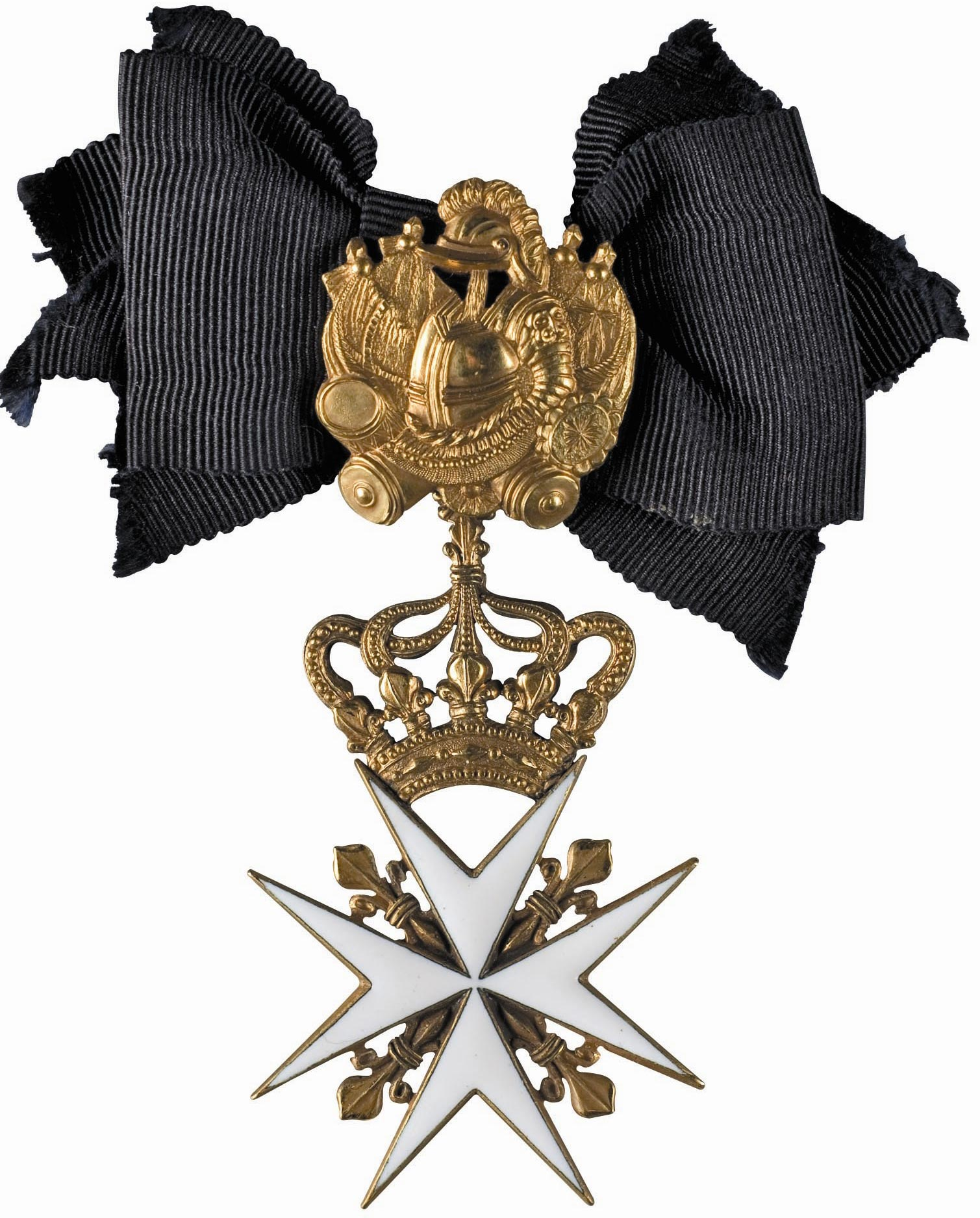
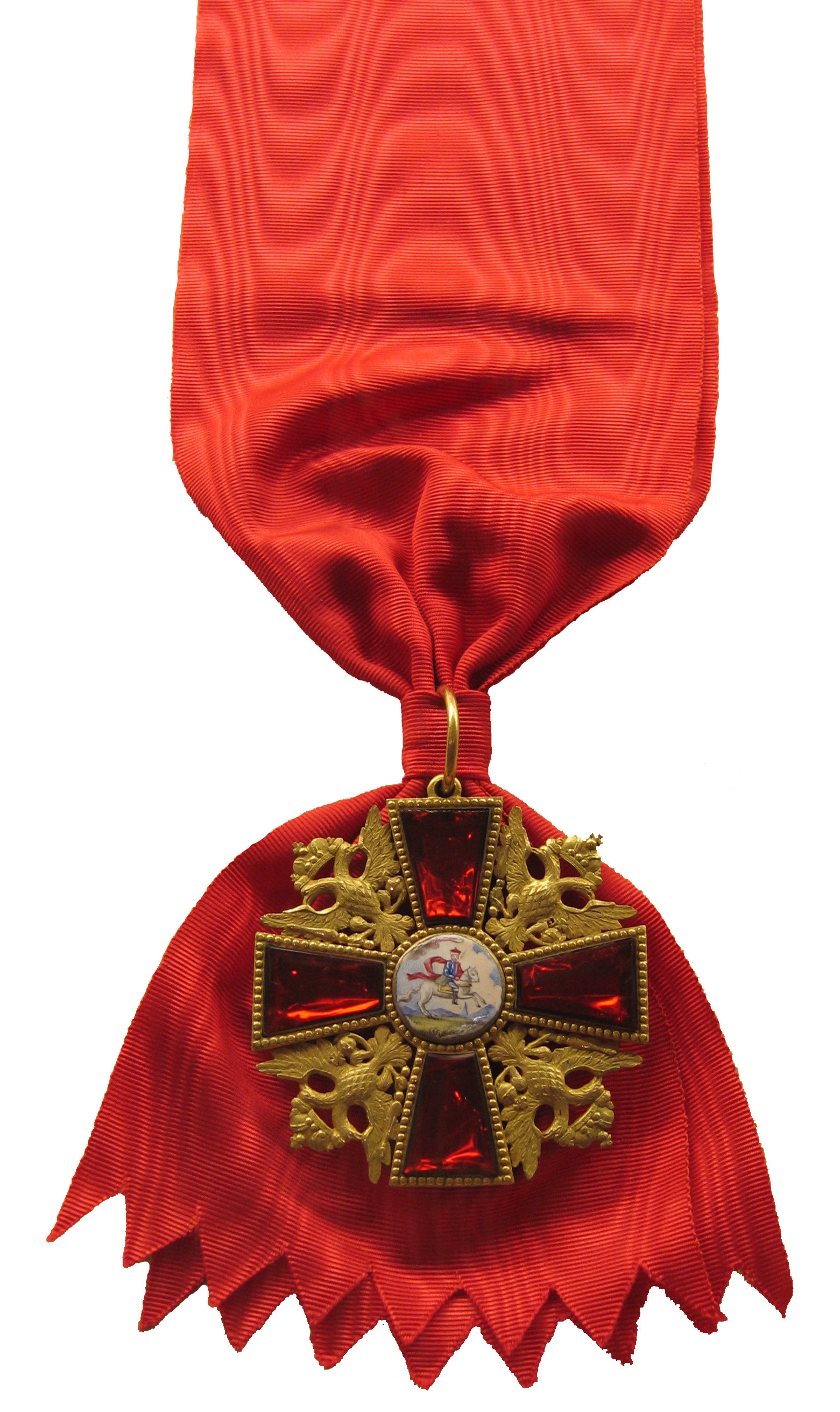
- Awards: Weapons: Gold Sword for Bravery

Prince Pyotr Ivanovich Bagration (Note: The Russian form of his name, Pyotr, Pjotr or Pëtr Ivanovich Bagration (Пётр Иванович Багратион), includes a patronym based on his father's name Ivane. "Pyotr" is also anglicized as Peter. The Russian surname is pronounced [bəɡrɐtʲɪˈon]. His title "prince" translates the Russian title knyaz. In English, it is also alternatively pronounced /bəˈɡreɪʃən/ bə-GRAY-shən or /bəˌɡrɑːtsiˈoʊn/ bə-GRAHT-see-OHN. His name in Georgian was Petre Bagrationi (პეტრე ბაგრატიონი), pronounced [baɡɾatʼioni] with no significant stress. His title "prince" translates as the Georgian title batonishvili.) (10 July 1765 – 24 September 1812) was a Russian general and prince of Georgian origin, prominent during the French Revolutionary and Napoleonic Wars.

Bagration, a member of the Bagrationi dynasty, was born in Kizlyar. His father, Ivan (Ivane), served as an officer in the Imperial Russian Army, in which Bagration also enlisted in 1782. Pyotr Ivanovich Bagration began his military career serving in the Russo-Circassian War of 1763–1864. He later participated in a war against the Ottomans and the capture of Ochakov in 1788. Later, he helped suppress the Kościuszko Uprising of 1794 in Poland and capture Warsaw. During Russia's Italian and Swiss campaigns of 1799 against the French, he served with distinction under Field Marshal Alexander Suvorov.

In 1805, Russia joined the coalition against Napoleon. After the collapse of the Austrians at Ulm in October 1805, Bagration won praise for his successful defense in the Battle of Schöngrabern (November 1805) that allowed Russian forces to withdraw and unite with the main Russian army of Mikhail Kutuzov. In December 1805, the combined Russo-Austrian army suffered defeat at the Battle of Austerlitz, where Bagration commanded the allied right wing against the French under Jean Lannes. He commanded Russian troops in the Finnish War (1808–1809) against Sweden and in another war against the Turks (1806–1812) on the Danube.

During the French invasion of Russia in 1812, Bagration commanded one of two large Russian armies (Barclay de Tolly commanded the other) fighting a series of rear-guard actions. The Russians failed to stop the French advance at the Battle of Smolensk in August 1812. Barclay had proposed a scorched-earth retreat that the emperor Alexander I of Russia had approved, although Bagration preferred to confront the French in a major battle. Kutuzov succeeded Barclay as commander-in-chief but continued his policy until the Battle of Borodino (7 September [O.S. 26 August] 1812) near Moscow. Bagration commanded the left wing around what became known as the Bagration flèches at Borodino, where he was mortally wounded; he died two weeks later. Originally buried at a local church, in 1839 he was reburied on the battlefield of Borodino.

== Life ==
Bagration was born in 1765 to a prince of the Mukhrani branch of the Bagrationi dynasty, Colonel Prince Ivane Bagrationi, who was the eldest son of Prince Alexander, an illegitimate son of King Jesse of Kartli, which is now central Georgia. He studied Russian and German and was taught Persian, Turkish, Armenian, and Georgian by his father. However, unlike many other Russian aristocrats, he did not know French.

Pyotr joined the Imperial Russian Army in 1782, enlisting as a sergeant in the Kavsansk Rifles of the Astrakhan Infantry Regiment. His younger brother Roman joined the Chuguev Cossack regiment as a uryadnik (a Cossack NCO) at the age of thirteen in 1791. Both would go on to become generals of the Imperial Russian Army.

Bagration served for some years in the Russo–Circassian War. He participated in the Siege of Ochakov (1788). In 1792, he was commissioned as a captain and transferred to the Kiev Cavalry Regiment that year as a second Major, transferring as a full first Major to the Sofiiskii Carabineers on 15 May 1794. He served in the military campaign to suppress the Polish Kościuszko Uprising of 1794.

He received successive promotions to lieutenant-colonel (26 October 1794), to colonel (1798) and to major-general (1799). His merits were recognized by Suvorov, whom he accompanied in the Italian and Swiss campaigns of 1799, capturing the towns of Brescia and Bergamo (21 and 24 Apr) and having fought along the Adda River (on 26 Apr), near the Trebbia River (on 17–19 Jun), at the town of Novi (15 Aug), at the Gotthard Pass (24 Sep), in the Klön Valley (30 Sep to 1 Oct), near Glarus (1 Oct) and at Schwanden (5 Oct). From 1798 to 1799, he commanded the 6th Jaegers; from 1801 to 1802, he commanded the Jaegers of the Imperial Guard; then from 1802 to 1805, he served as GOC Jaeger Brigade.

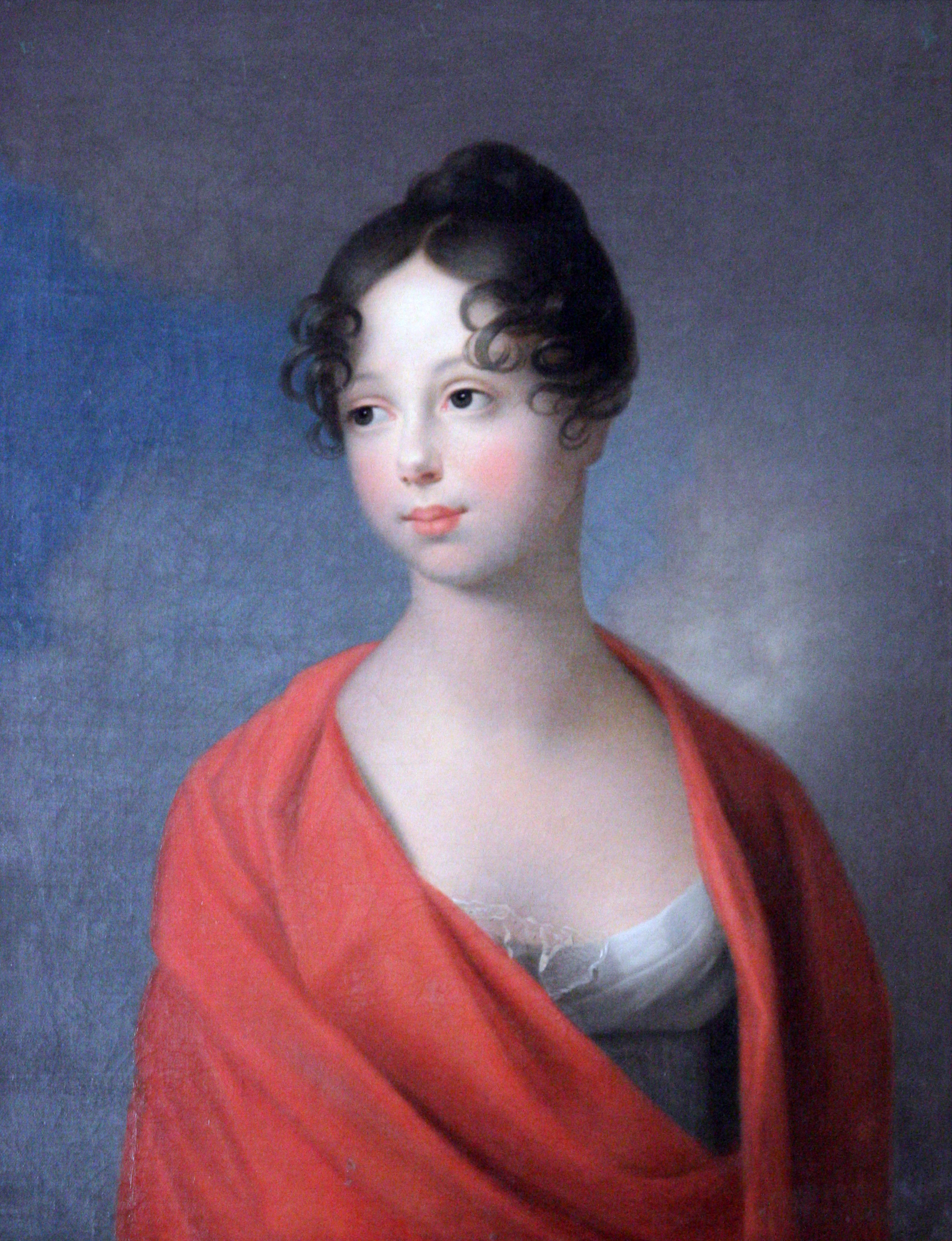
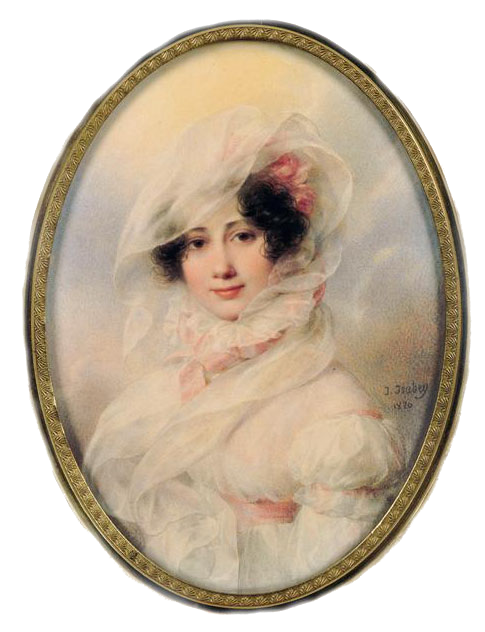
Catherine Pavlovna of Russia (left), a daughter of Emperor Paul I of Russia, was passionately in love with Prince Bagration. That worried the Russian royal family, and to avoid future relations between the two, the emperor Paul forced Bagration to marry Princess Catherine Skavronskaya (right) in 1800.

He was the alleged lover of Emperor Paul's daughter Catherine. In 1800 Paul recognized the title of "Prince (Knyaz) Bagration" for Pyotr in Russia, and unexpectedly married him off to Countess Catherine Pavlovna Skavronskaya, the favourite niece of Grigory Potemkin and one of the Empress Maria's ladies-in-waiting. Bagration and Catherine had been casually involved, but the marriage was a failure. The young and lovely Catherine soon preferred travelling and, in 1805, fled to Vienna, where her salon and running affair with Prince Clemens von Metternich—who called her "the Naked Angel"—permitted her to serve as an important agent of Russian intelligence and diplomacy. Bagration was obliged by the emperor to claim their daughter, Marie-Clementine, as his own and to subsidize thousands of rubles of Catherine's debts. He had a reputation as a heavy gambler, as well, and was forced to sell estates to cover losses that rose as high as 80,000 roubles.

In the wars of 1805, Bagration's achievements appeared even more brilliant. When Napoleon ordered Murat to break an armistice he had just signed with Bagration, the general was able to successfully resist the repeated attacks of forces five times his own numbers under Murat and Lannes at Schöngrabern (16 November) near Hollabrunn. Though Bagration lost half of the men under his command, their stand protected the retreat of the main army under Kutuzov to Olmütz. When Kutuzov was overruled and forced into battle at Austerlitz (2 December), Bagration commanded the advance guard of the Prince Liechtenstein's column and defended the allied right against Lannes while the left attacked Napoleon's deliberately undefended right flank. He was promoted to lieutenant-general in 1805, and in 1807 fought bravely and obstinately at the battles of Eylau (7 February), Heilsberg (11 June), and Friedland (14 June).

He was successful as commander of both Russia's Finnish Campaign in 1808 and Turkish Campaign in 1809. In the former, he captured the Åland Islands by a daring march across the frozen Gulf of Finland. His rapid transfer to the distant Moldavian front against the Ottoman Empire has been seen as a reprimand for an alleged affair with the tsarevna Catherine, who was married off shortly thereafter. While there, he led the Russian army at Rassowa and Tataritza and was promoted to full general of infantry.

In 1812, Bagration commanded the Second Western Army. A few days before Napoleon's invasion on 24 June, he suggested to Alexander I a pre-emptive strike into the Duchy of Warsaw. Defeated at Mogilev (23 July), Bagration led his forces to join the 1st Army at Smolensk under Barclay de Tolly, to whom he ceded overall command of both armies on 2 August. Bagration led the left wing at the Battle of Borodino (7 September) where he constructed many flèches which, due to a shortage of engineer officers, were poorly built. During the battle, he received a mortal wound and later died from gangrene on 24 September, in the village of Simi, where his aunt resided.

It is said that, while wounded, Bagration kept giving orders to the troops without knowing that the Russian army was abandoning Moscow. When he finally heard the truth, Bagration was so shocked that he rapidly stood up, totally forgetting about his grave wound. Such an act was too much for his severely wounded body, and it quickly cost Bagration his life.

== Napoleonic Wars ==
=== Battles of Hollabrunn and Austerlitz ===
In the course of the War of the Third Coalition, Napoleon's defeat of General Mack's Austrian army at Ulm on 19 October 1805 led Kutuzov to consider withdrawing and uniting his forces with reinforcements arriving at Brünn. Kutuzov ordered Bagration to guard Vienna with just a single regiment to stall a possible French assault. The French marshals Murat and Lannes made a false armistice claim to position themselves near the Danube at Vienna. When the guards were distracted, they rushed over the bridge to secure the town. Kutuzov was in a hurry to unite his army with the Russian troops commanded by Buxhoeveden, so he needed a diversion to delay the French advance. Bagration then took command of the Russian army's rearguard to do so. His combined Russo-Austrian force numbered less than 7,500 men facing a foe more than five times the size. Bagration took up a position 6 km north of Hollabrunn, on the hill north above the small town of Schöngrabern, and formed a huge line to trick the French into believing the entire Russian army stood before them. In fact, Marshal Murat hesitated to attack and later even agreed to an offer from Bagration to negotiate an armistice, halting the entire French advance without informing Napoleon. This delay gave Kutuzov enough time to save his army. When word reached Napoleon, he was enraged at Murat's obstinate behaviour and ordered him to resume the attack immediately, ending the armistice on 16 November. The vanguard of Lannes's and Murat's 45,000 men attacked Bagration's position repeatedly but were repelled each time, unable to take the hill for some six hours. General Bagration personally led some of the counter-attacks, which drove the French back. Even though his force suffered heavy casualties and destruction seemed inevitable, Bagration managed to manoeuver his remaining troops out of the area and unite with the rest of the Coalition army at Brunn on 18 November 1805. His actions prevented the Russian army from being cut off and destroyed.

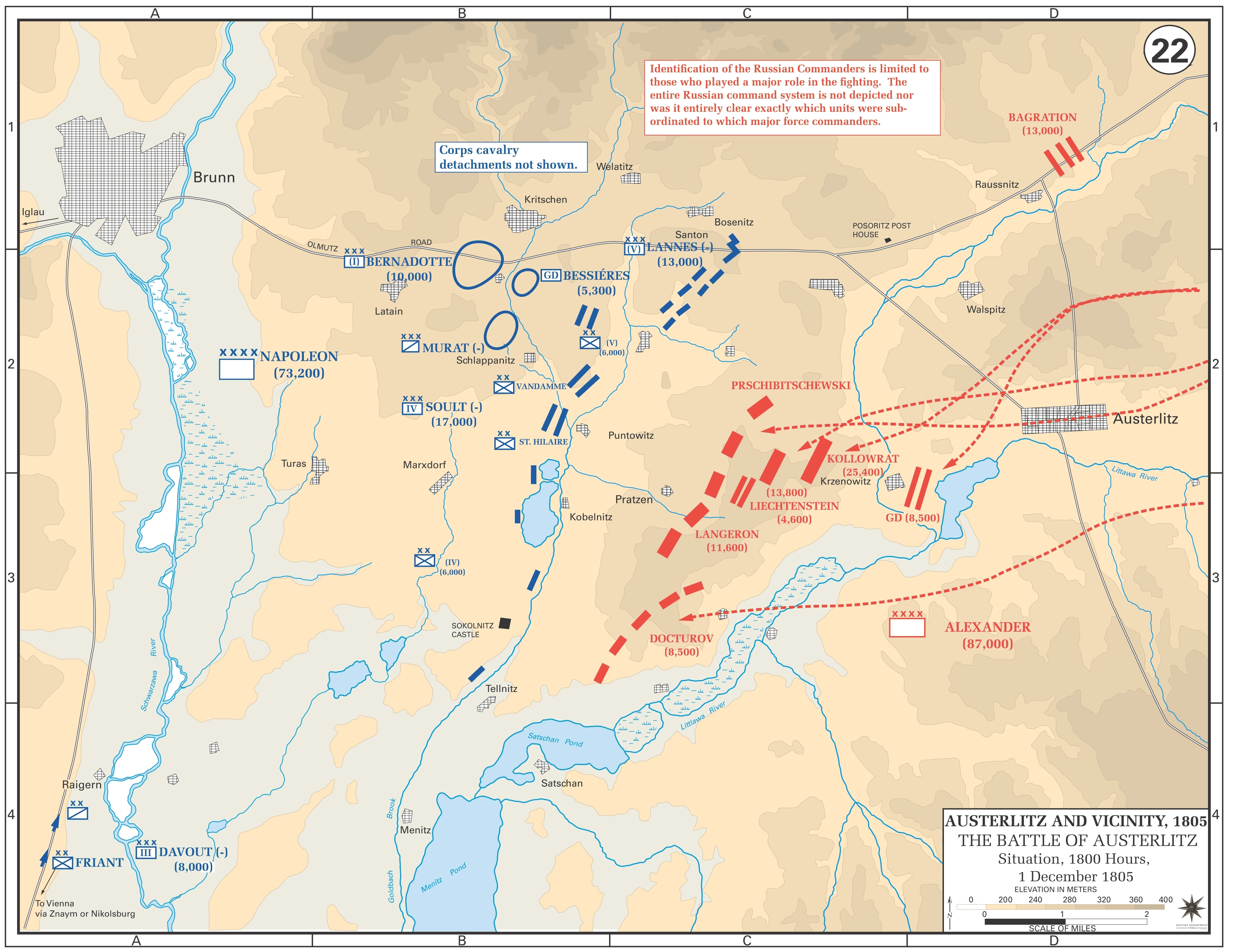
Initial deployments at Austerlitz

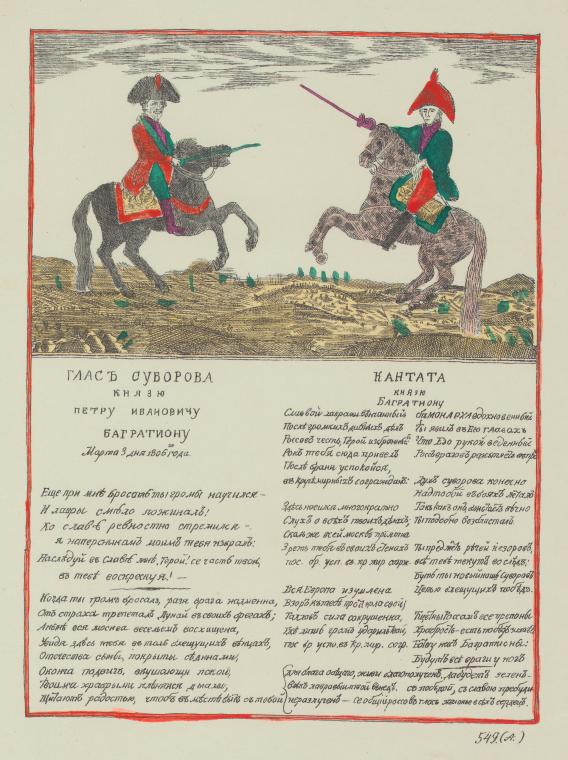
A lubok depicting Bagration and Alexander Suvorov

Just two weeks later, on 2 December 1805, the opposing armies would meet at Austerlitz. This time Bagration assumed command over the Coalition army's 13,000-man-strong right wing, opposing Lannes' equally strong French left wing. When the coalition army started to rout, Bagration too ordered his men to retreat after not achieving any progress against Marshal Lannes, who had the support of elements of Marshal Murat's forces, even though his men fought bravely and fiercely. The battle was lost at that point. While Bagration saw no other option but to commence a strategic withdrawal, Marshal Murat refused Lannes' suggestion to pursue him further so that his corps wouldn't suffer further losses.

=== Battle of Eylau ===
General Bagration demonstrated his skills as a military commander, particularly during the brutal Battle of Eylau, which took place in East Prussia on 7 and 8 February 1807 during the War of the Fourth Coalition. After destroying the Prussian army at Jena-Auerstedt (October 1806), Napoleon was pursuing Russian forces under Marshal Kamensky. In a series of inconclusive clashes, the French did not reach their ultimate goal of destroying the enemy, while the Russians successfully continued retreating. However, on 7 January 1807, General Levin August, Count von Bennigsen assumed overall command of the Russian forces and carried out a successful surprise attack on the French left-wing against Marshal Ney and further against Marshal Bernadotte. Bernadotte managed to evade destruction by winning the Battle of Mohrungen (25 January 1807) and by retreating. Napoleon saw an opportunity to envelop Bennigsen's unprotected left wing by instructing Bernadotte to keep retreating and allowing his army to cut off the Russians from their own retreat. By a stroke of luck, a group of Cossacks intercepted a French messenger carrying Napoleon's orders to Bernadotte and quickly reported to General Bagration. Bagration then informed Bennigsen, who immediately halted his offensive and retreated. The French pursued, and after several engagements, finally confronted the entire Russian army at Eylau on 7 February 1807. Bagration occupied high ground a mile in front of the town, facing Marshal Soult's IV Corps and Marshal Murat's cavalry. The combined French forces assaulted the plateau, but Bagration's heavily outnumbered troops repulsed them. The general demanded bitter resistance from his men to gain time for Bennigsen's heavy artillery to pass through Eylau and join the main Russian force. During the afternoon, the French were reinforced by Marshal Augereau's corps and the Imperial Guard, making up about 45,000 soldiers in all. Under pressure from greatly superior numbers, Bagration finally conducted an orderly retreat to join the main Russian army. Russian forces under General Barclay de Tolly covered the retreat. Despite a clear numerical advantage, the French were not able to achieve a greater victory than eventually driving Bagration's small force off the plateau. Bagration's delaying action and skilful withdrawal enabled the Russian army to escape destruction and consolidate for a decisive battle.

In 1946, Soviet authorities renamed the town of Preußisch Eylau Bagrationovsk in honour of Pyotr Bagration and of his remarkable skills as a tactician.

== Finnish War ==
=== Initial assault ===
Outbreak of the Finnish War in February 1808

During the Finnish War from 1808 to 1809, Bagration commanded the 21st division of the Russian forces under Buxhoeveden. Not wanting to wait until Sweden had concentrated a large army in Finland, the Russian Empire took initiative and decided to take action. On the night of 9 (N.S. 21) September 1808, Russian troops crossed the border to Finland and launched an offensive. Bagration's 21st division was forming the Russian centre and moving ahead to quickly seize Hämeenlinna, Tampere and Pori. Under the pressure of the swift advance, the Swedish forces began a hasty retreat to the depths of Finland and were pursued relentlessly. Bagration's men had to endure the worst weather conditions, severe frost, snowstorms and forest debris. Also, the retreating Swedes were constructing obstacles and destroyed any possible food source as well as roads. Nevertheless, Bagration's division overcame those obstacles and took all objectives, Hämeenlinna on 22 February (6 March), Tampere on 1 March (13) and Pori on 6 (18) March 1808. Bagration managed to advance over a distance of 200 km and capture three cities in just eight days and securing the way to the Gulf of Bothnia. His manoeuvre split the Swedish forces in two, a northern and southern group, providing the Russians with the possibility to strike each group one after another. Bagration correctly assessed the situation that the main Swedish force was in the north and intended to turn his division for an attack. But the commander in chief Buxhoveden foiled that plan by miscalculating the situation and assaulting the southern Swedish group, which had itself fortified in numerous fortifications, with his superior force, including the 21st division of Bagration. This allowed the main Swedish force to retreat unharmed to Oulu. Despite that Bagration himself still achieved success by capturing the strategically important Turku province. In September 1808, Bagration became ill and was forced to leave the theatre of operation. He was keenly interested in the events and hastily returned as soon as he became fit for service again. Upon arrival, he was appointed commander of the Russian forces defending the west coast of Finland.

=== Swedish assault on Turku ===
In September 1808, the Swedish command decided to land troops on Turku to distract attention from the northern Russian Front that threatened the Swedish main army and to secure the southern part of the west coast of Finland. A 2,500 men strong advance guard arrived in Åland and from there departed for the Turku coast. Bagration made a timely response and quickly threw the Swedes back to the sea. The Swedish leadership decided to take Turku at all cost to be able to create a bridgehead for reinforcements. King Gustav IV arrived at the Åland Islands to personally supervise the operation. On 14 (26) September a Swedish vanguard of 5,000 men was landing on Turku. Bagration was carefully monitoring the enemy's activities and allowed the Swedish troops to set foot on shore before he commenced a full assault which destroyed the entire enemy force, leaving only a few who could escape with boats. By the end of 1808, suffering heavy casualties, the Swedish troops were in full retreat and the area of Finland completely cleared of them. Despite those setbacks, the Kingdom of Sweden was not ready to give up the fight.

=== Battle for the Åland Islands ===
In 1809, the Russian command had decided to take the war to the territory of Sweden to finally crush her army. The Russian army was divided into three operational groups commanded by Bagration, Barclay de Tolly and Pavel Shuvalov. Bagration's 17,000-strong corps consisted of 30 infantry battalions, four cavalry squadrons, 600 Cossacks and 20 guns.

The main assault was to be carried out by a daring march across the frozen Gulf of Bothnia from Turku, reaching and capturing the heavily fortified Åland, which were garrisoned by about 10,000 Swedish troops, before continuing on the frozen Sea towards Stockholm. Bagration carefully planned his campaign and managed to supply his troops with fresh food, warm clothes, ammunition and weapons.

The expedition was ready on 26 February (10 March) 1809 and began the next day. The offensive against the Åland was carried out in five attack columns: four engaged in a frontal assault while the fifth bypassed Åland from the south. The Swedish troops did not put up much resistance, preferring to retreat to the major Åland island, from where they intended to stop Bagration's advance. To do so, the Swedish commander-general Carl von Döbeln proposed negotiations for an armistice. Bagration refused, convinced that the sole purpose of von Döbeln's offer was to delay his movements. After completing negotiations, he ordered his troops to advance at an even faster pace. Fearing an encirclement, General von Döbeln abandoned Åland. Pursued by Bagration's troops, the retreat quickly turned into a devastating rout, leaving ammunition, weapons and equipment behind.

To intimidate the Swedes, Bagration ordered a 400-man cavalry detachment under Major General Yakov Kulnev to pursue the Swedes to their own shores. Kulnev managed to take the Swedish town of Grisslehamn, which was just 70 km away from Stockholm. This unexpected turn of events brought shock and confusion to the Swedish leadership and population, who were surprised to hear of Russian troops on Swedish soil. Stockholm was fortified and an army quickly put together and sent to intercept an enemy that was not actually there. The plan worked beyond Bagration's expectations as the psychological impact of Kulnev's incursion into Sweden was decisive for the course of the entire war. Simultaneously the other Russian corps also reached their goals so that the Swedish side found itself forced into peace talks after losing all its claims in Finland. Bagration was highly praised for his conduct of the campaign and was promoted to full general of infantry.

== French invasion of Russia ==
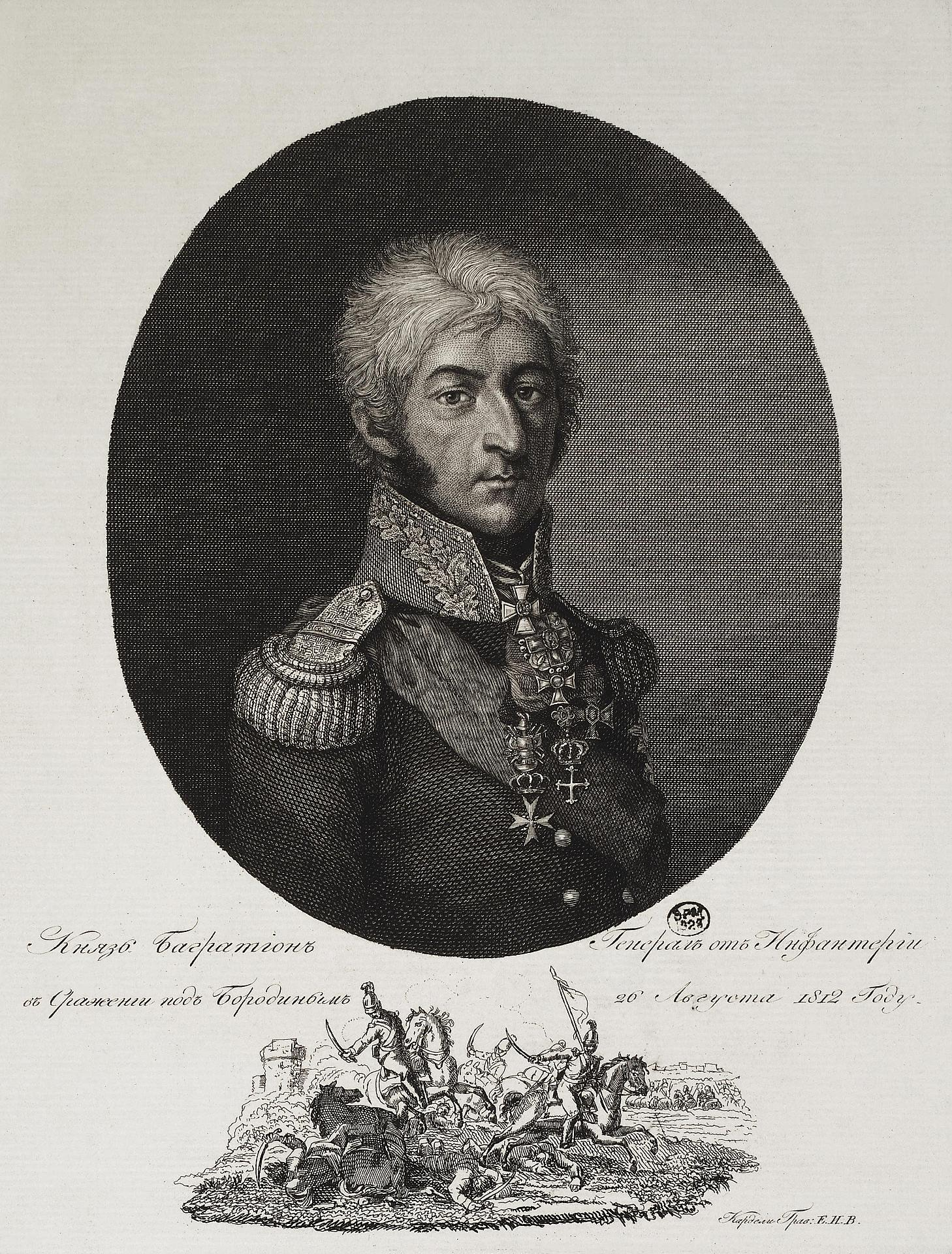
Bagration by Salvatore Cardelli

During the early stage of Napoleon's incursion into Russia, Bagration commanded the 2nd Russian Army deployed close to Vileyka, Belarus. The French march on Vilnius intended to split Bagration's forces from Barclay de Tolly's, who assumed overall command. Napoleon would then destroy Bagration's 2nd army with a combined hammer and anvil operation conducted by King Jerome Bonaparte, Marshal Davout and Prince Eugene after he falsely assumed they ran into Bagration's army when it were only elements of General Dmitry Dokhturov's cavalry. Confusion, false assumptions and lack of information prevented the French from having a clear picture of the situation. On the other side it was not much better. Conflicting orders and lack of information had almost placed Bagration in a blind march straight into Davout's forces. Mud tracks, supply problems, weather and command dispute among the French gave Bagration enough time to join with Dokhturov and assume command over a 45,000 men strong force. Having already lost a large portion of his troops to skirmishes, bad weather condition and diseases, Marshal Davout was reluctant to fight Bagration without Jerome first reinforcing him. The French cavalry was defeated twice by General Platov so that they were kept in the dark. Bagration wasn't better informed with both sides overestimating the other's strength. Davout thought Bagration had some 60,000 men and Bagration thought Davout had 70,000. Bagration was getting orders from both Alexander's staff and Barclay (which Barclay didn't know) and left Bagration without a clear picture of what was expected of him and the general situation. This stream of confused orders to Bagration had him upset with Barclay which would have repercussions later. Even though Barclay de Tolly was given overall command as minister of war, Bagration was not subordinate under him since he was the older general. This is a reason why he constantly received orders from Tsar Alexander and Barclay at the same time.

Despite massive losses among the French, their rapid advance by force march towards Moscow repeatedly prevented de Tolly from establishing a defensive position and was forced to retreat every time he intended to. The commander in chief refused to put up a fight despite Bagration's numerous urging. De Tolly's continuing resistance to give battle would later lead to his removal from his position.

=== Battle of Mogilev ===
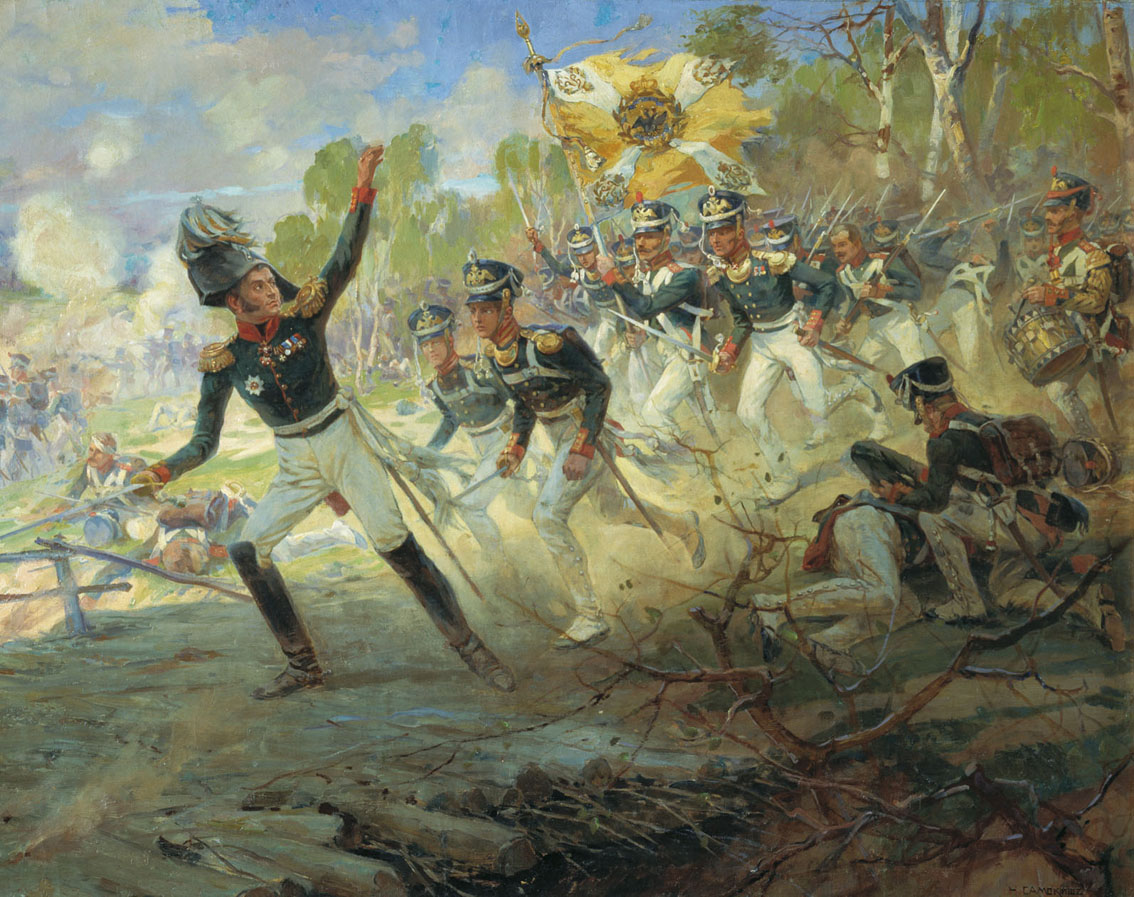
General Raevsky personally leading his men into Davout's line

The battle of Mogilev, better known as Battle of Saltanovka, was the result of Bagration's unsuccessful attempt to unite with the Russian main army after he had suggested a pre-emptive strike on the French to tsar Alexander. His 2nd army got intercepted when trying to reach Barclay de Tolly's 1st army and clashed with Marshal Davout's forces at the Dnieper river. In order to break through the French lines at Mogilev, Bagration deployed the 20,000 men strong 7th corps led by General Nikolay Raevsky. On the opposing side marshal Davout's corps consisting of five divisions with a total strength of 28,000 men had formed defensive lines around Saltanovka. Davout waited for the approaching Russians and set them under massive musket volleys and artillery fire. Raevsky continued the advance personally leading his men in the assault. Despite great determination of the Russian troops, the French managed to repel the attack along the entire line. Davout then mounted a counter assault which threw the 7th corps back, although Raevsky was able to fend them off repeatedly until Bagration decided to order a general retreat when his army got also struck by other French forces at the flanks and rear. In order to avoid complete envelopement he quickly withdrew to Smolensk. Both sides suffered heavy losses, but Bagration misjudged the situation, believing he fought Napoleon's main army when it was only Davout's forces and some reinforcement. This highlighted the poor communication between the Russian armies. However at the same time Bagration's decision to withdraw thwarted Napoleon's plan to destroy the Second Western Army and he was eventually forced to fight a unified Russian force at Smolensk, which is what happened because Bagration fearing another attack, retreated to Smolensk and waited for Barclay to reinforce him.

=== Battle of Smolensk ===
On 14 August 1812, the three Marshals Murat, Davout and Ney crossed the Dnieper River on quickly constructed pontoon bridges. The plan was to race toward the city of Smolensk, taking it without a fight. Napoleon saw Smolensk as a vital supply and replenishment base from where he would march to the north to attack the rear of the Russian main forces under Barclay de Tolly. The town had also symbolic, religious importance for the Russian side. Unfortunately for the French, conflicting orders and a breakdown in communication had already led Bagration to disobey orders and instead of marching west, he occupied Smolensk to the south. By 16 August, French forces found the city heavily garrisoned by Bagration's troops. He got further reinforced with the arrival of de Tolly's army. Napoleon, however, assumed the Russians would fight outside the city to avoid the destruction of historical monuments, which did not happen. The fight for Smolensk started on 16 August 1812 with Napoleon's forces of three corps capturing parts of the town's suburbs but being repelled soon after. Continuous artillery shelling set the town, which consisted of mostly wooden buildings, ablaze, but the French didn't manage to get past the suburbs and to the walls as they lacked ladders and other equipment. Inflicting heavy losses on the attackers, the Russian garrison was able to hold its positions. However, the widespread fire forced Bagration and de Tolly to abandon burning Smolensk on 18 August 1812. The battle ended inconclusively, with the Russian armies retreating and Napoleon conquering but as quickly leaving what was left of the city as it was of no use anymore.

=== Guerrilla warfare ===
From the very beginning of the invasion, Bagration had understood that the invasion was not an ordinary one, but rather a nationwide war. Local citizenry displayed great bravery where they could against small French units, particularly around Smolensk but also in other parts of Russia. Sporadic attacks from small diversionary groups of lightly armed peasants had already caught Bagration's attention earlier and he was fascinated by their determination and effectiveness. From then on he was convinced that a smart cooperation between irregular forces and the regular Russian armies would be the only method to stop Napoleon's advance. His aide-de-camp, vice Colonel D.V. Davydov, commander of a Hussar regiment, shared Bagration's views on a guerrilla movement and proposed a possible course of action. Bagration approved the proposal but, when he presented the plans to Kutuzov, the commander in chief only allowed a very limited number of troops to be provided for such operations. Davydov gave his word that he would take full care and responsibility for the supplies and action of his troops, only dissatisfied about the resources he considered very insufficient, asking Bagration to give him at least 1,000 Cossacks. Bagration, much as he wanted to meet his officer's request and carry out that operation himself, did not want to disobey Kutuzov, and replied: "I would give you 3,000 of them to start with, for I do not like to act superficially, but I can not even speak about it; Knyaz (ie the Prince) has defined the composition of the group himself; it is necessary to obey." Afterwards Bagration wrote the following instruction to Davydov:

To Vice-Colonel of Akhtyrka Hussar Regiment Davydov.

After reception of this, take hundred fifty Cossacks from Major-General Karpov and fifty Hussars of the Akhtyrka Hussar Regiment.

I order you to take all measures to disturb the enemy and to endeavor to deprive him of supplies, not only on the flanks, but in the middle and in the rear, to upset transport and parks, to break ferries and to take away all remedies. In a word, I am sure that, having made to you such an important allowance, you will prove your quickness and diligence and that will justify my choice. You can send official reports to me at every convenient chance you have. Nobody should know about your movements; try to keep them shrouded in the most impenetrable secrecy. As to the foodstuffs of your command, you should take responsibility upon yourself...

Bagration then also wrote letters to General Vassilichikov and General Karpov regarding the allocations and general information about the best Cossack and Hussar units available. On the request of Davydov he provided the vice colonel a copy of his map of the Smolensk province and when parting wished the young officer the best of luck, and also hoped for his success. His confidence would soon be emphasized when the guerrilla movement developed wide scope. Soon, besides Davydov's movement, other groups emerged: those of General Dorokhov, Captain Fisher, Captain Seslavin, Colonel Kudashev and many others. These groups successfully strove against the French, combining their activities with those of peasant guerrilla groups. Bagration became the author of the first real tactical instructions for such activities and one of the founders of the Russian guerrilla movement against Napoleon.

=== Battle of Borodino ===
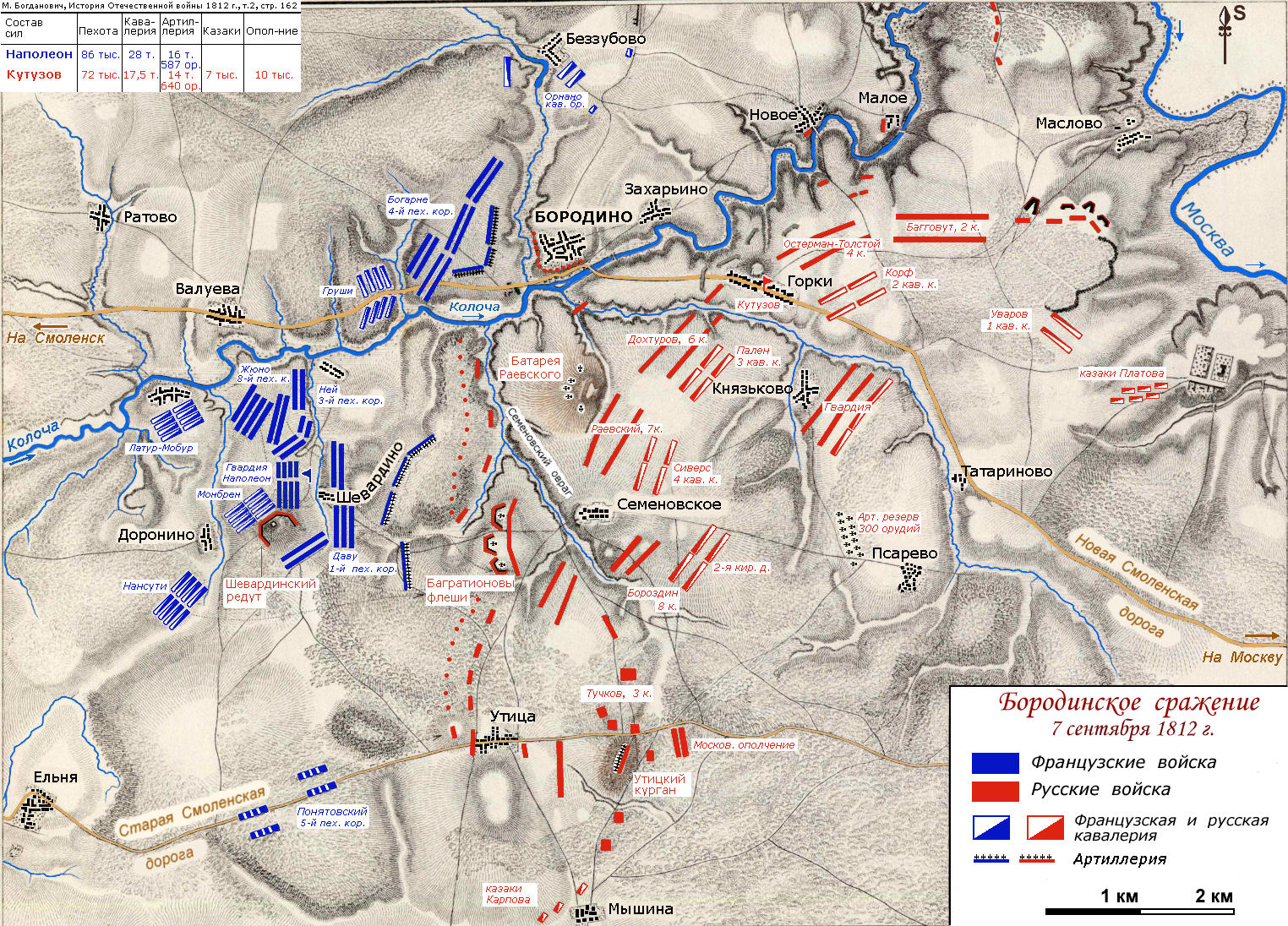
The Bagration flèches were at the center of the Battle of Borodino. There, the most brutal fighting took place.

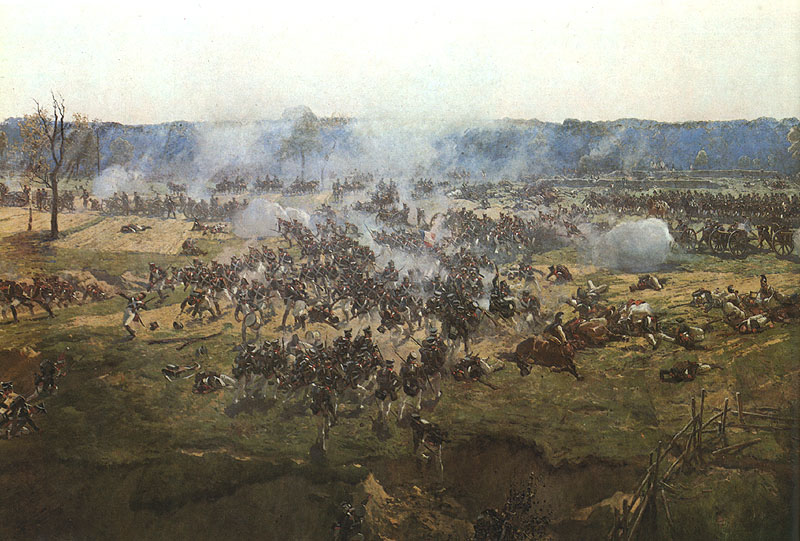
The Bagration flèches seen on the far right. Painting by Franz Roubaud.

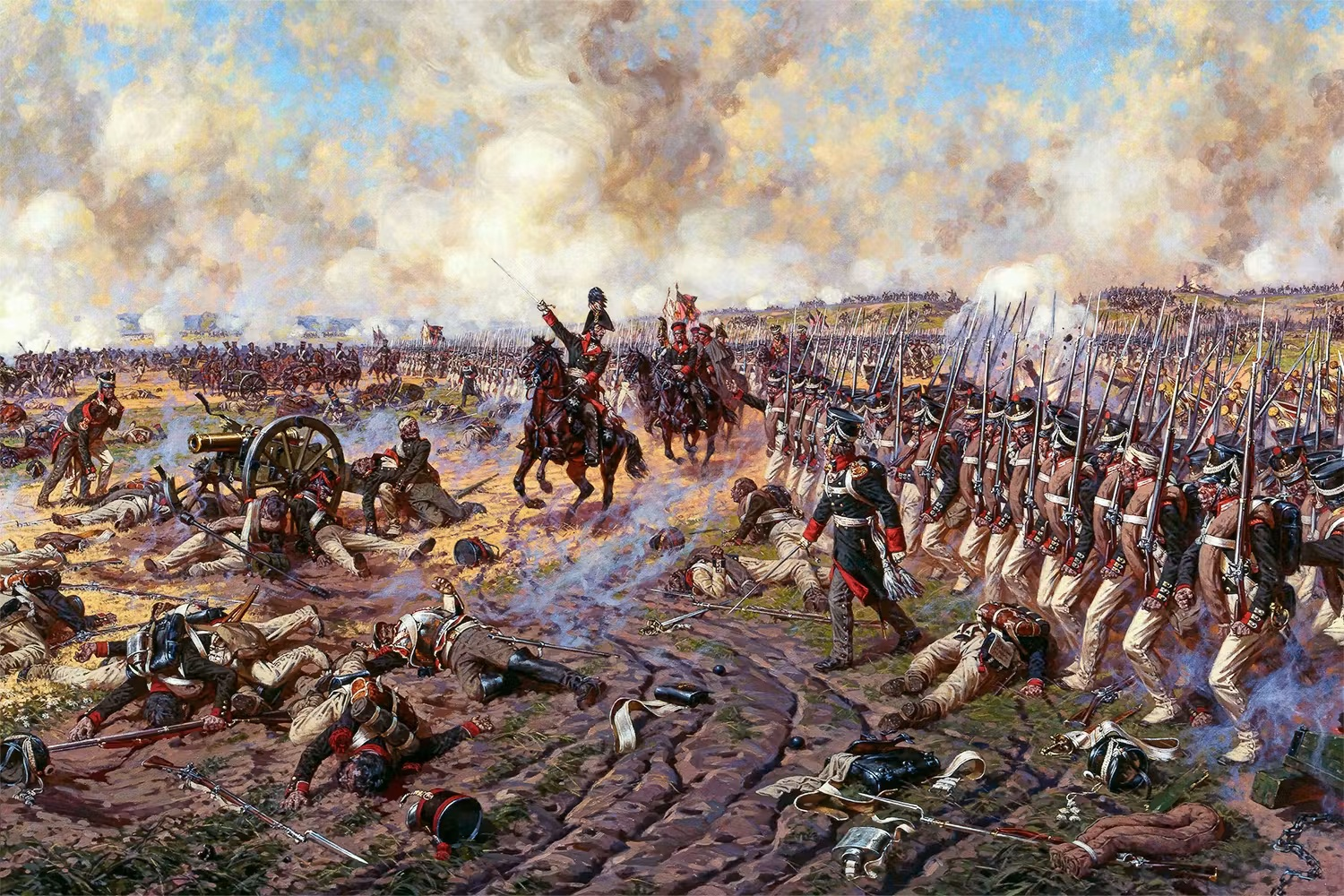
Bagration encouraging advancing Russian troops at Borodino

Fearing that Napoleon might take the Smolensk Road to Moscow, Kutuzov ordered Bagration and his 2nd Army to the left while Barclay de Tolly was guarding the right with the 1st Army. Other than the 1st Army, which was deployed on positions which were strong and virtually unassailable by the French, Bagration's army had no terrain advantage at all and his request to change to a more advantageous position was denied by Kutuzov. So he decided to create one himself by ordering his sappers to construct four big Redans, also known as the Bagration flèches, four arrow-head shaped, open-backed earthworks which arced out to the left en echelon in front of the Kolocha stream. When the battle started on 7 September 1812 with a massive cannonade against the Russian center, Davout sent two divisions against the flèches at about 6 am. His force of 25,000 men supported by 102 guns faced 8,000 Russian defenders with 50 guns.

While advancing, Davout's divisions were hit hard by massed Russian artillery, which was deployed on the other side of the Kolcha to support Bagration's lines and also by Russian jaeger units that were deployed in front of the fortifications. The French troops suffered heavy casualties before they could reach their objective and the undertaking was about to fall apart when Davout saw his troops retreating and rushed forward to personally lead the charge. With the second attempt he managed to take the southernmost flèche at 7 am. But in response Bagration ordered Raevsky and his 7th Corps once more to confront Davout, only this time the French were struck on their flank and thrown back for the second time. Napoleon already held Bagration in high esteem, calling him the best the Russians could possibly throw against him, but was surprised by the stiff resistance he offered. While Napoleon reinforced Davout with Marshal Ney and officer Junot for a third attack, Bagration repositioned his troops and deployed his reserves, the 2nd Grenadier and 2nd Cuirassier divisions.

The 3rd Infantry Division was still held in reserve at Semyenovskoe for the possibility that the French might try to outflank him. Kutuzov, who observed the heavy fighting at the flèches, was sending the 2nd and parts of the 5th Infantry Corps with 100 guns from his artillery reserve, but their arrival would take one to two hours, which meant that Bagration was on his own. Napoleon demanded that the flèches be taken at all costs, and opened the third offensive with a massive artillery bombardment, followed by a simultaneous infantry and cavalry assault. At first the French managed to occupy the right and far left flèche but were again driven out by Bagration's troops. Marshal Poniatowski, who had the task of enveloping the Russians and striking Bagration's rear with his cavalry corps, was also defeated by Tuchkov's 3rd Infantry Corps. The defenders restored their positions at 9 am. Failing for a third time, Napoleon became furious and now also added Marshal Murat to the operation, launching a fourth assault at 9 am. This time Napoleon's forces were not only able to drive Bagration's forces out of the flèches but also captured Semyenovskoe.

By this time however, the 2nd and 5th corps sent earlier by Kutuzov for Bagration's aid finally arrived and Bagration threw all available forces against the French, repulsing them completely from all occupied positions and inflicting heavy losses. After that, three more French attacks were repelled in a row, General Tuchkov being killed in the fifth assault. Despite the mounting casualties, Napoleon continued to assault Bagration's position. His troops were hit not only by musket fire but also canister shot from artillery at close range. Heaps of corpses and wounded prevented the cavalry and infantry from manoeuvring properly on the battlefield. Napoleon considered sending his elite Imperial Guard to bolster the morale of his troops but hesitated, not willing to risk it being torn apart as well. At noon, the French launched their eighth assault, with around 45,000 men supported by 400 guns against the defending 18,000 Russians and their 300 guns. Bagration decided to meet the attackers boldly in what led to a long and brutal melee, probably the bloodiest scene during the entire battle, described by the historian Buturlin as follows:

An awful combat took place in which, on both sides, miracles of almost supernatural bravery were displayed. The infantry, cavalrymen, and gunners of both sides, having got mixed up together, presented an awful spectacle of the great bulk of soldiers struggling in private, furious despair.

Bagration ordered his entire force to counterattack, but was seriously outnumbered and slowly driven back. The French 57th Line Infantry Regiment kept attacking the flèches, even though it was almost completely torn to pieces by musket fire from all directions. Their courageous behaviour earned two "Bravo" shouts from Bagration, and it was then that the 2nd commander-in chief was struck by shell splinters in his leg. His subordinates quickly carried him to a safe place away from the fight while trying to conceal what had happened, but Bagration's absence was soon noticed. Rumours of him being killed spread and the morale of his troops began to increasingly waver. Bagration, now unable to control the situation, insisted on not being moved from the field until the battle was decided, hoping for the success of the 2nd Cuirassier Division of General Duka. The Cuirassiers managed to defeat the forces of Marshal Ney but the news of Bagration being hit quickly spread and brought confusion and morale collapse within the 2nd Army. Its management broke down so that the Russian forces were starting to abandon their positions in the chaos and to retreat from the overwhelming French assault. The Bagration flèches were abandoned and left to the French, but it had cost them a huge price. From the 60,000 French soldiers who participated in the operation, about 30,000 were killed or wounded. Russian casualties were also high, but fewer. The battle, however, ended inconclusively, with both sides returning to their initial deployment zones. The battle drained from Napoleon his last fighting capabilities and resources and finally forced him to abandon his plan of forcing Russia into a second Tilsit when he entered an empty Moscow.

Bagration was evacuated to Simy (today Sima), a village in the Vladimir province, and died there of his wound on 24 September 1812 at the age of 47.

== Tactics and doctrine ==
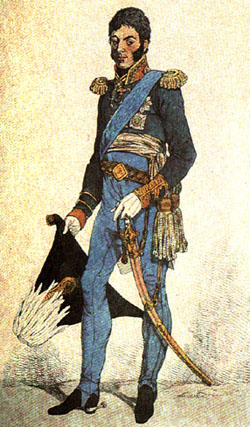
Bagration by D. Dayton, 1814

Bagration, heavily influenced by Alexander Suvorov, was an innovative tactician who favoured mobile offensive warfare, even though many of the battles in which he was engaged with the French were of a defensive nature. He refused what he perceived as obsolete positioning tactics and instead would give the Russian army strategic objects and tactical manoeuvers, always going for the quick confrontation, where speed and accuracy were most important, in order to deny the enemy any chance to react, respond or even organize. This led to much tension and rivalry between him and general Barclay de Tolly, who was given overall command and relied mostly on the search for adequate positions to entrench and wait for the enemy. Bagration's applied doctrines were ahead of their time solid concepts for both offensive and defensive warfare, as even his retreats were conducted in equally good and impressive fashion, given the sometimes impossible odds he was facing.

Bagration's strategic views defined also his insights about the character of tactical military action. It is possible to discern these insights by considering the famous order to the forces of the 2nd Western Army, dated 25 June 1812. In the order, written by Bagration with his own hand, instructions were given concerning actions to be taken against the French armies if they invaded Russian territory. He wrote:

For us, it is necessary to attack them bravely, quickly, not to become engaged in shooting matches; artillery must fire precisely, irregular armies must try to surround their flanks and rear. ... The regular cavalry attacks quickly, but as a part of concerted action, without dividing into small bodies. Squadrons must support each other in the attack, not forgetting to provide for reserves and flanks. The cavalry should be located under the chess order.

Attacks were to be conducted with troops formed in columns:

Commanders of Corps must try to turn all attention to attacking the enemy with bayonets, using columns, and to attack until the enemy retreats. The horse artillery should operate energetically, as should cavalry, but harmoniously and without the slightest confusion. It is especially necessary when the enemy has strong reserves and may frustrate our attacking forces; for that we must try to have our forces in columns and in readiness, and as soon as everyone is driven into flight, then the Cossacks must prick and harass them, with the regular forces in close and harmonious support.

Bagration recommended deployment of the forces in a battle array that was not too closely packed, but sufficiently so as to permit soldiers to feel each other's presence with their elbows. In case of counter-attacks by enemy cavalry, Bagration advised the use of battalion masses and squares, or carrés. "When the enemy cavalry attacks infantry, it takes only a minute to form either a column closed on all sides, or a battalion in a carré."

With the purpose of increasing the enthusiasm of armies, all attacks were to be made with a shout, and during the approach the drums were to be beaten and music to be played.

Similar insights are reflected in a number of Bagration's other orders, instructions, and letters. In particular, as characteristic of his tactical perspective, the "Manual for Infantry Officers on the Day of Battle" may serve as an example. This document was prepared on the basis of the "Manual to Officers of the Narva infantry Regiment," authored by M.S. Vorontsov in 1812. According to military historian P. Simansky, Vorontsov's manual "was strongly influenced by Suvorov's precepts, and was appraised by the most favorite disciple of Suvorov, Prince Bagration; it was slightly corrected by him, as in some places it concerned only Narva infantry Regiment, and then in July 1812 it was dispatched to all units of the 2nd Army." The "Manual to Infantry Officers on the Day of Battle" recognized the offensive as the fundamental form of combat. The principal manifestation of offensive combat was the bayonet attack, concluded with a vigorous pursuit of the defeated enemy. This manual considered in detail the question of action in separate lines and in columns and about conducting aimed fire. The necessity of maintaining close communication of skirmishers with their columns was specified; movement forward was to be determined only by an order of the chief of division or battalion. If it was necessary to operate on separate lines in forests, it was suggested to hold a reserve behind one of the flanks in order to have an opportunity to suddenly envelope the flank of a counter-attacking enemy.

Attacks by enemy cavalry acting in separate lines were to be met by fire, after allowing the enemy to advance to within approximately 150 paces; after that it would be necessary to divide into small groups of ten and repulse the enemy by fire and bayonets until the approach of reinforcements. Upon approaching, reinforcements were to be redeployed from a column into square, firing on enemy cavalry from a distance of 150 paces. The "Manual" demanded that officers demonstrate constant care for their soldiers, to remind them of their duties and their oath, to explain what was required of them during military action. Special attention was given to the maintenance of trust in the virtue of "Russian bayonets", a spirit of boldness, courage and persistence in the fight. "Persistence and courage," declared the "Manual", "have won more battles than all other military talents taken altogether."

Dissemination of all rumors of disaster and panic, such as "We are cut off!", were categorically forbidden, under the threat of severe punishment. It was specified in the "Manual" that: "Brave people are never cut off; wherever the enemy goes, turn your breast to follow and defeat him." Thus, in the field of tactics, as well as in the field of strategy, Bagration acted as an innovator, a convinced supporter of decisive offensive action. He doggedly introduced advanced tactics; he dispensed with obsolete positional tactics and applied tactics of columns in a combination with separate lines. Paying great attention to the value of offensive combat, Bagration at the same time did not reject the opportunity to conduct defensive operations. He creatively approached planning for his assigned tasks, applying such forms of combat as provided exactly the right answers to particular circumstances. His practical legacy offers experience rich in the conduct of offensive battles as well as the development and practice of waging both advance and rear guard fights.

Bagration constantly worried about his soldiers' health, taking measures so that they'd be well clothed and timely fed. S.G. Volkonsky, who during the Franco-Russian conflict of 1806–1807 was frequently in Bagration's group, wrote:

... I visited several times an avant garde where many of my friends were serving at Prince Bagration's headquarters. The hospitable manner of the Prince with subordinates, amicable relations between themselves, harmony, cleanliness in tents, the fresh and pleased appearance of the lower grades, proved the Prince's good treatment and attitude toward them, and in all hearts the pledge of general trust in him.]

While showing concern for the soldiers, Bagration at the same time demanded the maintenance of the strictest military discipline, considering it to be the foundation of military ability. "In military service," he wrote, "the first objective is order, subordination, discipline, unanimity and friendship". Above all, Bagration was extremely demanding of himself. "...To execute the will of the sovereign, of the emperor and my commanders is the most sacred obligation which I follow and obey at every step of my service... I love soldiers, I respect their bravery, and equally I demand order and discipline." Armies under Bagration's command were always distinguished for their high discipline, and, in some sense, this was one of the main reasons for their brilliant victories over their enemies.

== Honours and legacy ==
On 15 October 1800, Bagration was granted the hereditary title of a Prince of the Russian Empire (Kniaz Bagration) by the Emperor Paul I. He was also awarded the Orders of St Andrew (1810), of St. Alexander Nevsky (1807), of the St Vladimir, 1st class (1809), of the St Anna, 1st class (1800), the St George 2nd class (1805) and made a commander of the Order of St John of Jerusalem (1800). He was further honoured with a gold sword of honour for bravery (1808). Bagration's foreign awards also included the Prussian Orders of the Red Eagle (1807) and the Black Eagle (1807), the Austrian Military Order of Maria Theresa, 2nd class (1799) and the Sardinian Order of Saints Maurice and Lazarus, 1st Class (1799).

He is a secondary character in Leo Tolstoy's epic 1869 novel War and Peace. In the 1960s Russian movie War and Peace, he is played by Giuli Chokhonelidze, who repeated the role in the 1985 Russian biopic Bagrationi. In the 2016 BBC TV adaptation of War and Peace, he is played by Pip Torrens.

Tsar Nicholas I had a monument erected in his honour on the battlefield of Borodino. The general's remains were transferred to the place where he had fallen and remain there to this day. The grave was blown up during World War II (reputedly, the local museum authorities were able to save only shreds of bone and cloth from the grave) but has since then been restored.

Joseph Stalin chose Bagration as the name of the Soviet offensive launched on 22 June 1944 that defeated the German Army Group Centre and drove the forces of Nazi Germany out of what is now Belarus. After the war, the Soviet Union annexed northern East Prussia, and the until-then German town of Preußisch Eylau—the scene of the 1807 battle—was renamed Bagrationovsk in his memory.

An asteroid 3127 Bagration is named after Prince Bagration.

In Moscow, the Bagrationovskaya metro station, Bagration pass in Filyovsky Park District and the Bagration Bridge, which commemorates the 850th year of the city, were named in his honour. Many streets across the different cities in Russia also hold his name.

In August 2023, a new highway near Kutuzovsky Prospekt, was named Bagration Avenue.

In the 20th and 21st centuries, at least 15 ships were associated with the name of P.I. Bagration.

== Quotes about Bagration ==
- "Russia has no good generals. The only exception is Bagration." (Napoleon)
- "Prince Bagration—the most excellent general, worthy of highest degrees." (Alexander Suvorov)
- "Bagration – Lion of the Russian army." (Alexander Chernyshyov)

== See also ==
- Bagration Bridge
- Bagration flèches
- Operation Bagration

== Sources ==
- Baynes, T. S., ed. (1878), "Prince Peter Bagration" , Encyclopædia Britannica, vol. 3 (9th ed.), New York: Charles Scribner's Sons, p. 235
- Chisholm, Hugh, ed. (1911), "Prince Peter Bagration" , Encyclopædia Britannica, vol. 3 (11th ed.), Cambridge University Press, pp. 206–207
- Danilewsky, Michailowsky; Goldhammer, Carl R. (1840), Geschichte des vaterländischen Krieges im Jahre 1812, Vol. II, Riga: Edmund Götschel. (in German)
- Dumin, S.V., ed. (1996), Дворянские роды Российской империи [Noble families of the Russian Empire], Vol. III (in Russian), Moscow: Linkominvest
- Mikaberidze, Alexander (2000), Peter Bagration: The Lion of the Russian Army
- Mikaberidze, Alexander (2009), Burnham, Robert (ed.), Peter Bagration: The Best Georgian General of the Napoleonic Wars, The Napoleon Series
- Pollock, Sean (2012), Norris, Stephen M.; Sunderland, Willard (eds.), "Petr Ivanovich Bagration (1765–1812)," in Russia's People of Empire: Life Stories from Eurasia, 1500 to the Present, Bloomington: Indiana University Press, pp. 93–103
- Pluchart, Adolphe (1835), Encyclopedic Lexicon, vol. 4, St. Petersburg: Типография А. Плюшара, pp. 60–61
- "Багратион, Петр Иванович"
