= Battle of Tataritsa =

1809 battle during the Russo-Turkish War

- Part of the Russo-Turkish War (1806–1812)
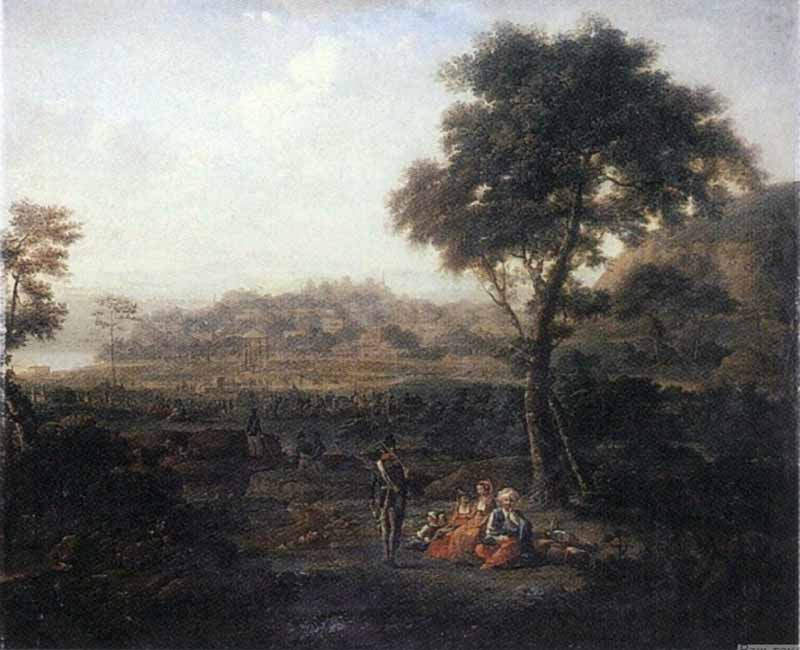
- Russian siege camp near Silistra, painting by Ermolay Esakov
Date	22 October 1809 (Note: According to the Julian calendar, is 10 October)
Location	Tataritsa, near Silistra, Ottoman Empire (present-day Bulgaria)
Result	Ottoman victory
Territorial changes	Bagration lifts the siege of Silistra and withdraws beyond the Danube

Belligerents
Ottoman Empire	Russia

Commanders and leaders
Ibrahim Pasha; Muhtar Pasha; Yusuf Pasha (Note: Although he did not participate in the battle, he was the reason the Russians retreated as he advanced towards Silistra with 20,000 men.)	Pyotr Bagration; Ivan Paskevich; Pavel Palen; Vasily Trubetskoy

Strength
c. 60,000 (Note: An estimated 39,000 to 40,000 are said to have participated in the battle if there was indeed a total of 60,000.)	20,000 to 25,000 (Note: 20,000; 25,000)

Casualties and losses
2,000 to 2,200 casualties	333 to 1,000 casualties (Note: 333; 500; 1,000)

The battle of Tataritsa (Note: Russian: Битва под Татарицей, romanized: Bitwa pod Tataritcey; Turkish: Tatariçe muharebesi; Bulgarian: Битката при Татарица) was an encounter fought at the Ottoman village of Tataritsa (Aydemir) on 22 October [O.S. 10 October] 1809 between Ottoman and Russian forces. As a strategic result of the battle, the Ottoman army was able to force Pyotr Bagration to lift the siege of Silistra. Tactically, neither side achieved impressive success; although Bagration managed to withstand the Ottoman onslaught, he left the battlefield upon the arrival of Ottoman reinforcements, and, as a strategic consequence, lifted the siege. From an operational point of view, it was an Ottoman success, since the tactical outcome resulted in a strategic Ottoman victory.

The main task of the Russians was to besiege the fortress of Silistra, against which the main forces of Pyotr Bagration moved with the aim of taking the city and gaining a foothold in the region. Grand Vizier Kör Yusuf Ziyaüddin Pasha and Pehlivan Ibrahim Pasha acted against Bagration with the goal of unblocking the city in case of its siege.

== Background ==
=== Before the start of campaign ===
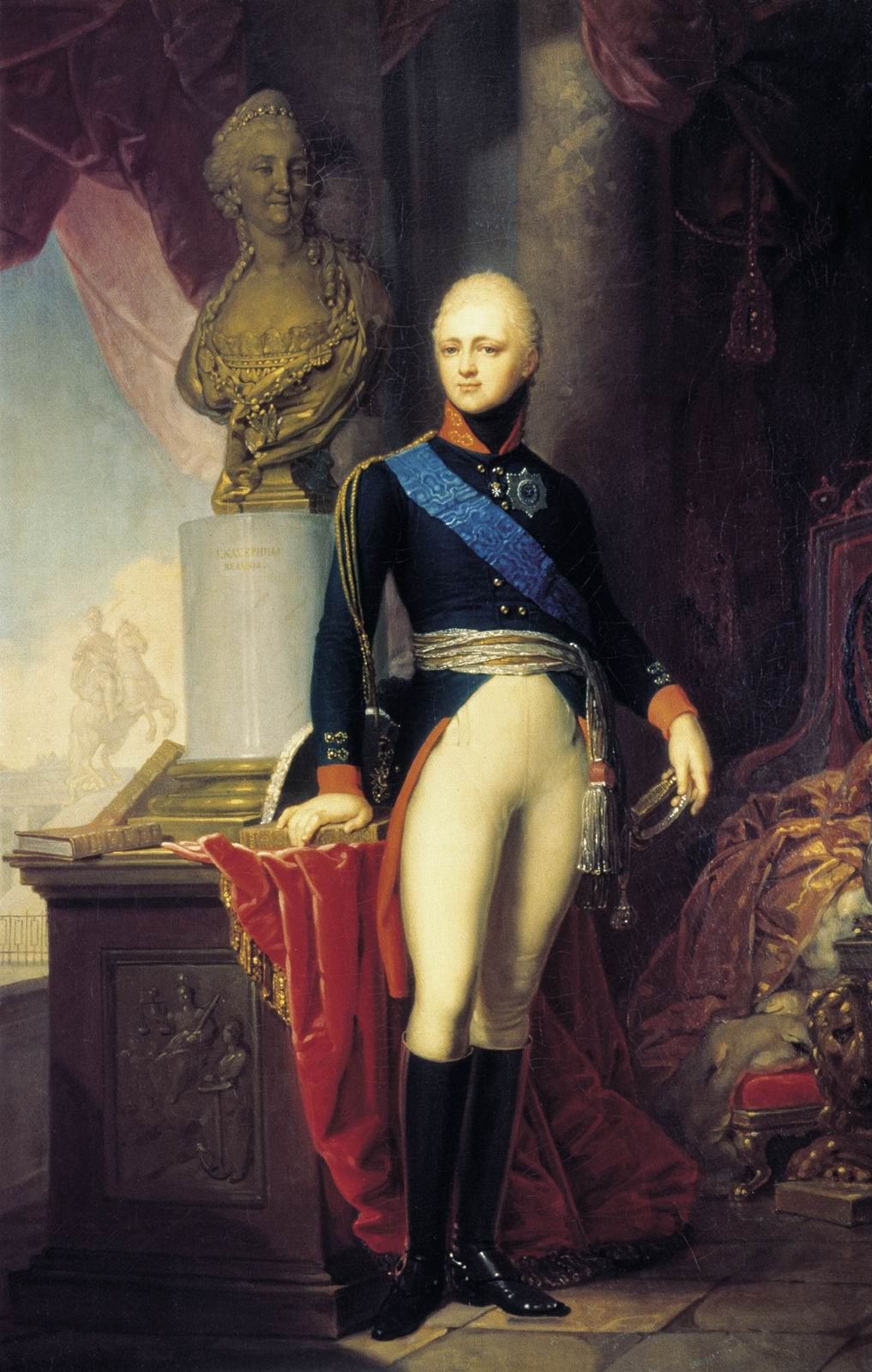
Young Alexander I of Russia, The monarch of Russia during the war

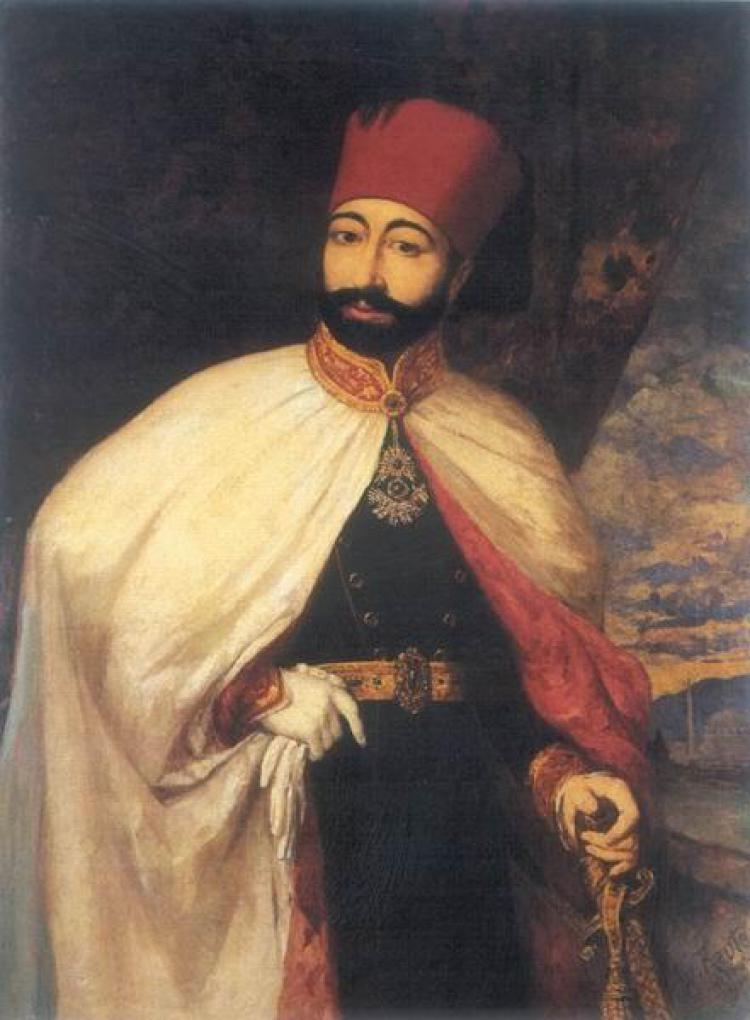
Mahmud II, Sultan of Ottoman Empire during war

The Russo-Turkish war, which began in 1806, went slowly and was interrupted by peace negotiations. After their failure, Emperor Alexander ordered an offensive in such a way as to force the Turks to conclude peace near Constantinople. To do this, it was necessary to take a strong line of fortresses along the Danube. In the spring of 1809, most of the Ottoman forces were sent to Serbia to suppress the national uprising. The Russians had to wait until the summer so that the water in the Danube subsided. There were about 50,000 Ottoman regular troops on the Danubian Front of the war, which should have been enough for a defensive victory.

=== Campaign ===
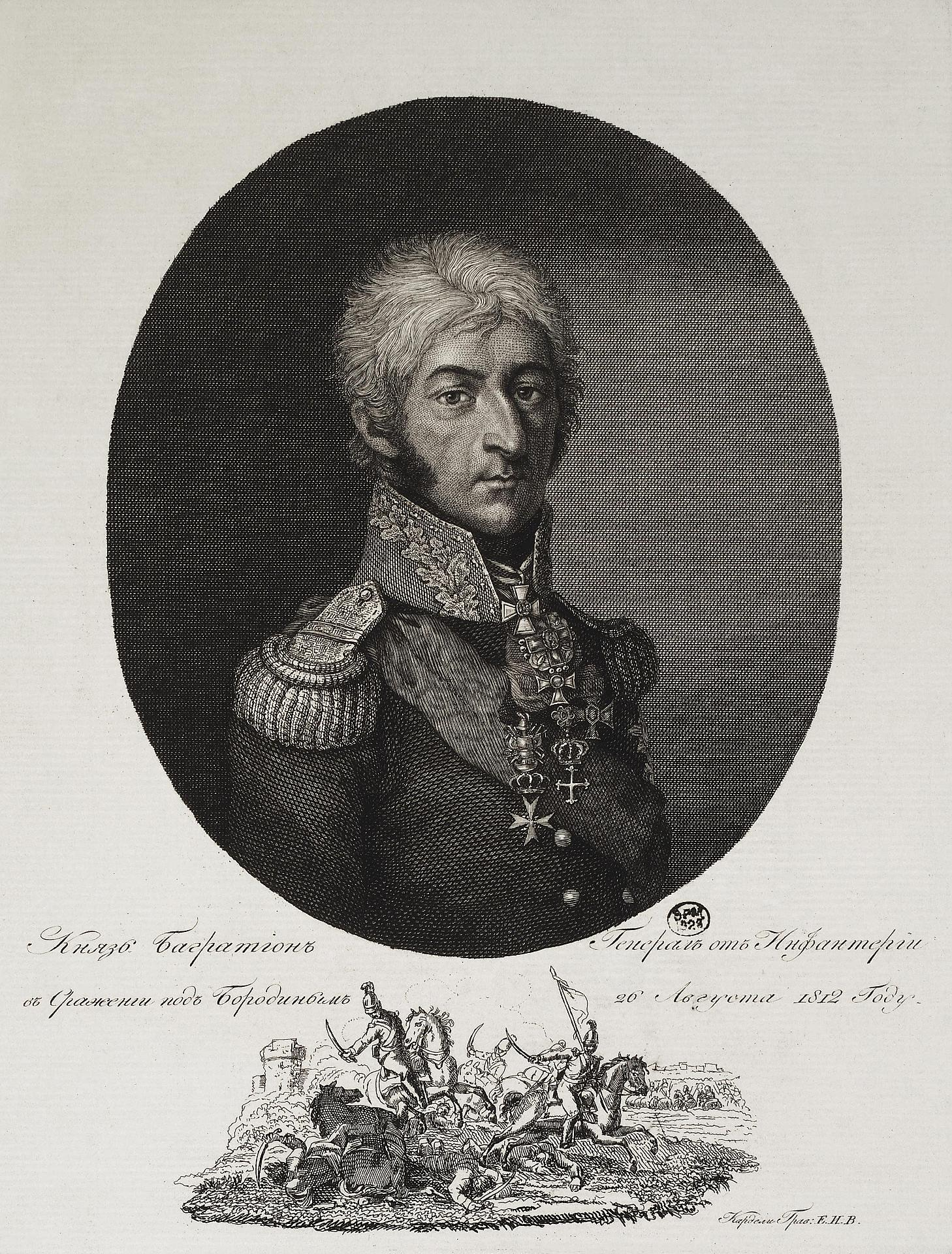
Pyotr Bagration, Commander of Russian Moldavian Army

On 26 August, Bagration's army, consisting of 25,000 soldiers, of whom 20,000 were infantry, launched an offensive, the ultimate goal of which was the city of Silistra. Russian troops successfully advanced in front, occupying important positions such as at Izmail in September. The Ottoman troops tried to stop the advance at Ressevat, but were defeated, resulting in 5,000 Turkish servicemen dead or captured. On 11 September, the siege of Silistra began. The garrison had 11,000, or 12,000 men at its disposal and was very active, making sorties that usually ended in failure.

=== Forces of the parties ===
As before, Bagration had about 20,000 to 25,000 under his command, and with these forces he had to stubbornly hold the siege and repel attempts that were aimed at diminishing his goal. The ground forces of the Turks initially amounted to 20,000, but 8,000 Albanians led by Muhtar Pasha, the son of Ali Pasha of Ioannina, arrived during the battle. The 11,000 to 12,000-strong garrison also actively assisted in the battle, and in total there were 39,000 Ottoman soldiers fighting against the Russians. The total number of the army of Ibrahim Pahsha was 30,000. Bagration faced them with 4,500 to 15,000 troops.

== Battle ==
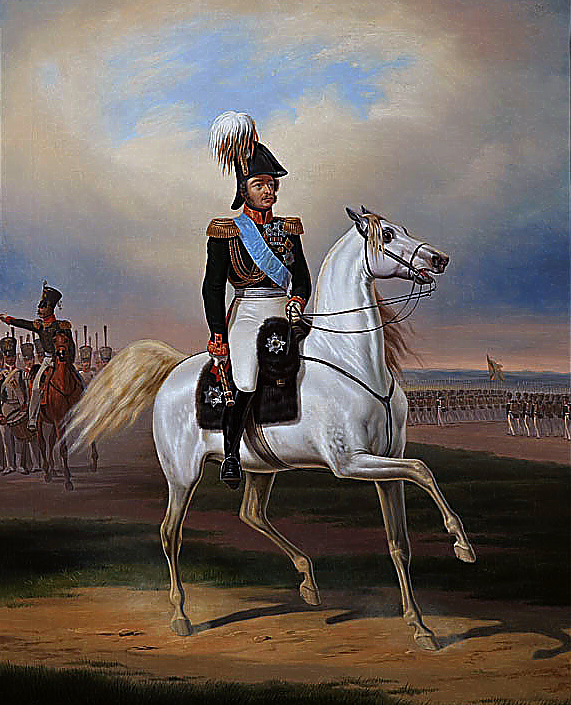
Ivan Paskevich, a participant in the battle, for which he was awarded the Order of St. Anne

The entirety of 9 October was spent in preparation for the battle. Bagration planned to attack first, despite the numerical superiority of his enemies. Ottoman general Pehlivan Ibrahim Pasha knew about this, and strengthened the trenches in the village.

At 4 a.m., Cossacks attacked and knocked down the Turkish cavalry, which retreated back to their trenches. At 7 a.m., the bulk of the Russian infantry moved to the front with orders to occupy the Turkish trenches. At this time, Albanian infantry came to the aid of the Ottomans. With this, they launched a counteroffensive against the Russians.

=== Square ===
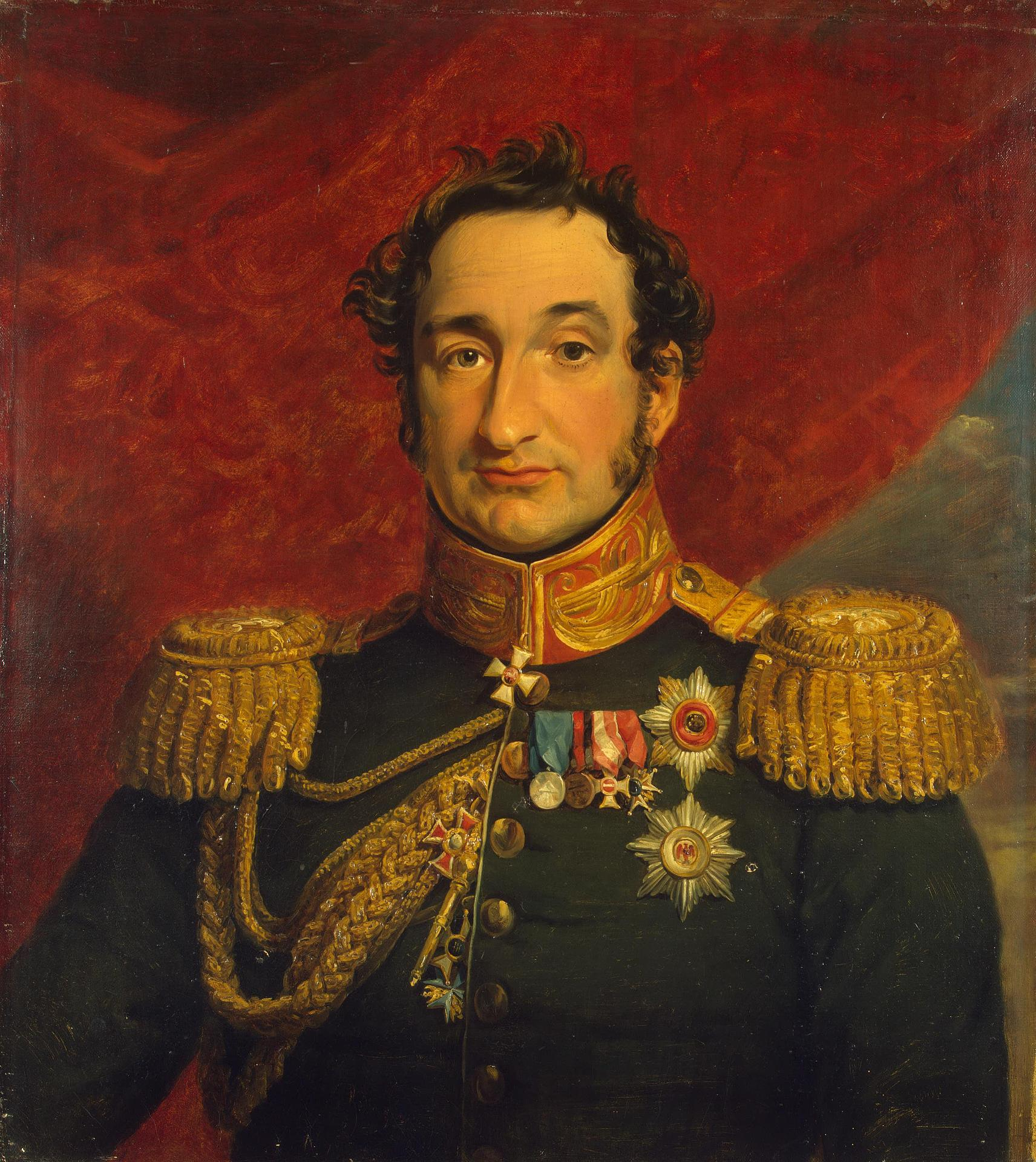
Vasily Trubetskoy, one of the Russian generals during the battle

Meeting the unexpected onslaught of the Ottomans, the Russian cavalry turned back in a disorderly withdrawal. At this time, the infantry began to form an infantry square, of which the first attack of the Turks on it failed. There were three large squares in total: Under the commands of Ivan Paskevich, Pavel Palen, and Vasily Trubetskoy.

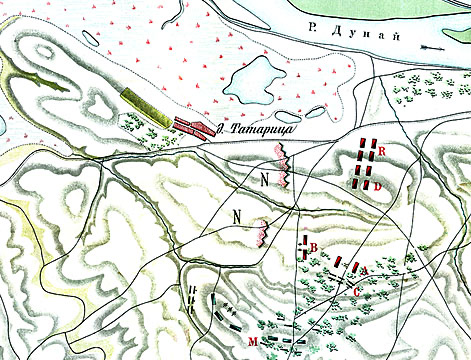
Battle plan near the village of Tataritsa, 22 October [O.S. 10 October] 1809

Retreating cavalry and Cossacks were eliminated from the battle, and the brunt of the attacks shifted to the infantry. Having received reinforcements, the Turks repeated their attacks, this time forcing part of the forces to enter. This resulted in the connection between the three Russian squares to br lost. By the middle of the day, Palen made his way to join Paskevich and asked him to start a retreat, to which he received a playful answer: "True, we can die, but we can fight back!". Part of the Russian dragoons that contacted the infantry decided to dismount, thereby increasing their effectiveness in battle. At the same time, Trubetskoy was able to recover two lost guns. His success was complemented by the fact that reinforcements arrived, and the Russian right flank was finally able to repel the Turkish onslaught. Attempts by the garrison to help the attackers were also unsuccessful.

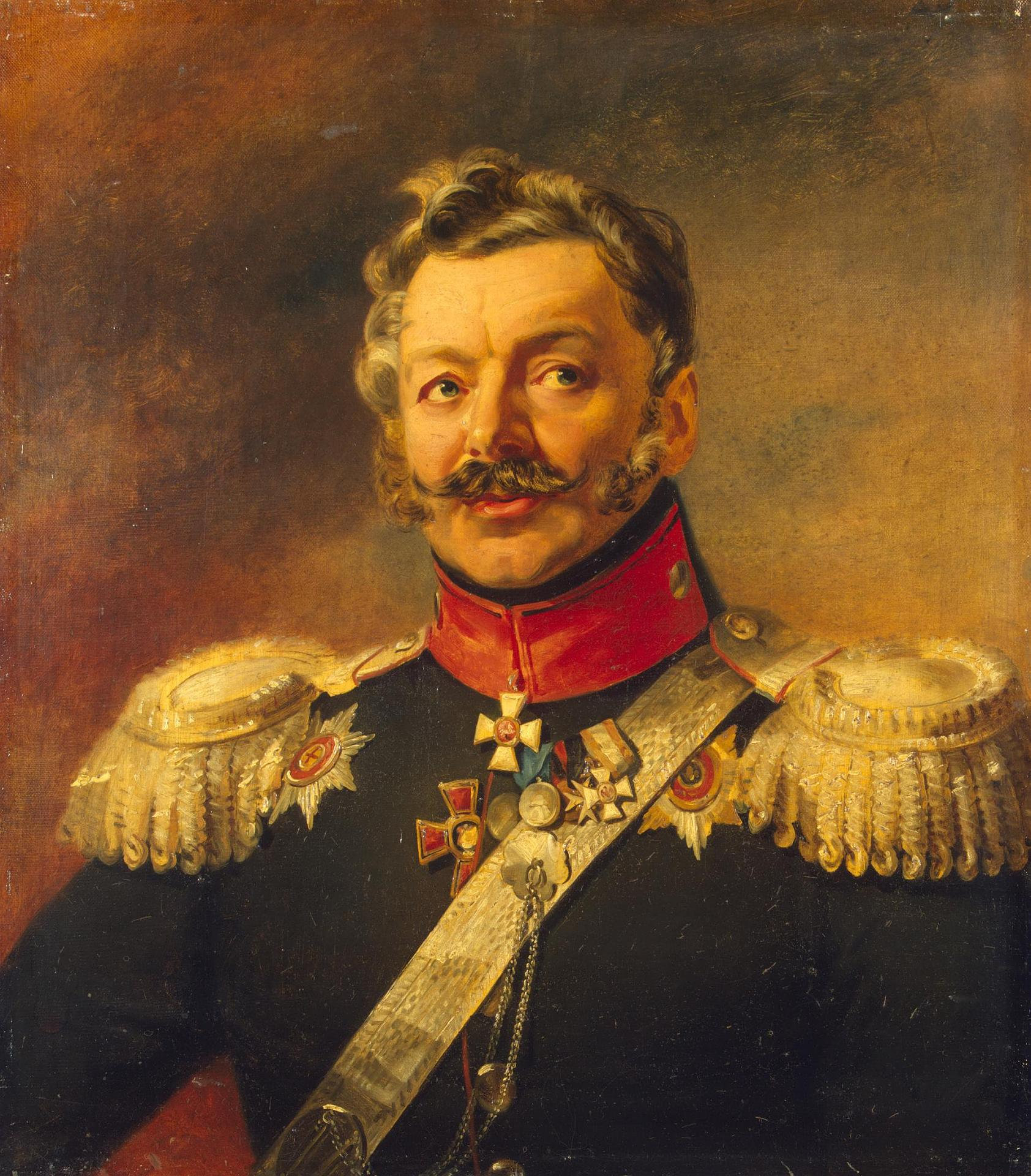
Count Pavel Palen, one of the general during the battle

The participation of the Albanian corps put the Russians in a dangerous position. Paskevich understood that the artillery of the Turks was causing him great damage, and that they would not be able to hold their positions with continuous rifle exchanges. Thus, he decided to go on the offensive. In a mixed order, Paskevich captured the positions of the Albanians and Turks, returning the previously lost cannons. However, he could not consolidate success as the Turkish trenches were too well fortified. Thus, Paskevich decided to return to the redoubts captured earlier.

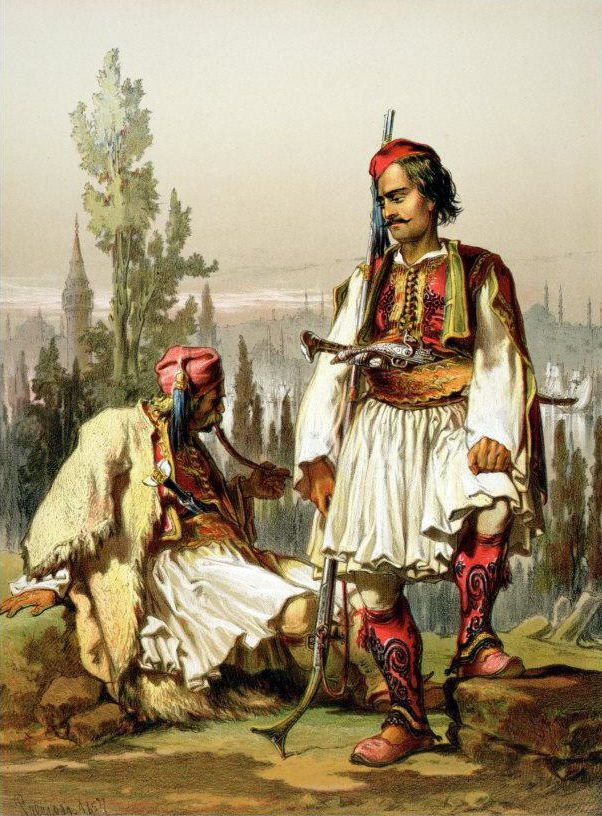
Albanian soldiers in the army of the Ottoman Empire

The Russians repulsed all attacks and prevented the direct lifting of the siege from Silistra, which led to some Russian sources to state that this specific event ended in a Russian victory. Despite this, Bagration was unhappy with the consequences of the battle. The Turkish positions were not eliminated, and another 20,000-strong army under the command of Grand Vizier Kör Yusuf Ziyaüddin Pasha was on its way to relieve Silistra. This forced Bagration on 14 October to lift the siege of Silistra and begin a retreat to Bucharest. Bagration in his report indicated a total Russian loss of 333 people; 82 dead and 251 wounded. Russian military historian Andrei Nikolaevich Petrov, on the other hand, estimates the losses of the Russian imperial army at 500 men, and the losses of the Turks at 2,000 dead, wounded and 200 captured. Modern Western sources, however, estimate the losses of the Russians at 1,000, and the Turks at 2,000.

== Results ==
The Russians were unable to achieve long-term success, so they were forced to lift the siege of Silistra, which dragged out the war for another two years. The highest society of Russia was also indignant at the results of the battle, sending letters to Bagration asking him not to go back across the Danube. However, this was not possible, because after the battle, a plague broke out in the ranks of the troops. The Moldovan army was dissolved into winter quarters after this long campaign. Bagration's inability to finally defeat the Turks led to headlines in various European newspapers stating that "if the Russians cannot 'smash the Muslim hordes,' then how will they resist Napoleon?" Bagration was at that moment developing a new plan against the Turks, but was replaced by Nikolay Kamensky.

== Aftermath ==
The successes of the Ottomans during the Bagration campaign restored hope of victory in the war, and in 1811 the Turks launched a full-scale offensive against Russia. However, this culminated in the Battle of Slobozia, where Michail Kutuzov, nicknamed the "Fox of the north", surrounded and forced the capitulation of the army of the Grand Vizier Laz Aziz Ahmed Pasha.

== Notes ==
=== Bibliography ===
- Mikhailovsky-Danilevsky, Alexander I. (1849). Полное собрание сочинений: Описание Турецкой войны с 1806 по 1812 (in Russian). Vol. 3. Saint-Petersburg: Типография отдельного корпуса стражей.
- Clodfelter, Micheal (2017). Warfare and Armed Conflicts: A Statistical Encyclopedia of Casualty and Other Figures, 1492–2015 (4 ed.). Jefferson, North Carolina: McFarland & Company. ISBN 9781476625850.
- Egorshina, O.; Petrova, A. (2023). "На страже принципов священного союза" [On guard of the principles of the holy league]. История русской армии [The history of the Russian Army] (in Russian). Moscow: Edition of the Russian Imperial Library. ISBN 978-5-699-42397-2.
- Golubov, S.; Kuznetsov, F. (1945). Генерал Багратион. Сборник документов и материалов [General Bagration. Collection of documents and materials] (in Russian). Series: Русские полководцы. Документы и материалы [Russian generals. Collection of Documents and Materials]. ОГИЗ.
- Petrov, Andrei (1887). "Действия князя Багратиона" [Actions of Prince Bagration]. Описание войны России с Турцией 1806-1812 [Description of the war between Russia and Turkey 1806-1812] (in Russian). Vol. 2. St. Petersburg: Типография Балашева.
- Phillips, Charles; Axelrod, Alan, eds. (2005). Encyclopedia of Wars. New York City: Facts on File. ISBN 9780816028511.
- Scherbatov, Alexander (1888). Генерал-фельдмаршал Паскевич. Его жизнь и деятельность [Field Marshal Paskevich. His life and work] (in Russian). Vol. 1. St. Petersburg: Типография Голике.
- Tikhonov, Igor Sergeevich (2005). Багратион Петр Иванович [Bagration Pyotr Ivanovich]. Great Russian Encyclopedia (in Russian).
- Velichko, Konstantin; Novitsky, Vasily; Schwartz, Alexey von; Apushkin, Vladimir; Schoultz, Gustav von (1911). "Багратион, Петр Иванович, князь" [Pyotr Ivanovich Bagration, prince]. Sytin Military Encyclopedia (in Russian). Vol. 4: Порох – Бомба. St. Petersburg: Типография Т-ва И. Д. Сытина.
- Vengerov, S.; Voeikov, A.; Kareev, N. (1901). "Татарица" [Tataritsa]. Brockhaus and Efron Encyclopedic Dictionary (in Russian). Vol. 32: Тай – Термиты. St. Petersburg: Типография акц. общ. «Издательское дело, Брокгауз-Ефрон. p. 669.
