= Alexander Ivanovich Bagration =

Prince Alexander Ivanovich Bagration
- Prince of Mukhrani
- Born: 1771
- Died: 1820 (aged 48–49)
- Issue: Aleksandra (unknown); Pyotr (b. 1806); Nikoloz (b. 1808); Roman (b. 1809); Aleksandr (b. 1815)
- House: Bagrationi dynasty (House of Mukhrani)
- Father: Prince Ivane Bagration

Prince Alexander Ivanovich Bagration (Georgian: ალექსანდრე ივანეს ძე ბაგრატიონი) (1771-1820) was a Georgian royal prince (batonishvili) of House of Mukhrani of a collateral branch of the royal Bagrationi dynasty.

He was a son of Prince Ivane. His brothers Pyotr Bagration and Roman Bagration were famous generals of the Russian imperial army.

Alexander had 5 children:

- Aleksandra (unknown)
- Pyotr (born 1806)
- Nikoloz (born 1808)
- Roman (born 1809)
- Aleksandr (born 1815)
