= Roman Bagration =

Georgian noble and general (1778–1834)

Prince Roman Ivanovich Bagration
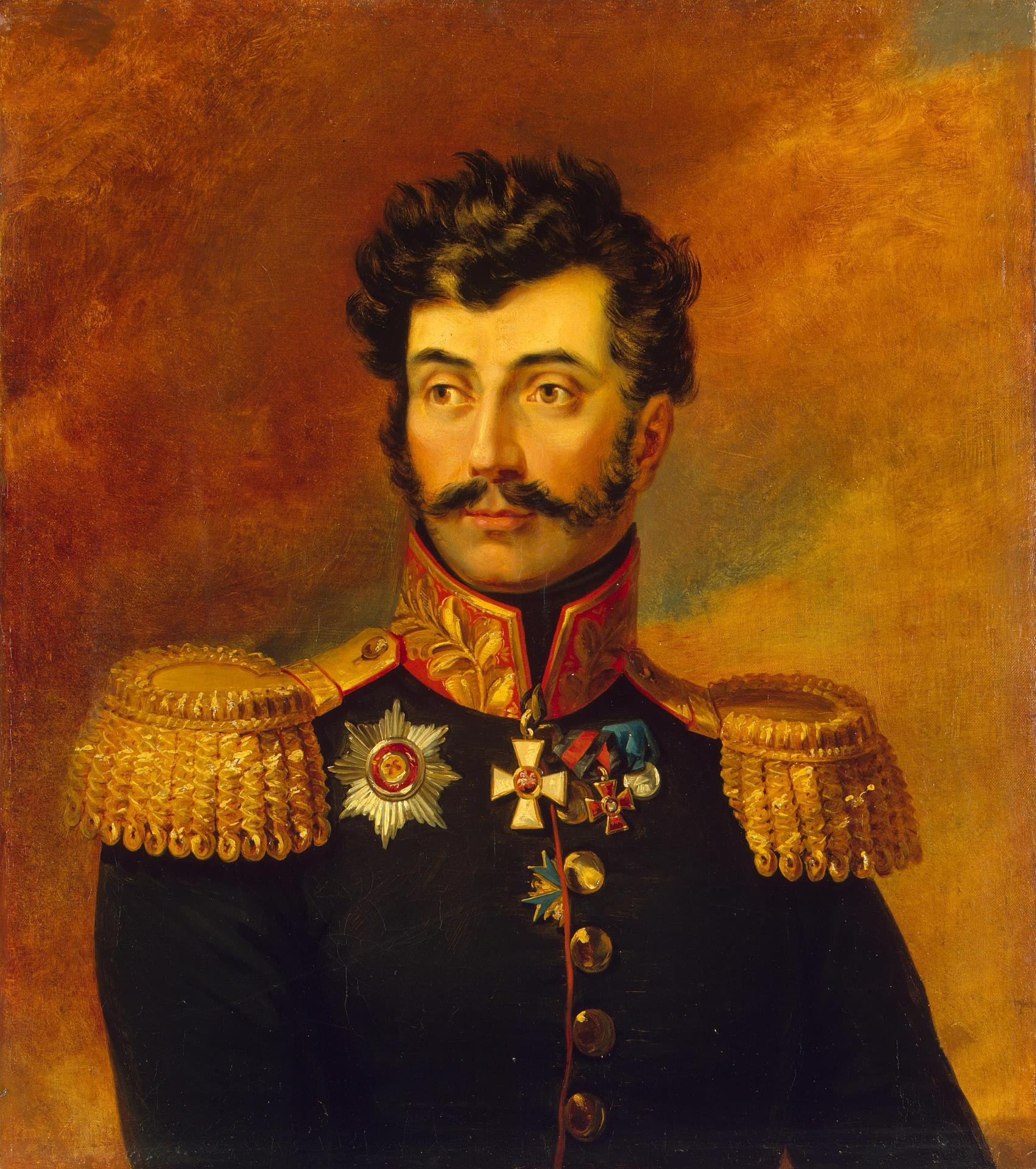
- Portrait of Bagration by George Dawe
- Born: 1778; Kizlyar, today Dagestan
- Died: 1834 (aged 55–56); Tiflis (now Tbilisi)
- Burial place: St. David Church, Tbilisi
- Spouse: Anna Ivanova
- Military career
- Allegiance: Russian Empire
- Branch: Imperial Russian Army
- Rank: Lieutenant general
- Unit: Russian Imperial Guard
- Conflicts: Persian Expedition of 1796; Capture of Derbent; Napoleonic Wars; War of the Third Coalition; Russo-Turkish War (1806–1812); Napoleon's invasion of Russia; Battle of Kobrin; Battle of Gorodechno; War of the Sixth Coalition; Siege of Bautzen; Siege of Dresden; Siege of Hamburg; Russo-Persian War (1826–1828); Capture of Erivan

Prince Roman (Revaz) Ivanovich Bagration (Russian: Роман (Реваз) Иванович Багратион, Georgian: რომან (რევაზ) ბაგრატიონი Roman (Revaz) Bagrat'ioni) (1778 – 1834) was a Georgian nobleman and a general in the Imperial Russian Army. A scion of the Georgian royal family Bagrationi, he was a brother of Pyotr Bagration, a notable Russian commander during the Napoleonic Wars.

He was the son of Prince Ivan Aleksandrovich Bagration.

== Career ==
Born in Kizlyar, Dagestan, Roman Bagration enrolled in the Chuguevsk Cossack regiment as an uryadnik (a Cossack NCO) at the age of 13 (1791). He saw his first action during the Persian Expedition of 1796 under Count Zubov and took part in the capture of Derbent. In 1802, he was commissioned in the Leib Guard Hussar regiment as a poruchik and fought against Napoleonic France during the 1805 War of the Third Coalition. At the request of his brother, Prince Bagration, he arrived, in 1806, in Georgia, to meet with a delegation of local nobility, which submitted him a petition expressing dissatisfaction with the Russian administration. Bagration was promptly recalled from Georgia, and sent to the army operating against the French in Prussia (1807).

From 1809 to 1810, he volunteered in the Danube Army and took part in the war against the Ottoman Empire, being promoted to colonel in 1810. During Napoleon's invasion of Russia (1812), he served in the 3rd Western Army and fought in the battles of Kobryn, Brest, and Gorodechno. For his valor in the Battle of Bautzen (1813), he received the rank of major general. He was then present at the sieges of Dresden, Hamburg, and Harburg (1813-1814).

In the 1820s, he served in the Caucasus and took part in the wars against Turkey and against Persia. He played a prominent role in the storming of Erivan, a Persian-held city of Armenia, in 1827 during the Russo-Persian War (1826-1828), and was elevated to the rank of lieutenant general in 1829. After the war, he settled in Tiflis where his mansion was frequented by the local elites and housed, in 1831, the first public performance of Woe from Wit, a play by Alexander Griboyedov, in which Bagration played the role of Colonel Skalozub.

In 1832, Bagration was sent to Abkhazia where he became ill of fever and died in Tiflis (1834). He is buried at St. David Church, Tbilisi, Georgia.

== Family ==
Prince Roman Bagration was married to Anna Semyonovna Ivanova (1799–1875). They had five children:

- Prince Pyotr (1818–1876), statesman, general and scientist.
- Prince Ivan (1824–1860).
- Princess Aleksandra (born 1829; died in infancy).
- Princess Anna
- Princess Elizaveta (was born in Izyum city, Ukraine on April 20, 1820, died 1867), married to General Baron Aleksandr Belendorf.
