= List of Peter Simple characters =

These are characters created by the columnist Peter Simple (1913–2006) from 1957 onwards. Some of his characters are based on real people and some real people seem to be based on his characters. A few of these links are noted.

== Major ==
- Julian Birdbath — perennially unsuccessful writer and "last citizen of the Republic of Letters". Performed astounding feat of literary detective-work by discovering a fourth Brontë sister, Doreen Brontë, and ghostwrote the autobiography of General "Tiger" Nidgett, but, as always, never received the recognition or payment he deserved. Finally retired to a disused lead mine in Derbyshire to work on a biography of Stephen Spender with only his pet toad, Amiel, for company. Mr Shuttleworth, a poultry farmer and part-time literary agent, is Birdbath's nearest neighbour, and sometimes relays items of literary news by shouting down the mineshaft.
- Trevor Dimwiddie — "underwater motorcycling ace" of varying age, appearance and origins. See also Sir Sid Ballpoint.
- Neville Dreadberg — avant-garde artist and self-publicist and husband of Pippa. Writer of the "classic documentary television plays" Serviettes of Death, Blood Orange and Monsters in Blue, dealing with crime, corruption and cannibalism amongst the white Rhodesians, Ulster Protestants and the British police, respectively. Anticipated Harold Pinter and Will Self.
- Mrs Dutt-Pauker — immensely rich and privileged Hampstead socialist, admirer of Stalin and rumoured lover of the East German communist leader Walter Ulbricht. She is the mother of Deirdre Dutt-Pauker, and the grandmother of the precociously bearded Maoist toddler and noted political theorist Bert Brecht Mao Rudy Che Odinga (or Mao Banana), and his sister Sus, "whose first thrilling cry as she entered the world, like Bert before her, was 'Boycott South African oranges!' " She employs the Albanian Maoist au pair girl Gjoq. Lives at a palatial Hampstead mansion called "Marxmount", but also owns a house called Leninmore in the west of Ireland, bought at the time of the Cuban Missile Crisis. Named after the communists Palme Dutt and Ana Pauker, she is based on leftist pundits such as the Toynbee family. She anticipated Margaret Hodge. The running joke of the character is that she is, in reality, a bourgeois snob, for example "many of her friends who felt deeply about the future of the world had pointed out that the white Rhodesians as a whole were not merely white and reactionary but rather common as well".
- Alderman Jabez Foodbotham — "the 25-stone, iron-watch-chained, crag-visaged, grim-booted" Lord Mayor of Bradford and "perpetual chairman of the Bradford City Tramways and Fine Arts Committee." Officially died in 1928 but local legend says that, like Charlemagne, he "lies asleep in a mountain cave near Northowram", waiting the summons "to save his city in its hour of supreme danger". Loosely inspired by the Chamberlain dynasty.
- Doreen Gaggs — trend-crazed tabloid and women's magazine journalist and wife of Jack Moron.
- Sir Jim Gastropodi — born in Poggibonsi, conductor of the Stretchford Municipal Symphony Orchestra and obsessive admirer of Mahler, newly discovered symphonies by whom, such as "The Interminable", "The Insufferable" and "The Unendurable", he insists on playing, to the disgust of Ron Spheroyd. Inspired by Sir John Barbirolli. Also from Poggibonsi are Giovanni Botulismo, proprietor of the popular Salmonella restaurant, and the late Giuseppe Fittopaldi, composer of the operas 'Le sorelle Brontë' , 'Bramwell' (sic), 'La Fanciulla del Riding Occidentale' , and 'Alderman Foodbotham di Bradford' , all to libretti by an unidentified author.
- J. Bonington Jagworth — leader of the militant Motorists' Liberation Front and defender of "the basic right of every motorist to drive as fast as he pleases, how he pleases and over what or whom he pleases". Suspicious of his Marxist chief-of-staff Royston Cylinder but good friend of Rev John Goodwheel. Anticipated Jeremy Clarkson by three decades.
- Dr Heinz Kiosk — A psychoanalyst and rentaquote pundit who, at every manifestation of anti-social behaviour, is ready to deflect responsibility from the individual perpetrator and onto society as a whole; as reflected in his catchphrase "We are all guilty!" Said to have anticipated Macpherson's finding of institutional racism.
- Jack Moron — tabloid journalist and husband of Doreen Gaggs. Writes aggressive articles demanding progress and change or warning of foreign peril.
- The Earl of Mountwarlock — the eight-foot, cyclops-eyed owner of the monster-infested Mountwarlock Estate near Stretchford. See also Phantomsby, Mr Dis, MacAnguish and Ghoulman.
- Lieutenant General Sir Frederick "Tiger" Nidgett — retired commanding officer of the Royal Army Tailoring Corps and maker of inspirational speeches full of fatuous rhetoric. His autobiography, Up Sticks and Away!, was ghostwritten by Julian Birdbath. Alleged mentor of Tony Blair.
- Harry and Janet Nodule — traffic-jam fans of Brassgrove Park in south London and always on the look out for a "good snarl-up".
- King Norman the Good — future head of the Royal Socialist Family. Husband of Queen Doreen, son-in-law of the Queen Gran, father of Princes Barry and Kevin and Princesses Shirley and Tracey, brother-in-law of Duke Len of Erdington. Foreshadows the "daylight on magic" media treatment of the Royal Family.
- Phantomsby — butler and factotum of the Earl of Mountwarlock and "one of the few practising werewolves left in the Midlands". Has a sharp-toothed but infectious smile.
- Albert Rasp — lethargic, goal-conceding goalkeeper of Stretchford United (home ground: Anthrax Park). Also a prestigious Stretchfordshire cricket all-rounder, he is known to have scored 1024 not out, in unexplained circumstances, in an innings composed entirely of sixes.
- Old Seth Roentgen — scientific farmer at the Ohm Farm who grows money and share-certificates directly from the soil and regularly disturbs or even kills his neighbours with agricultural experiments. Father of buxom, dark-eyed, lab-coated Hephzibah. Not to be confused with Old Seth the Wasp-Keeper.
- Dr Spacely-Trellis — progressive Bishop of Bevindon in the Stretchford Conurbation, where his domestic chaplain is the mischief-making Rev. Peter Nordwestdeutscher (a parody of Anglican peace activist Paul Oestreicher). He is almost always referred to as 'the go-ahead Bishop of Bevindon'. Anticipated and strongly resembles David Jenkins, Richard Harries, Rowan Williams and many other Anglican clerics.
- Sir Herbert Trance — head of the British Boring Board of Control based at Lethargy House. World-famous bores competing in competitions organized by the BBBC (and chronicled by Narcolept) include Antonin Bvorak from Czechoslovakia, Jean-Pierre Cafard from Canada, Grant Coma Jr from America, Shloime ben Chloroform from Israel (aka "Glorious Shloime"), R.S. Nattacharya from India and Ron Stupor from Australia.
- 'Wayfarer' — expert on London byways. Continually discovering lost communities of Anglo-Saxon washerwomen, whirling dervishes, Incas, Mongols, et al. visited in their time by authorities such as Samuel Johnson and Thomas Carlyle but now usually reduced to one aged representative living in reduced circumstances "behind an ordinary-looking pet shop in South London's Turgis Hill High Street".

== Minor ==
- Prem Bakshi — Diminutive Pakistani triangle player in the Stretchford M.S.O.
- Sir Sid Ballpoint — "Supreme Manager-in-Chief of the British Underwater Motorcycling Federation". See also Trevor Dimwiddie.
- S. J. Barstow (1886–1929), the only hydro-electrical engineer to be a member of the Bloomsbury Group. Took part with D. H. Lawrence at a combined poetry-reading and hydro-electrical engineering demonstration in Oxford, where he was introduced to Lady Ottoline Morrell. His letters to Leonard Woolf requesting payment for repairs to a table lamp are profoundly moving and foreshadow his later suicide by auto-electrocution.
- Blazeaway — column's shooting correspondent. Lists bags of left-wing student, ecologist and social scientist, some of whom end up on the tables at the trendy West End restaurant Au Petit Coin Anthropophage.
- Boggs Motor Company — columnnar vehicle manufacturer. Product line includes such cars as the Boggs Assassin, Boggs Yobbo, Boggs Super-Oaf and (the vehicle of choice for Harry and Janet Nodule) the Boggs Snail.
- Dr Kev Burst — headmaster of Stretchford Comprehensive School. Runs extensive car-hire, pornography and other businesses with the labour and cash he extracts from his huge student community.
- E. S. Canister (1886–1980) — litterateur (as in litter) who was "the first to leave a rusting bedstead on the summit of Scafell Pike". His later works include "Vandalised Grand Piano and Two Tons of Toffee Papers on Ben Nevis" (1920) and "Four Tons of Miscellaneous Litter on the Sierra Nevada" (1927). Inspiration for the Friends of Litter.
- Jeremy Cardhouse — originally a "progressive" Conservative Party MP, later defected to the Labour Party and became a Peter Mandelson-worshipping Euro MP. Compared by A. N. Wilson to the eventual Conservative leader and Prime Minister David Cameron.
- Dr Abdul Ngong Castrumba — "freelance, all-purpose revolutionary leader". Based on Fidel Castro, Patrice Lumumba and other 1960s revolutionaries.
- Chocolate Meringue Narthex — A highly successful rock group led by the Bishop of Bevindon. Anticipated the Rt. Rev. Andrew Rumsey, Bishop of St. Albans.
- Mungo Clange — Sentimental and optimistic columnist who shares his 'tidings of joy' with readers. Specialises in mawkish stories about lovable ordinary folk, and in sharing the simple joy of the elderly mothers of such characters as Leonid Brezhnev and Ayatollah Khomenei. Modelled on Godfrey Winn.
- Attila Craggs — ruthlessly resolute chief of the Television Licence Evaders' Liberation Army, or TELELA. Oversees his fanatical Telelistas from a secret hideout "somewhere in South London" and speaks a special and sometimes confusing dialect of commercial Spanish.
- Royston Cylinder — ambitious crypto-Marxist chief-of-staff of J. Bonington Jagworth, leader of the Motorists' Liberation Front. Possibly anticipates Alexei Sayle's attempt to take over Top Gear, but it is difficult to tell when Sayle should be taken seriously.
- Mr Dis — taciturn, dark-visaged manager of the Home Farm on the Mountwarlock Estate. Expert in the growing of mandrakes.
- Senator Patrick Flannely — keen American supporter of the Irish Republican Navy (IRN) - a parody of prominent American sympathizers with the Irish Republican Army such as Senator Edward Kennedy.
- Ron Frabb — teen idol kept permanently drugged by his manager Cliff Rampton.
- Dr F. Gestaltvogel — Chief Consultant Psychiatrist at Nerdley General Hospital. Often gives expert advice in court cases overseen by Dr Ellis Goth-Jones, recommending abreactive therapy or electroshock therapy for the accused and offering euthanasia at his own clinic if this fails.
- Ghoulman — chief warden of the safari park on the Mountwarlock estate, where he cares for the wyverns, basilisks, gorgons and other monsters and ensures that their incineratory or petrifactory powers are always working at their peak.
- Gjoq — Albanian au pair of Mrs Dutt-Pauker. Forms a sometimes fractious anti-Stalinist alliance with Mrs Dutt-Pauker's Maoist grandson Bert.
- Jon Glasse-Derkeley — arts critic and "cultural entrepreneur". Chronicler of the Nerdley Scene during the 1960s.
- Len Gollip — General Secretary of the Associated Union of Hole-borers. Presides over record votes of up to 2,379,801 in union ballots, despite the Union having only 65,785 members, many now dead. May refer to the 1959 Electrical Trades Union ballot dispute.
- Rev John Goodwheel — the "Apostle of the Motorways"; a good friend of J. Bonington Jagworth, he is "the motorists' padre" . Drives a mobile Romanesque cathedral.
- Goth-Joneses — nepotistic family in the Stretchford conurbation. Llewellyn Goth-Jones is a fanatic advocate of contraception, abortion and "universal sexual intercourse". Sir Aylwin Goth-Jones is "the genial, unpopular Chief Constable of Stretchford", fanatically devoted to the detection and arrest of drink drivers. Dr Ellis Goth-Jones, 59, is the chairman of Nerdley magistrates' court, overseeing cases initiated by Detective Sergeant J. B. MacKenzie of Nerdley Special Branch and receiving the expert advice of Dr F. Gestaltvogel. Dr Harry Goth-Jones is the vice-chancellor of St Oicks University in Stretchford, where "more than 105 per cent of entrants achieved honours degrees mostly in such subjects as skateboarding studies and Belgian pastry studies".
- Angelo "Tiny Tim" Grotto — weedy, sickly, near-dwarvish Mafia Boss. Wore an "outsize, steel-lined" fedora from beneath which his weak, watery eyes "missed everything". Feared by rival Mafia bosses Giovanni "Fat Face" Leoncavallo, Michele "Six Legs" Puccini, and Giacomo "Plastic Garden Gnome" Wolf-Ferrari. Was eventually slain by Francesco "Big Jock" Busoni with a poisoned 4-lb tin of his favourite sweets, Uncle Joe's Mintballs from Wigan, after a failed assassination attempt with an explosive teddy bear.
- Mr Grylls — former clergyman and authority on ecclesiastical law, now attends to Ughtred St John Mainwaring, the column's well-bred computer. Wears special uniform and forswears animal food while in attendance.
- Squire Haggard — hard-drinking, xenophobic and lecherous 18th-century squire and diarist, invented and written for the column by the humorist Michael Green. Always armed with a fowling-piece, he is the perpetual foe of "Whigs, Jacobites, Papists, Frenchmen and Scotchmen". Has a butler named Grind. Later portrayed in a Yorkshire Television / ITV series by Keith Barron.
- Mr. Harrison; kindly old shop steward at the panel-beating plant of the Boggs motor factory in Nerdley, where he supervises the three chums Jim, Fred and Rashid Patel.
- Supt. J.S. Harrogate — chief of police operations against the deadly Housewives' Clubs of the Stretchford conurbation. Is believed to write the anonymous preface to the Annual Directory of Typical Housewives' Fan Clubs of Stretchford (Viper and Bugloss).
- Rex Hickfield — journalist who describes visits to the ageing Oliver and Connie Mellors (née Chatterley), formerly of D. H. Lawrence's Lady Chatterley's Lover.
- Brian Hohenzollern — brilliant film director at Piledriver Films (cf. Hammer Films) whose series of horror movies star Bruce Braganza as Ludwig Wittgenstein, with co-stars Stan Bourbon Parma, Kay Wittelsbach and Ted Capet, costume research by Shirley Porphyrogenitus and music by Bing Karageorgevitch.
- Housewives' Fan Clubs — fanatical, schismatic and constantly battling fan clubs in the Stretchford conurbation. All are descended from the Our Jackie Kennedy fan club of the 1960s. Police operations against them are overseen by Supt. J.S. Harrogate.
- Clare Howitzer — socialist agony aunt. Based partly on Claire Rayner.
- Morag Ironheart — famous for her Clackmannanshire terriers, bred at her kennels at Brig O' Dread in their eponymous county.
- MacAnguish — Scottish head gardener on the Mountwarlock estate. In charge of the Great Garden of Terror and the Deadly Upas Tree. Presumably inspired by Angus McAllister, the Scottish gardener to the Earl of Emsworth in the 'Blandings' novels by P. G. Wodehouse.
- Detective Sergeant J. B. MacKenzie — star officer of Nerdley Special Branch who is continually making arrests on Kandahar Road while on "routine search for certain substances". See also Dr Ellis Goth-Jones.
- Ughtred St John Mainwaring — column's well-bred computer. Has "carved mahogany case" and "subdued lighting as of finest wax candles". Easily angered by breaches of etiquette and protocol. Attended by the devoted Mr Grylls.
- The Master of Paddington — the name given by Peter Simple to the author of the (genuine) graffito "Far away is close at hand in images of elsewhere", which appeared on a wall close to Paddington Station.
- Dr E. J. Multimer — angry young astronomer and sex-pest at Stretchford. Based partly on Fred Hoyle.
- Elvira Mutcliffe — "Cleckheaton-born diseuse and devotee of solid pottery and eurhythmic dancing" who leads a well-respected witches' coven in the West Riding. On good terms with Satan, who often appears to her coven in the form of the Great Black Goat of Mytholmroyd, and guardian, with her chief warlock, Councillor Albert Gogden, of the Trilby Hat of Invisibility.
- Narcolept — column's boring correspondent. Reports tournaments organized by the British Boring Board of Control under Sir Herbert Trance.
- Rev Bruce Nethers — Vandals' Padre and incumbent at St Atilla's church. See Supergoth.
- Dr. Ngrafta — president of Gombola (formerly Gomboland, capital New Harrogate) and the only African head of state who is both a witchdoctor and a graduate of the London School of Economics. Possibly intended as an exaggerated reference to Jomo Kenyatta, who studied at the LSE and, as a child, had "assisted [his grandfather] in his role as a traditional healer".
- Rev. Peter Nordwestdeutscher — mischief-making domestic chaplain of Dr Spaceley-Trellis, the go-ahead Bishop of Bevindon. Name clearly inspired by Canon Paul Oestreicher, 'veteran peace campaigner' and the sometime amanuensis of Bertrand Russell.
- Marylou Ogreburg — born in Dissentville, Ohio, now runs the "People's Bread and Marmite Street Dance Theatre Workshop" in London, giving politically awakening and socially relevant performances for ordinary folk unable to escape in time.
- Paul Ohm — "freelance technologist" who lives at Atomdene, Edgbaston and is building a nuclear accelerator in his garden.
- Gillian Paste — left-wing television producer and presenter of Sneer with Mother (cf Listen with Mother). Close ally of Mrs Dutt-Pauker.
- Cliff Rampton — pop music entrepreneur and manager of Ron Frabb.
- Redshank — the column's nature diarist (parodying the Country Diary in The Guardian and similar features in other newspapers). Chronicled the oddly incompetent bird the Dotterel and the doings of such characters as Old Seth the Wasp-Keeper.
- Rentamob (originally Rentacrowd) — mammoth consortium supplying semi-automated, slogan-shouting demonstrators wherever they are required. Was particularly in demand during the Apartheid era.
- Old Seth the Wasp-Keeper — preserver of the custom of "telling the wasps" (cf Telling the bees), whereby his charges are kept informed of "actual and grievous bodily harm, rape, fraud and the formation of new gangs of hooligans of ever-increasing ferocity" in his village. Author of Through A Waspkeeper's Window, Waspkeeping My Destiny and A Waspkeeper Remembers. Chronicled by the column's nature diarist Redshank.
- Peter Simple himself — benevolent landowner and upholder of the traditions of England. Family seat: Simpleham. Wealth: substantial but not excessive, deriving in part from slave labour on South American latifundia. A regular reader of the Feudal Times and Reactionary Herald, from whose thoughtful leaders he frequently quotes. Protected by two giant bodyguards, Blohm and Voss (named after the Blohm and Voss company).
- Ken Slabb — "bearded, grenade-draped" perpetual president of Stretchford Student Union.
- Len Spheroyd (1920–1976) — fattest fireman in history, at over thirty-two stone, and distant relation of Ron Spheroyd. Regularly late on duty due to non-stop eating of pork pies and carrying of other emergency rations, and found it very difficult to travel to the scene of a fire. Eventually achieved his dearest wish and extinguished a fire when he sat on his own dangerously burning chip pan, but ruined chips and lost his own life.
- Ron Spheroyd — tuba player and shop steward in the Stretchford M.S.O. under Sir Jim Gastropodi. Plays a fortissimo bottom B flat, signalling "All out", when a newly discovered Mahler symphony ("The Interminable" or "The Unendurable") has gone on for more than two hours. A soul-mate of militant British unionists of the 1970s and 1980s such as Mick McGahey and distant relation of Len Spheroyd, the world's fattest fireman.
- River Stretch — chemical-vapour-wreathed river believed to be "the most polluted" in Europe. See Stretchford.
- Stretchford — principal city of the Stretchford Conurbation. Famous, inter alia, for "lovely, sex-maniac-haunted" Sadcake Park, with its own council-employed naked sadhu, a permanently ineffectual football team, Stretchford United, and a vast network of fanatical, ever-battling Housewives' Clubs. Possibly from Stechford, a genuine area of Birmingham once represented in Parliament by Roy Jenkins, a figurehead of the political ideas that Wharton despised.
- Supergoth — column's vandalism correspondent. Covered the Stretchford Vandals' League and the exciting battle for league and cup glory between such teams as the Bog Lane Wanderers, the Soup Hales Iconoclasts and the Lampton Huns.
- Major E.J. Tannoy — "chief roarsman" of the Friends of Noise based at Pandemonium House.
- Royston Vibes — 18th-year sociology student at Nerdley University. Claims to be head of an Aztec community that conquered Nerdley in the Dark Ages and demands ever-increasing concessions and benefits from local government, including the inalienable right to commit human sacrifice on subsidized step pyramids.
- R. S. Viswaswami — naked Indian hermit, or sadhu, employed by the council to live on a lake in "lovely, sex-maniac haunted Sadcake Park", the famed "iron lung" of the Stretchford conurbation.
- Viper & Bugloss — publishing house, possibly based on Hodder & Stoughton.
