= Kumayama ruins =

Asuka period temple ruins in Okayama, Japan

- 熊山遺跡 (Japanese)
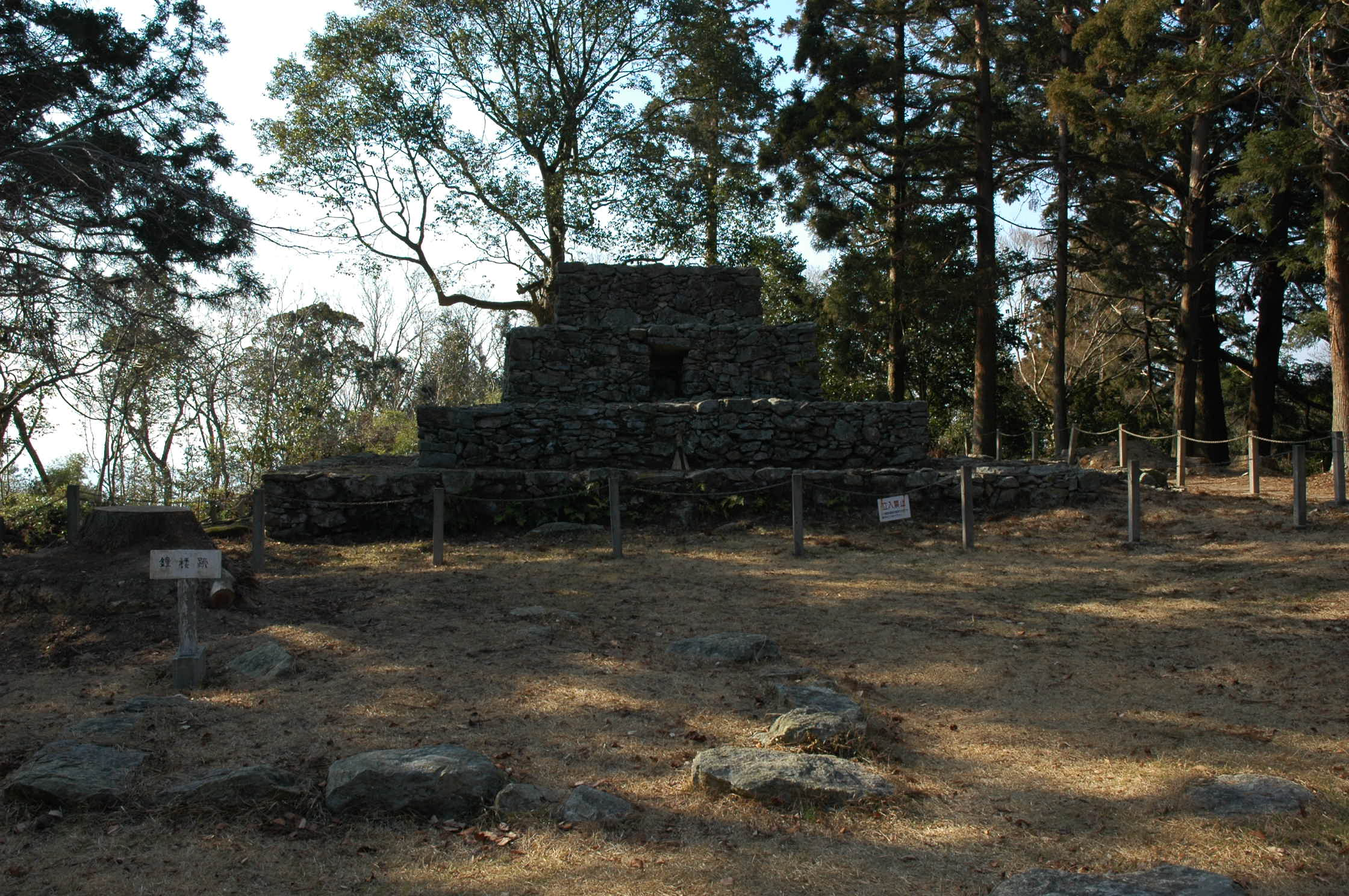
- Kumayama ruins

- Kumayama ruins Kumayama ruins (Japan)
- Interactive map of Kumayama ruins
- 34°45′13.85″N 134°7′15.5″E
- Type: temple ruin
- Periods: c.early Nara period
- Location: Akaiwa, Okayama, Japan
- Region: San'yō region

History
- Built: c.7th century

Site notes
- Public access: Yes (no facilities)

The Kumayama ruins (熊山遺跡, Kumayama iseki) is a presumed Buddhist temple ruin located on Mount Kumayama of what is now the city of Akaiwa, Okayama, in the San'yō region of Japan. It consists of a stone stepped pyramid of unknown date and origin, and was designated as a National Historic Site in 1956.

== History ==
The Kumayama ruins is a rhyolite masonry structure consisting of a base and a three-tiered platform near the summit of 508-meter Mount Kumayama, which has been regarded as a holy mountain since ancient times. The structure is thought to have been built in the early Nara period; however, it is believed to have been built on top of an iwakura, or sacred site where religious rituals have been held since the Yayoi period. The base is a square pedestal, approximately 11.7 meters on each side. The first tier is 7.7 meters square and 1 meter in height, the second tier is 5.2 meters square and 1.2 meters in height and the third tier is 3.5 meters square and 1.2 meters in height. On the second tier are square horizontal niches on four sides, which are thought to be shrines in which Buddha statues or other objects were placed. These lateral holes are 65–90 cm high, 62–73 cm wide, and 90–136 cm deep and are located in the center of each of the four sides. In the center of the top tier is a stone chamber in which a 162-centimeter-high five-tiered ceramic cylinder was placed. The cylindrical container is now stored at Tenri University in Tenri, Nara. Within the cylinder was a small sancai pot containing a leather scroll with an inscription, but this was stolen in 1937 and no details were recorded.

There are various theories as to the origin and purpose of this structure. It is similar to the Zutō in Nara and the Dotō in Sakai, Osaka, both of which are Asuka or early Nara period Buddhist stupas built in the form of a stepped pyramid, and local legend attributes this structure to the Tang priest Ganjin, who founded the Nara temple of Tōshōdai-ji. Other theories have been that it was a tomb, ordination platform for Buddhist priests, or a sutra mound.

Historical records indicate that a temple called Ryōzen-ji (which claimed to have been founded by Ganjin) existed in the near vicinity of this relic until the early Muromachi period, and the remains of foundations for similar masonry structures of 32 different sizes have been confirmed scattered at an elevation of 350 meters at various locations on the slopes of Mount Kumayama. The Kumayama site is about 30 minutes by car from JR West Kumayama Station.

== In Oomoto ==
The Kumayama ruins are considered to be a sacred site in Oomoto, a Japanese new religion. Onisaburo Deguchi, the founder of the Oomoto religion, considers the site to be the tomb of Susanoo. It is mentioned in the Moon Mirror (月鏡, Tsukikagami), one of the scriptures of the Oomoto religion that was written by Deguchi. Onisaburo Deguchi also visited the Kumayama ruins in 1930.

== See also ==
- List of Historic Sites of Japan (Okayama)
- Dotō in Osaka
- Zutō in Nara
