= Michael Green (humorist) =

British journalist and author of humorous books

Michael Green (born 2 January 1927 in Leicester, England, died 25 February 2018) was a British journalist and author of humorous books. He is best known for The Art of Coarse Rugby, The Art of Coarse Acting and other books with similar titles.

== Career ==
Green began his career as a junior journalist on the Leicester Mercury. He later joined the Northampton Chronicle and Echo, where he worked on both the sporting and theatrical fronts, then the Birmingham Gazette as a sub-editor. Later he was a sports writer on The Observer and a contributor to the Sunday Times, among others.

The Art of Coarse Rugby, which became a best-seller in 1960, and The Art of Coarse Acting were both products of his Midlands days, when he was involved with amateur rugby and dramatics. Green was commissioned to write The Art of Coarse Rugby by Hutchinson, to go with a republication of The Art of Coarse Cricket by Spike Hughes, who had intended the title as a play on Coarse Fishing. Green describes a coarse actor as "one who can remember his lines, but not the order in which they come. One who performs ... amid lethal props..." and goes on: "The Coarse Actor's aim is to upstage the rest of the cast. His hope is to be dead by Act Two so that he can spend the rest of his time in the bar. His problems? Everyone else connected with the production." In similar vein, the coarse rugby player is described as differentiated from the rugger player in that he does not enjoy playing, but instead plays for any one of a number of other reasons, such as to get away from his wife, or because he dare not admit he is too old. Other books in the series followed, and The Art of Coarse Moving subsequently became the 1977 BBC TV series A Roof over My Head with Brian Rix.

His book about journalism, Don't Print My Name Upside Down, was based largely on his Northampton days. Stanley Worker, the paper's long-serving chief sub-editor, was so proud of references to him in the book that he kept a copy in his desk drawer to peruse with quiet satisfaction during rare lulls in his working day. Green also published two autobiographical books: The Boy Who Shot Down an Airship, which includes reminiscences about his National Service experiences, and Nobody Hurt in Small Earthquake, about his postwar journalist and sub-editor experiences in Northampton, Birmingham and London.

He also created and wrote the character of Squire Haggard for a newspaper column written by Peter Simple, subsequently a novel and the Haggard TV series 1990–92 on ITV. He created three Coarse Acting Shows, two of which were performed at the Edinburgh Festival in 1977 and 1979; these are essentially a series of sketches about bad acting. Tonight Josephine is a book of amusing imaginary letters written by historical figures.

Green was famous for his zany and slightly eccentric behaviour. Members of the Masque Theatre in Northampton were able to recall Green's antics in minute detail many years (decades?) after his departure, and the Northampton Chronicle office was awash with Green stories, all on the theme of good intentions leading to all-round chaos. At the Leicester Mercury he was firewatching one night with Maurice Barsby. Maurice said when looking at the huge printing presses in the basement "I know how these things work …” Michael said "Go on, then". He pulled the main switches and Maurice pressed the button. The press started but not gradually, and the enormous reel of paper broke and spewed into the machine-room. So there was no midnight edition of the Mercury, and as the presses did not stop when the button was pressed they had to switch off at the mains. Next day Michael was questioned and then sacked, but not Maurice. Green admits that he "had a reputation for playing the fool." The overnight firewatching job was unpopular, except with lads of 16 or 17 who were too young to be called up; they could drink brown ale, use the typewriters and telephones and smoke the editor's cigars (leaving burns in the carpet).

== See also ==
- The Questors Theatre, Ealing where he has links

== Works ==
=== Autobiography ===
- The Boy Who Shot Down an Airship Heinemann, London, 1988, ISBN 0-434-30412-3
- Nobody Hurt in Small Earthquake Heinemann, London, 1990, ISBN 0-434-30410-7

=== The 'Coarse' Series ===
- The Art of Coarse Rugby, Hutchinson, London, 1960
- The Art of Coarse Sailing, Hutchinson, London, 1962
- Even Coarser Rugby, or what did you do to Ronald?, Hutchinson, London, 1963
- The Art of Coarse Acting, or how to wreck an amateur dramatic society, Hutchinson, London, 1964
- The Art of Coarse Sport, Hutchinson, London, 1965
- The Art of Coarse Golf, Hutchinson, London, 1968
- The Art of Coarse Moving, Hutchinson, London, 1969
- The Art of Coarse Drinking, Hutchinson, London, 1973
- The Art of Coarse Cruising, Hutchinson, London, 1976
- Even Coarser Sport, Hutchinson, London, 1978
- The Art of Coarse Sex, Hutchinson, London, 1980
- The Art of Coarse Office Life, or 'He's just popped out' , Hutchinson, London, 1985

=== Novels ===
- Don’t Print My Name Upside Down, Hutchinson, London, 1963 (about newspapers)
- Squire Haggard’s Journal, Hutchinson, 1975

=== Plays ===
- Four Plays for Coarse Actors, Samuel French, 1978
- The Coarse Acting Show Two, Samuel French, 1980
- The Third Great Coarse Acting Show, Samuel French, 1985
- Coarse Acting Strikes Back, Samuel French, 2011

=== Others ===
- Tonight, Josephine, Secker and Warburg, 1981
- Don’t Swing from the Balcony, Romeo, Secker and Warburg, 1983
- Rugby Alphabet, Pelham, 1971
- Stage Noises and Effects, Herbert Jenkins, 1958 (a handbook)
