= Albany Theatre (Coventry) =

Multi-purpose arts centre in Coventry, West Midlands, England

The Albany Theatre
- Butts Theatre
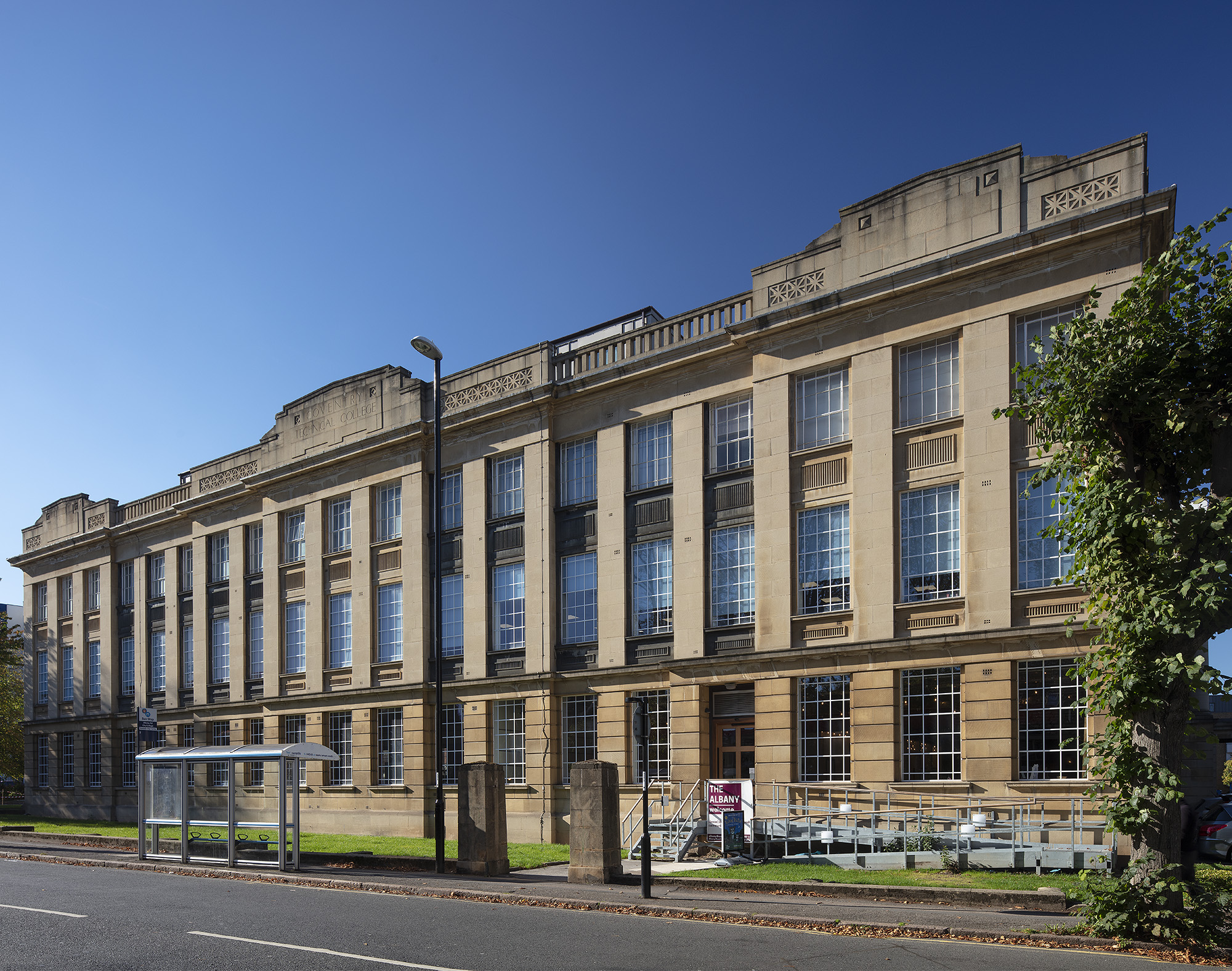
- Exterior of the Albany Theatre
- Interactive map of The Albany Theatre
- Location: Coventry; West Midlands, CV1; United Kingdom
- Coordinates: 52.405°N 1.5238°W
- Capacity: 620

Website
- http://www.albanytheatre.co.uk

The Albany Theatre is a multi-purpose arts centre in Coventry, West Midlands. It puts on a wide variety of shows including music, comedy, drama and family shows both in its auditorium and two studio theatres.

The theatre was originally built in 1935 as a lecture hall at the City College before becoming a theatre after the Second World War, home to the Midlands Theatre Company who later founded the Belgrade Theatre. After the college moved across the city, the theatre was closed in 2008, but the council intervened - requiring the theatre to be reopened which it did on February 1, 2013, as the newly named Albany Theatre.

The theatre is a charity and is run by a board of volunteer trustees with a small team of paid staff along with a growing team of volunteers. Its current theatre director is playwright Alan Pollock.

Facilities include an art-deco style theatre, seating up to 620 people and following extensive renovations in 2023–24, now includes two studio theatres, a large foyer and two multi-use community spaces.

== History ==
The building that is the Albany Theatre main house was originally built and used as a lecture theatre. Called the Great Hall, it sat at the heart of Coventry Technical College, and was opened in 1935, when the college moved from its previous home of Earl Street to the corner of Albany Road and the Butts.

During the Second World War, the college never closed and after the heavy bombing in November 1940, hundreds of homeless citizens were housed at the college. A number of bombs were dropped on the building, but it escaped with little damage.

The Council for the Encouragement of Music and the Arts began to use the hall as a theatre through the War Years to entertain the public with concerts and other events.

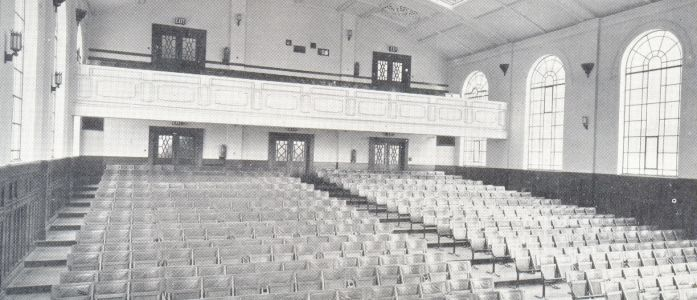
The auditorium when in use as a lecture theatre

After the war, the college or Butts Theatre, as it had become known, entered something of a golden age being used both by community groups, but also as a professional venue. It was home to the Midland Theatre Company – the first funded (and well-supported) "Rep".

Workers at car factories like Morris Motors organised amateur play performances; arts societies organised drama competitions; musical theatre societies thrived; dance companies and schools used it well, as did of course students studying at the college. The theatre is mentioned in "The Art of Coarse Acting" from when it was home to several drama festivals.

The theatre underwent major refurbishment in the late 1980s with the construction of a counterweight flying frame and powered flying winches as well as a major electrical rewire of the stage lighting, financed by Coventry City Council. But then the future of the building as a theatre came under significant threat during the 1990s.

As Carol Bloxham notes, in her 2008 history of the college, the Technical College faced acute financial pressures, attributed to the inability of College Management to manage the budget that was handed to them when colleges were taken out of local authority control. When in 1991 it came to light that the Technical College had lost somewhere in the region of £3 million in its accounts, the Principal, John Temple, resigned along with members of the senior management team. Keith Wood, then Theatre Manager, fought a determined battle, strongly supported by local amateur groups, to prevent the theatre from being converted to house computer suites. Although Arts Council England awarded a substantial lottery grant in 1997 (£365,000) for the "Refurbishment of Community Theatre" the threat to the theatre's survival was constant.

The passion of the campaign to save it, led by Alan Biddle and Coventry Musical Theatre Consortium, persuaded the City Council to impose a "Section 106" planning condition when the college building was finally sold to developers that aimed to ensure the theatre would be saved for the community. When Coventry Technical College moved its final students across the city at the end of 2008 the theatre closed.

The S106 required the site's new owners to establish "the Butts Theatre Trust" (a charitable trust that would operate the re-opened Theatre) "as soon as is reasonably practical" following the appointment of a "Theatre Development Manager".

Once established, the Trust set about bringing the theatre building back to life. Allowed access in June 2012, a small army of volunteers planned and carried out restitution, repairs and developments. An estimated £100,000 of time and donated materials, supported by residual grant funding of around £50,000 from Coventry City Council, led to a formal re-opening of the auditorium on 1 February 2013.

== Present Day ==
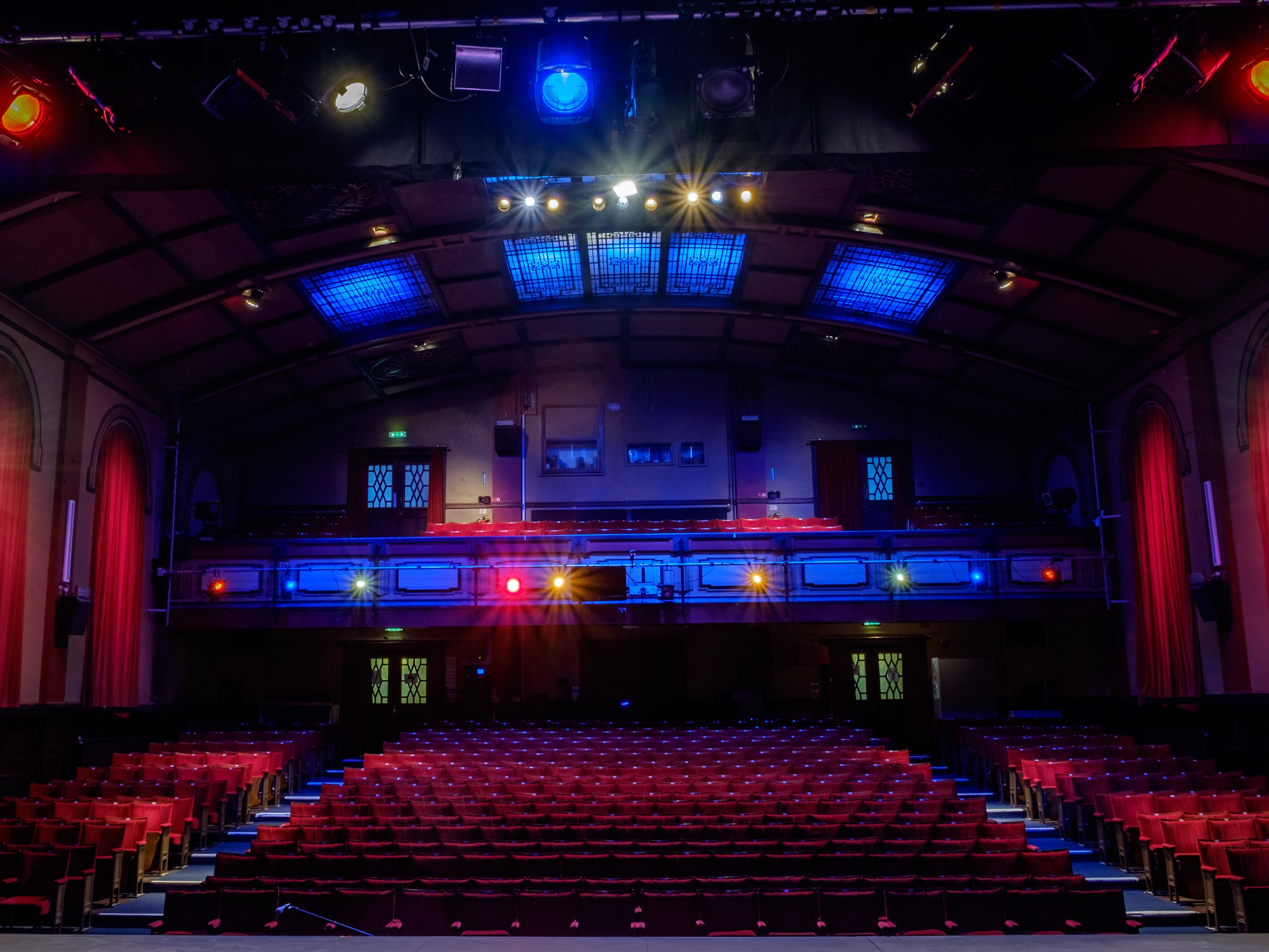
The auditorium of the Albany Theatre

The Albany Theatre is a registered charity and is run by a board of trustees, the Albany Theatre Trust. The theatre's vision is to 'promote well-being through arts for life'. The theatre supports many community groups and initiatives and frequently welcomes local theatre and dance groups onto its stage. It is home to various community groups such as local dance troupe Ascension, the Albany Sings Choir and folk collective CVFolk as well as its own Youth Theatre.

Primarily bringing in shows from other production companies, in 2017 the theatre put on its first in-house production and has since produced a professional in-house production each Christmas, as well as an in-house community pantomime.

In 2023, following a £3 million redevelopment, funded in part by Coventry City of Culture, the original art deco auditorium was joined by two studio theatres, two multi-use participatory spaces, new toilets and a new café/bar. The theatre was officially re-opened by Lord Mayor Mal Mutton in October 2024 with a launch event.

The theatre was helmed by CEO and Artistic Director Kevin Shaw from 2020 - 2025, and by Alan Pollock from 2025 - Present, and has a small team of 13 paid staff.
