= Zutō =

Nara period Buddhist temple in Nara, Japan

- 頭塔 (Japanese)
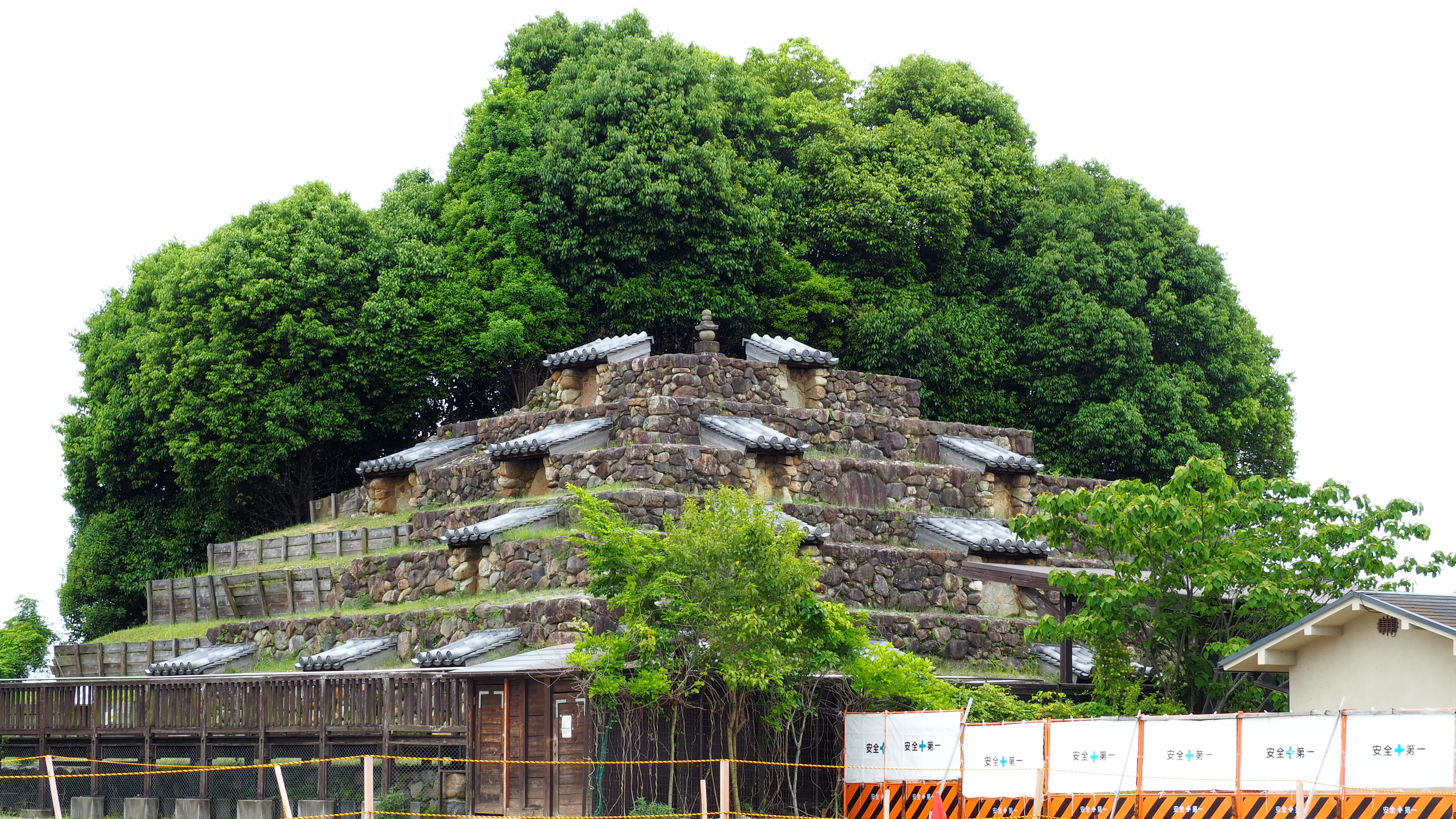
- Zutō

- Zutō Zutō (Japan)
- Interactive map of Zutō
- 34°40′37.9″N 135°50′19.8″E
- Type: temple ruins
- Periods: Nara period
- Location: Nara, Nara, Japan
- Region: Kansai region

History
- Built: 8th century AD

Site notes
- Public access: Yes

The Zutō (頭塔, head stupa), is a Nara period Buddhist relic located in the Takabatake neighborhood of Nara, Nara Prefecture, Japan. It was designated as a National Historic Site in 1953, with the area under protection expanded in 1922. It is an earthen step pyramid with seven square steps with stone images of Buddha on all four sides, and a total height of ten meters.

== Overview ==
According to the Tōdaiji Yōroku (東大寺要録), the monument was constructed in 767 by the monk Jitchū, based on Indian models, and was originally referred to as the "dōtō" (earthen tower). However, this history was forgotten by the Heian period and the monument was incorporated into a sub-temple of Kofuku-ji dedicated to the monk Genbō. The Heian period book Shichidaiji Junrei Shiki (七大寺巡礼私記, Pilgrimage to the Seven Great Temples) by Ōe Chikamichi (published in 1140) asserted that it was the tomb of Genbō's head. This legend spread widely, and the name of the monument was corrupted to Zutō.

The monument is an earthen stupa, consisting of a square earthen platform made of tamped earth, with a base measuring 32 meters on each side and 1.2 meters high. The platform shrinks by three meters on each stage, with the top platform measuring 6.2 meters on each side. The odd-numbered platforms are 1.1 meters high, the even-numbered platforms 0.6 meters high, and the height from the base to the top platform is about 10 meters. Stone Buddha statues in bas relief (some with line carvings) are placed on each tier. Thirteen of the stone Buddha statues that were originally exposed were designated as National Important Cultural Properties in 1977, and nine of the 14 stone Buddha statues found in subsequent archaeological excavations were additionally designated in 2002. It is estimated that a total of 44 stone Buddha statues were originally installed, 11 on each of the four sides. Some of the statues retain traces of paint. The stone Buddha statues on the east, west, and north sides were restored and placed in roofed niches, but the stone Buddha statue on the south side was placed directly on the ground.

After the excavation by the Nara National Research Institute for Cultural Properties ended in 1986, the northern half was restored and preserved, while the southern half was left as it was before the excavation. The excavation revealed that the current structure was built on top of an earlier three-tier structure. Documentation subsequently found in the archives of the Shōsōin confirmed that an unknown person built this previous structure in 760 by extensively remodeling a 6th century kofun burial mound. Jitchū dismantled and completely rebuilt the structure as part of a project to develop the hill south of the original Tōdai-ji precincts.

The monument is 1.5 kilometers due south of Tōdai-ji's Nandaimon gate and 1.7 kilometers southeast of Kintetsu Nara Station.

A structure similar to theZutō is the Dotō in the city of Sakai, Osaka.

== Gallery ==
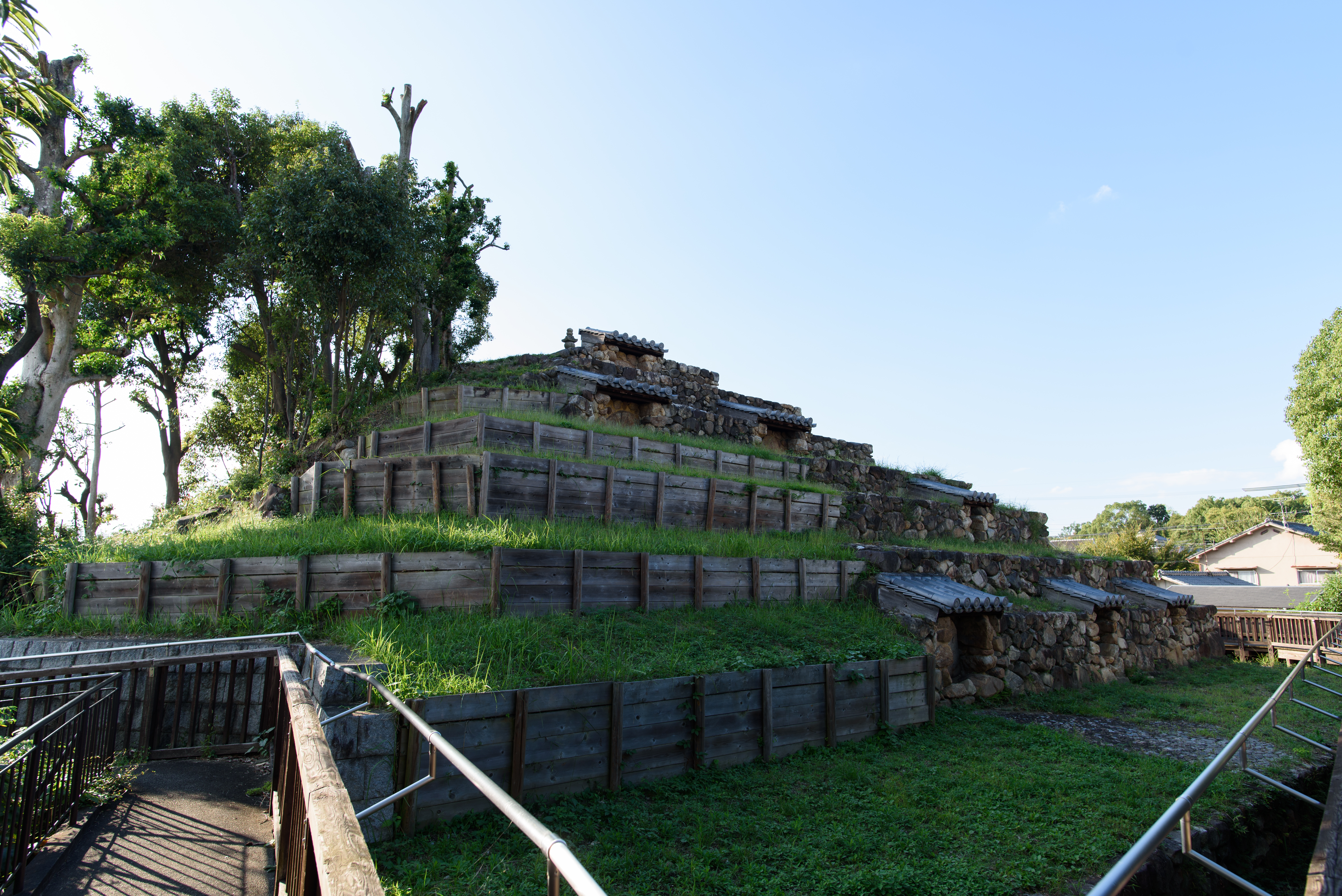
From the southeast corner

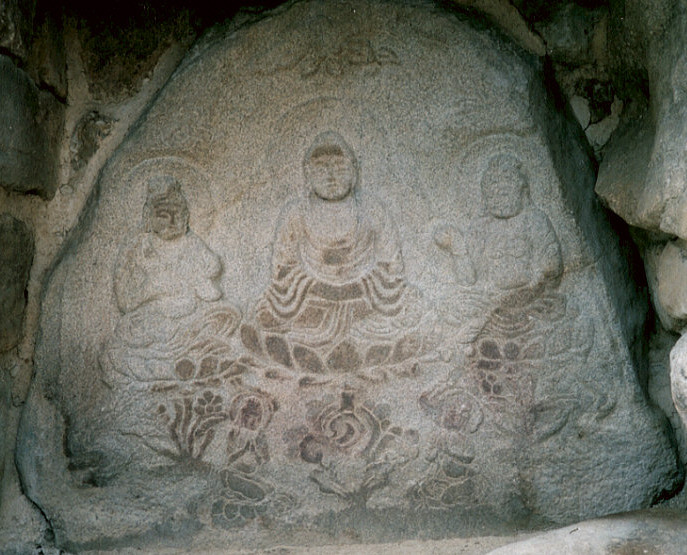
bas-relief image from the Zuto

== See also ==
- List of Historic Sites of Japan (Nara)
- Dotō
- Kumayama ruins
