= Dotō =

Nara period Buddhist temple in Osaka, Japan

- 土塔 (Japanese)
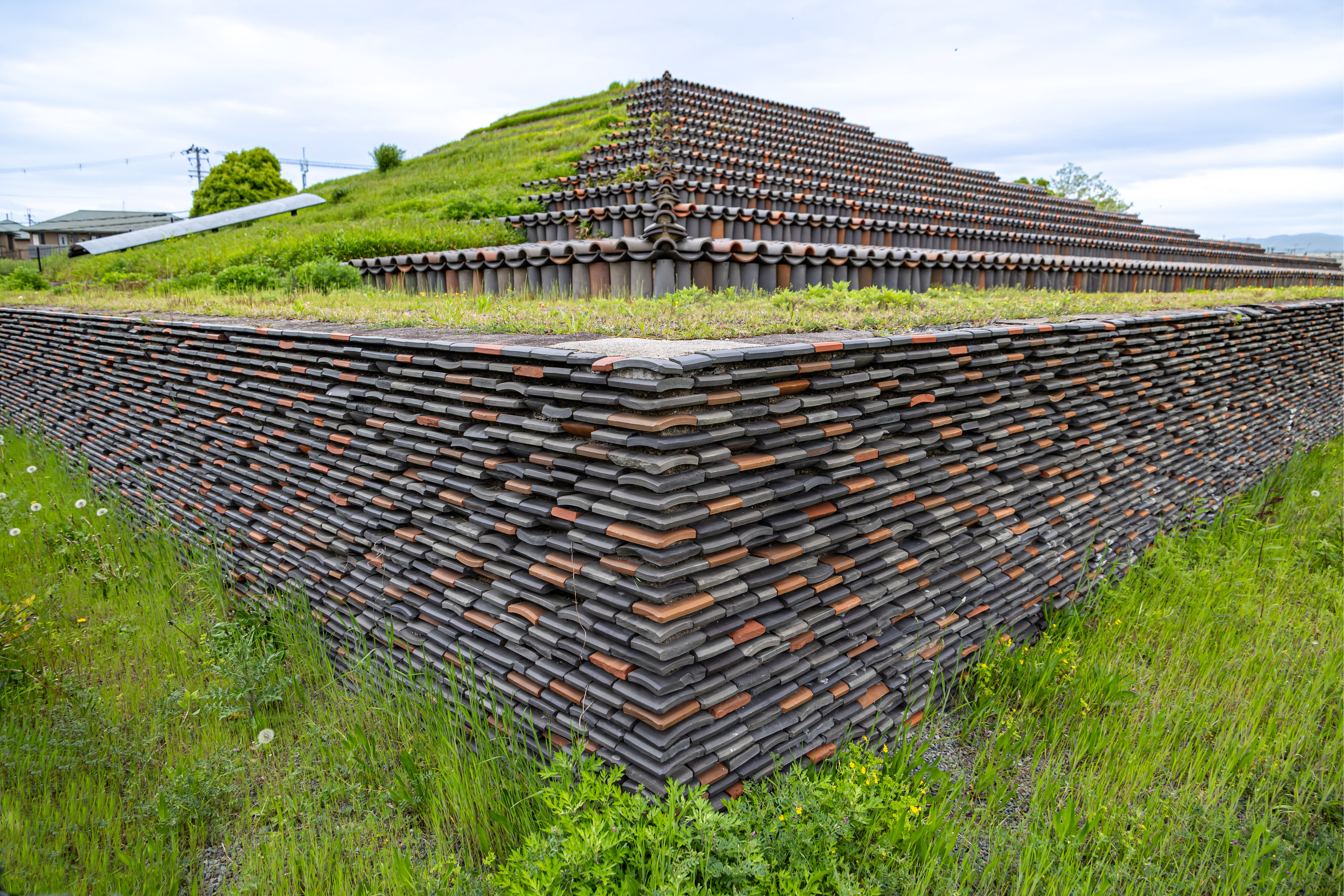
- Dotō

- Dotō Dotō (Japan)
- 34°31′56″N 135°30′31.9″E
- Type: temple ruins
- Periods: Nara period
- Location: Naka-ku, Sakai, Osaka Prefecture, Japan
- Region: Kansai region

History
- Built: 7th century AD

Site notes
- Public access: Yes (archaeological park, museum)
- Important Cultural Property National Historic Site of Japan

The Dotō (土塔, earth stupa), is a Nara period Buddhist relic located in the Dotō neighborhood of Naka-ku, in the city of Sakai, Osaka, Japan. It is also referred to as the Ōno-ji Dotō (大野寺土塔) after the temple on whose grounds it is located. It was designated as a National Historic Site in 1953, with the area under protection expanded in 2005.

== Overview ==
According to the Gyōki Nenpu (行基年譜), a Kamakura period semi-apocryphal biography of Gyōki, the famed priest established the temple of Ōno-ji in 727 AD, and the Dotō was built per his instructions at that time. This earthen stupa measures 53 meters on each side, with a height of approximately nine meters, and is orientated towards the four cardinal directions. It consists of 13 layers arranged like a step pyramid constructed by stacking clay blocks side by side, and compacting with soil in the spaces in between. The exposed portion each layer was covered with clay roof tiles, totaling about 60,000 in all. Of the tiles excavated, some 1300 are inscribed with letters written using spatula-shaped tools. Most of the inscriptions are the names of people various social strata such as monks, gentry, and commoners, who are believed to have donated the tiles as votive offerings. Some of the tiles have the date Jinki 4, which corresponds to the year 727 AD, and thus providing corroboration for the story in the Gyōki Nenpu. The temple of Ōno-ji was abandoned in the Muromachi period, but was later revived in the Edo Period.

Some of the artifacts recovered from the site (780 engraved roof tiles, 2 round eaves tiles, 4 examples of Sue ware pottery and 2 coins) were collectively designated a National Important Cultural Property in 2016 and are kept at the Sakai City Museum. The site itself has been restored to what archaeologists and historians believe to have been its original appearance, and opened to the public as a park in 2009.

A structure similar to theDotō is the Zutō in the Takabatake neighborhood of Nara city.

== Gallery ==
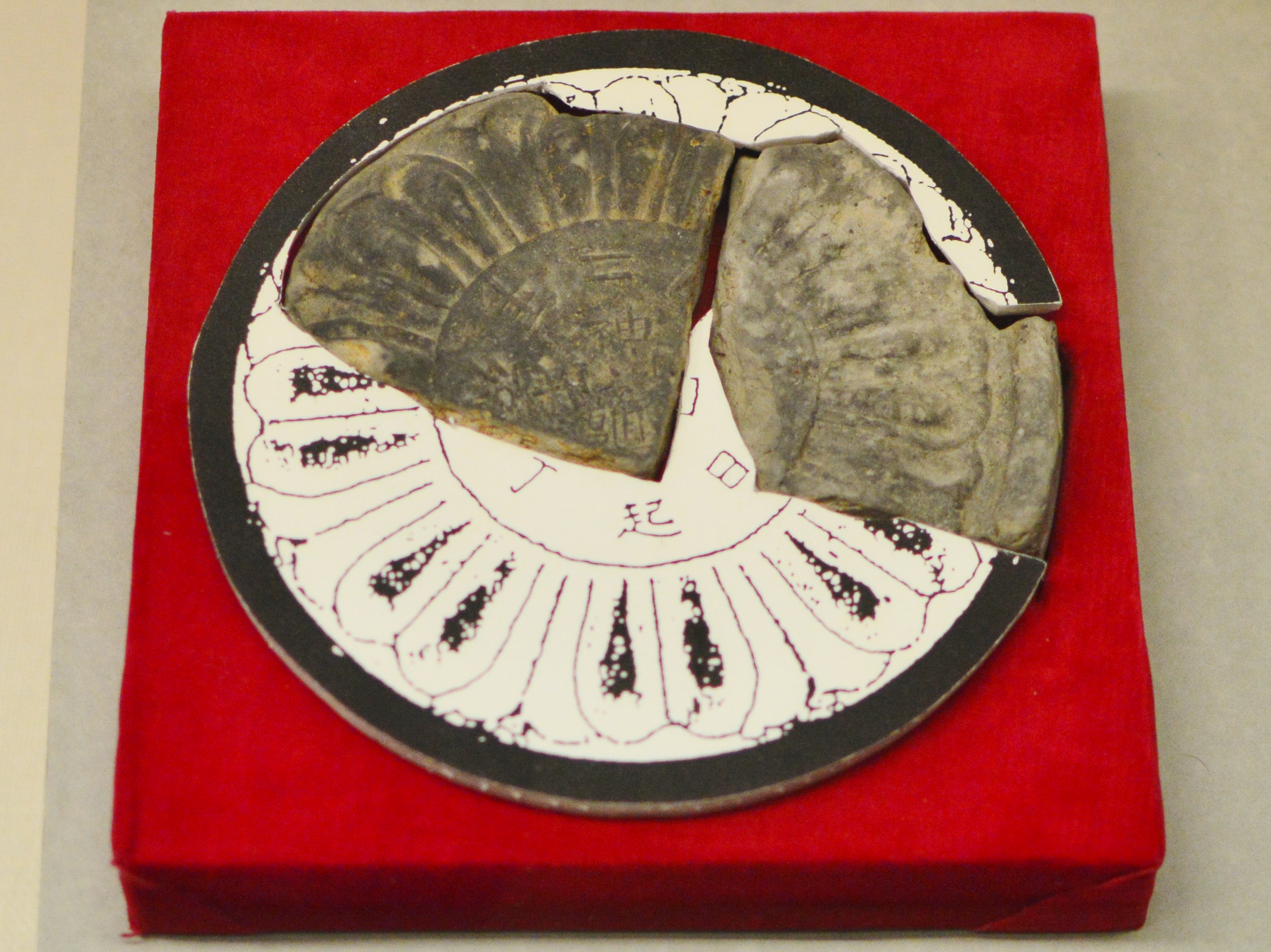
Roof tile fragments with date

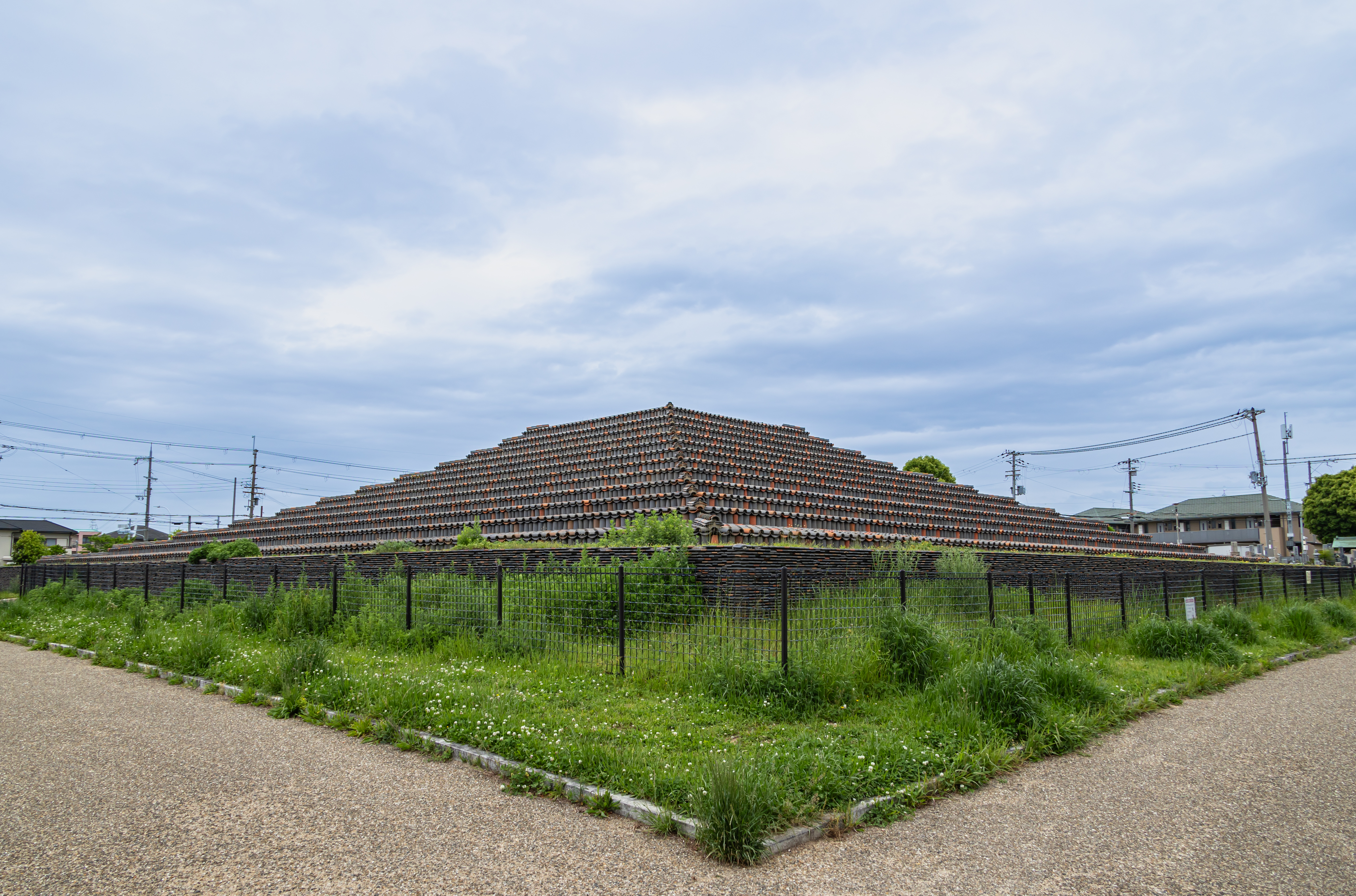
view from southwest corner

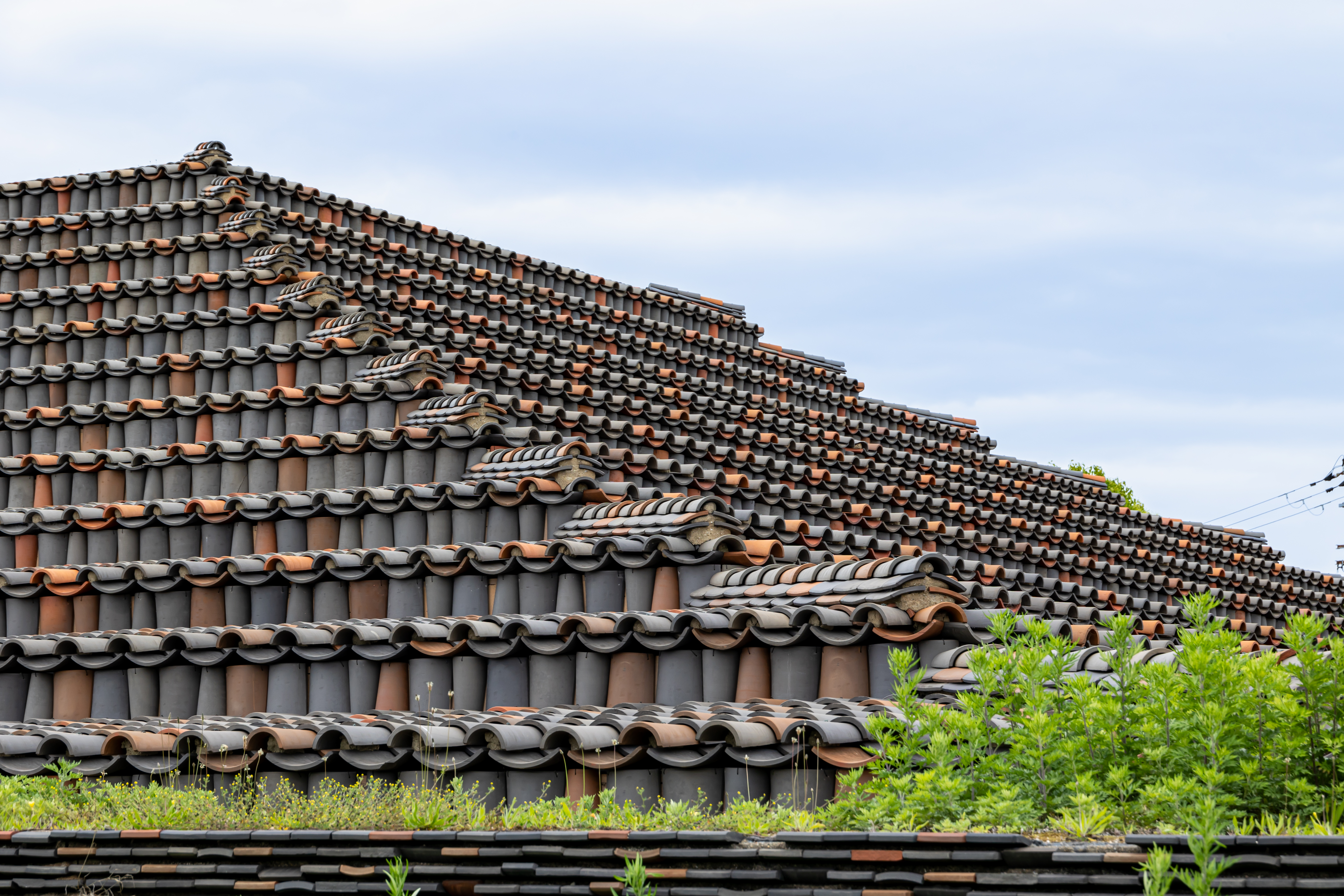
The roof tile of the restored

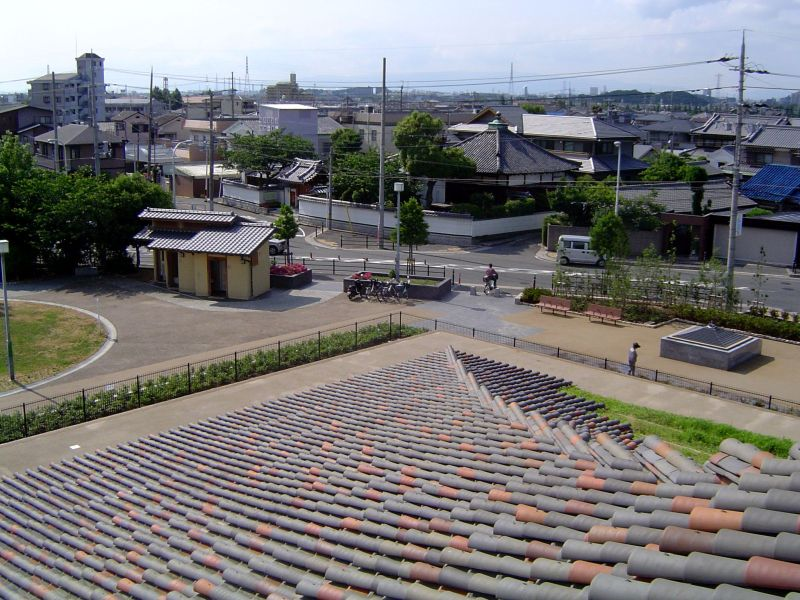
View from above

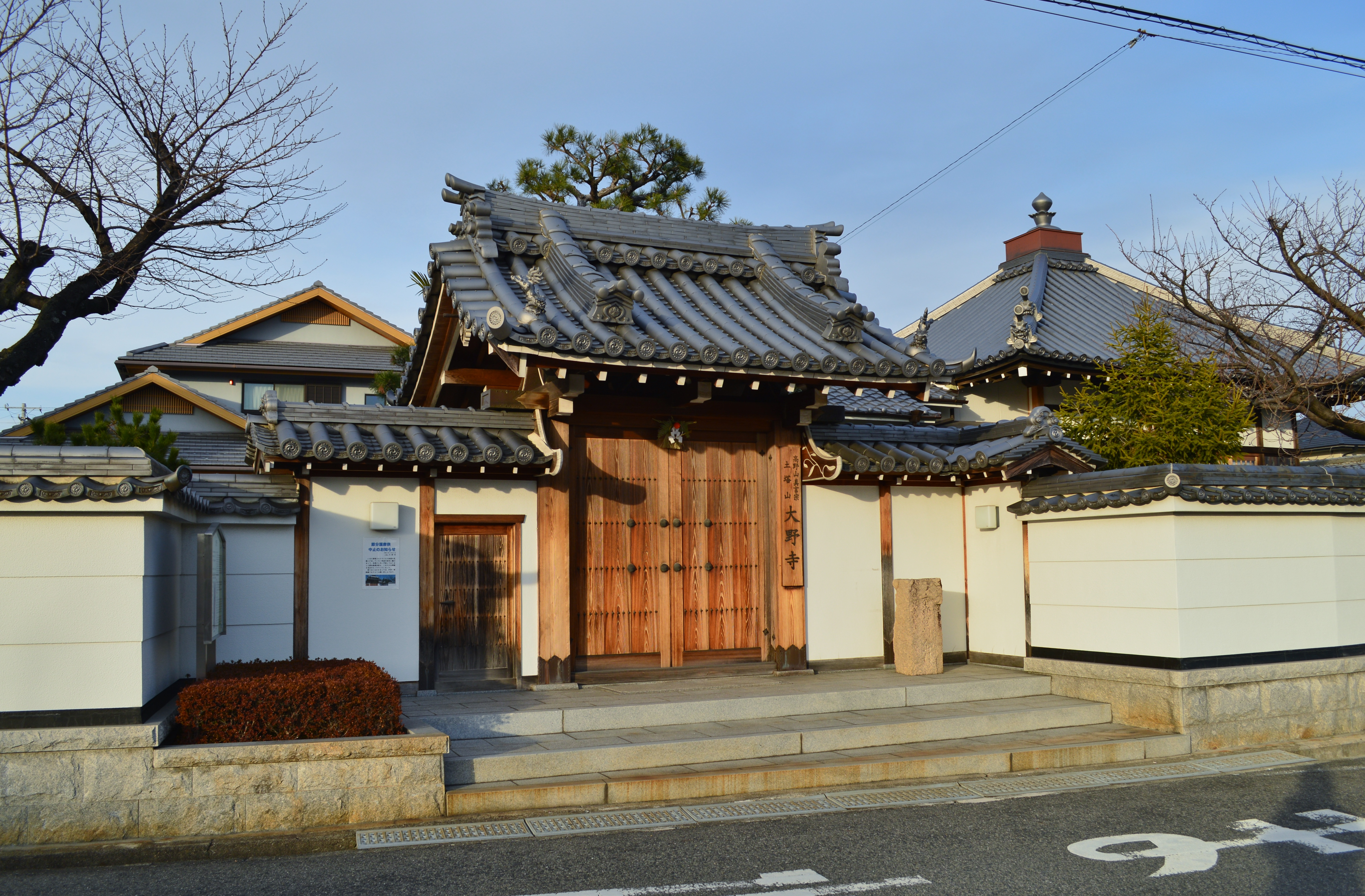
Modern Ōno-ji

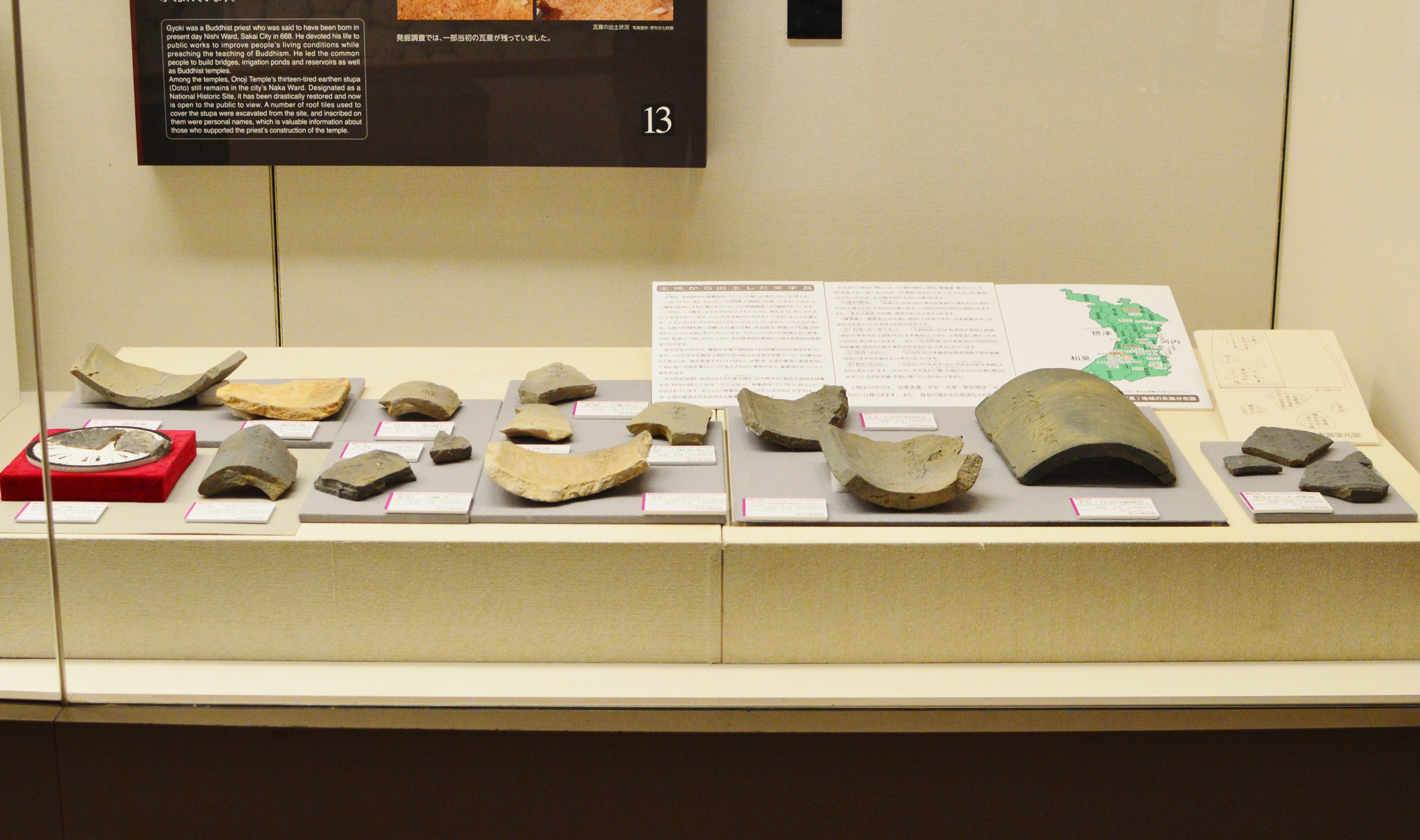
Excavated items at Sakai City Museum

== See also ==
- List of Historic Sites of Japan (Osaka)
- Zutō
- Kumayama ruins
