= Catherine Grubb =

British artist (born 1945)

- Born: 1945; Bellshill, Lanarkshire
- Died: 2023 (aged 77–78)
- Education: Edinburgh College of Art, University of Edinburgh

Catherine Grubb (1945-2023) was a British artist.

== Biography ==
Grubb was born in Bellshill in Lanarkshire to Scottish and Lithuanian parents, then lived in London as a child. Grubb studied at Edinburgh College of Art and the University of Edinburgh, and researched mediaeval artists' sketchbooks.

She worked in printmaking (etching) and painting, and taught at schools including Harrow School of Art.

Grubb had links to Cornwall since 1982, and lived in Truro as of 2020. She designed costumes for The Questors Theatre.

Her work is held in the Government Art Collection and in the art collection of the University of Stirling.

== Exhibitions ==
Exhibitions of her work have included:

- Ealing Professional Painters' Exhibition, 1972
- Exhibition at the Bull's Eye, Birmingham, 1974
- Bluecoat Gallery, Liverpool, 1976
- New Etchings by Catherine Grubb, at Questors' Theatre, 1985
- Etchings, at Uxbridge Central Library, 1989
- New Richmond Gallery, 1990
