= Brian Fogarty =

English writer and painter

- Born: Hackney, London, England
- Education: Chichester College of Further Education
- Occupations: Writer, poet and painter
- Website: brianfogarty.com

Brian Fogarty is an English novelist, short story writer, poet, painter, and printmaker.

== Biography ==
Fogarty was born in Hackney in the East End of London, England. He moved to Ealing in West London and aged 18 became lead singer in The City Lights, a rock band. He began to write songs and poetry. He then started writing novels, the first of which was The Cage. He studied acting at The Questors Theatre in Ealing and established The Intimate Theatre group. He wrote, directed, and acted in Journey into Autumn, a play with music and ballet, at the Oval House Theatre in London.

He moved to Chichester in West Sussex, continuing to write poetry and short stories. He also began to draw and paint. He studied for a year at Chichester College of Further Education and then travelled to live and teach English for two years in Sudan, where he learned Arabic. He also researched his novel Red over Blue.

On his return to England, Fogarty lived in Cambridge, where he taught English and worked on drafts of Red over Blue (initially called The Chrysalis). He published a short story, "The Greenhouse", in Panurge, a literary magazine. One of his poems, "The Nightdress", was published in the London Magazine.

In 1990, Fogarty moved to Brighton, continuing work on Red over Blue. He also began three further novels, including The Feeders. He restarted his painting and drawing. In 2005, he won the David Rose Prize of the Sussex County Arts Club for his painting That Blue Dress.

A collection of stories and poems, The Greenhouse, was published in 2006, followed by The Feeders and Red over Blue. In 2013, Fogarty held a solo exhibition of paintings, Soul in search of a canvas, at The Gallery in Cork Street, located in central London.
