= The Questors Theatre =

Venue in London

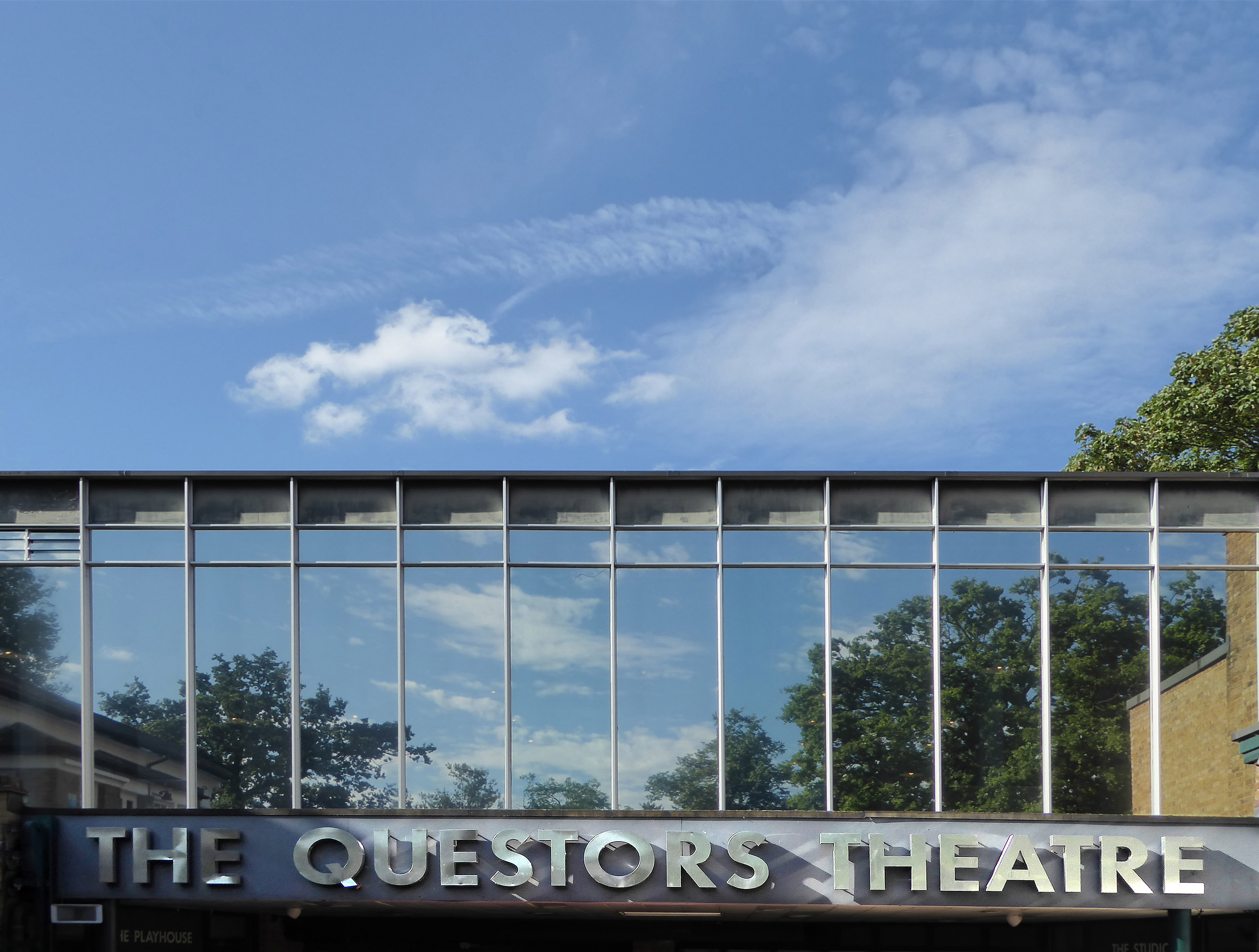
- Interactive map of The Questors Theatre
- Location: Ealing; London, W5; United Kingdom
- Coordinates: 51.51156°N 0.3097°W
- Capacity: 320-355 (Judi Dench Playhouse); 100 (Studio)
- Type: Non-professional community theatre
- Public transit: Ealing Broadway; West Ealing

Construction
- Opened: 1929; 97 years ago
- Rebuilt: 1964

Website
- www.questors.org.uk

The Questors Theatre is a theatre venue located in the London Borough of Ealing, West London. It is home of The Questors, a large theatre company which hosts a season of around twenty productions a year, not including visiting companies, and is a member of the Little Theatre Guild of Great Britain and the International Amateur Theatre Association.

== Activities ==
The Questors Theatre Club was founded in 1929 by a group of 17 amateur performers and friends, and pursued an adventurous artistic policy led by one of the founders, Alfred Emmet. Since 2005, The Questors Theatre has had a public licence, changing it from a club theatre and enabling public sales of tickets. The company also runs Questors Academy which provides actor training courses such as the Foundation Course in Acting, the Advanced Performance Course, Acting for All and a youth theatre, the Questors Youth Theatre.

== Site ==
In 1964 The Questors completed the construction of a new theatre building, which was opened by Queen Elizabeth the Queen Mother in April 1964, replacing the previous theatre building which had been converted from an old church. This new theatre's adaptable configuration was one of the first in a new wave of thrust stage theatres in Britain. In October 2014, to celebrate the fiftieth anniversary of the opening, it was renamed the Judi Dench Playhouse.

The site also contains a studio theatre (the Constantin Stanislavsky Room, built as a rehearsal room in 1960 and converted into a studio theatre in 1968), three rehearsal rooms (the Bernard Shaw Room built in 1958; the Michael Redgrave Room, opened in 1968, converted from part of the original Mattock Lodge; and the Alfred Emmet Room built in 1998), a scenery workshop, and a members' bar (The Grapevine, opened in 1959, converted from part of Mattock Lodge).

== History ==
The original building on the site, Mattock Lodge, is a house dating from the early 1850s, owned from around 1895 by Father O'Halloran who built a small church on the land behind the house, and on his death willed all the property to Miss Ann Webb as life tenant, who then lived in the house with her sister.

In 1933 The Questors Theatre Club, looking for a permanent venue, were invited to share the old church premises by the Ealing Boy Scouts. In 1938 The Questors took over as the sole users of the old church building and, following the death of Miss Webb, bought the freehold of the complete site on 25 April 1952 for £8,500.

== New plays ==
Throughout their history The Questors have regularly produced new plays, including an annual New Plays Festival from 1960 to 1977. They have staged three new plays by Rodney Ackland (The Dark River, 1943; The Diary of a Scoundrel, adapted from Ostrovsky, 1946; and The Other Palace, 1952), as well five new plays by James Saunders, four new plays by Dannie Abse, four new plays by David Mowat, and new plays by David Storey (Phoenix, 1984) and Ruth Prawer Jhabvala (Abode of Peace, 1984).

In September 1964, The Questors presented six one-act plays at the Forum-Theatre, Berlin. One of these was Guildenstern & Rosencrantz written and directed by Tom Stoppard. The cast included Peter Whelan as Guildenstern. The production was staged the following month at The Questors Theatre, and Stoppard subsequently expanded his one-act play into Rosencrantz and Guildenstern Are Dead.

== Training ==
The Questors established a Student Group in 1946 to train actors, now known as the Foundation Course in Acting. Initially it was a one-year part-time course, but since 1949 has offered two years of part-time training to include the Advanced Performance Course, based on the acting techniques of Constantin Stanislavski. The Questors also run a large youth theatre (which in 2013-14 had about 460 members) the Questors Youth Theatre and evening classes for beginner actors.

== Coarse acting ==
Writer Michael Green drew upon his experiences as an acting member of The Questors (from 1953) when he wrote his book The Art of Coarse Acting (published 1964) which he dedicated to The Questors. In 1972 The Questors hosted the World Coarse Acting Championship, and then took The Coarse Acting Show to the 1977 Edinburgh Festival Fringe and The Coarse Acting Show 2 to the 1979 Festival Fringe.The Coarse Acting Show 2 subsequently transferred to the Shaftesbury Theatre, London, where it was visited by the Prince of Wales. In 1984 The Questors presented the Third Great Coarse Acting Show at The Questors Theatre (which was again visited by the Prince of Wales), and in 1988 took Coarse Acting Strikes Back to the Edinburgh Festival Fringe.

== Costume design ==
The artist Catherine Grubb has had a long association with The Questors, and provided costume design for a number of their productions.

== Presidents ==
Among those who accepted an invitation between 1930 and 1944 to serve as The Questors' Presidents were Robert Atkins, Ion Swinley, Ben Webster, Gwen Ffrangcon-Davies and Margaret Webster. Subsequent presidents have been:

- John Burrell (1944–52)
- Tyrone Guthrie (1952–58)
- Michael Redgrave (1958–85)
- Judi Dench (1985–present)

== Notable people ==
- Hainsley Lloyd Bennett
- Helen Blatch
- Brian Fogarty
- Jo Hartley
- Rahul Kohli
- Art Malik
- Alan Mehdizadeh
