= Michael Wharton =

British newspaper columnist

- Born: Michael Bernhard Nathan; 19 April 1913; Shipley, West Riding of Yorkshire, England
- Died: 23 January 2006 (aged 92); High Wycombe, Buckinghamshire, England
- Education: Bradford Grammar School
- Alma mater: Lincoln College, Oxford
- Occupation: Columnist
- Employer(s): The Daily Telegraph; The Sunday Telegraph; BBC

Michael Wharton (19 April 1913 – 23 January 2006) was a British newspaper columnist who wrote under the pseudonym Peter Simple in the British Daily Telegraph. He began work on the "Way of the World" column with illustrator Michael ffolkes three times a week in early 1957, and wrote the column four times a week for a lengthy period ending in 1987. On 13 May 1990 he began a weekly Peter Simple column in the Sunday Telegraph, before returning to the Daily Telegraph as a weekly columnist on 8 March 1996. He remained there until his death, aged 92, in 2006, his last column appearing on 20 January 2006.

== Life and career ==
Wharton was born as Michael Bernhard Nathan, the son of a businessman of German-Jewish origin, at Shipley, in the West Riding of Yorkshire ("Wharton" was the maiden name of his mother). Wharton was educated at Bradford Grammar School and Lincoln College, Oxford. His career at Oxford was undistinguished, partly because he spent his time writing Sheldrake, a novel that had little success when published in 1958. After Oxford, Wharton served in the Royal Artillery from 1940 to 1946, rising to the rank of Major (acting Lieutenant-Colonel), "but", in his own words, "only in Intelligence". He then worked for the BBC as a producer and scriptwriter, but left in 1956.

His two volumes of quasi-autobiography, The Missing Will and A Dubious Codicil, combined his fantasy world with the mundane reality of the life as a jobbing journalist. Wharton married three times. His daughter and literary executor, Jane Wharton, works as a psychotherapist. His son by his first marriage, Nicholas Nathan, is a philosopher.

== Wharton's characters ==
The column satirised what Wharton saw as modern, fashionable ideas, and readers often claimed to recognise his invented characters in real people. Not fictional was the column's presiding spirit, Colonel Sibthorp, an eccentric and reactionary Victorian Member of Parliament, about whom Wharton made a BBC radio documentary in 1954 and then a "centenary celebration" the following year.

== Controversy ==
"Fulminator", in his Daily Telegraph blog, said of Wharton:

Wharton’s political views were so far removed from the mainstream that they’re practically unclassifiable – a feudalist and a rabid reactionary, certainly (he invented the fictitious Feudal and Reactionary Herald). He hated “Progress”, loathed communism and socialism with a passion, and wasn’t keen on capitalism or money-grubbing in general.

Writing in The Independent J. W. M. Thompson suggested:

As befitted a satirist who was wounded by the changes he observed in his country, he had a profound attachment to the land and a true Tory's nostalgia for an idealised vision of its past.

Wharton consistently criticised and ridiculed what he described as the "race relations industry", and one of his most famous comic creations was the "prejudometer", an anti-racist instrument that supplied readings in prejudons, the "internationally recognised scientific unit of racial prejudice", when pointed at a suspected racist. Concerned individuals could even point the prejudometer at themselves:

At 3.6 degrees on the Alibhai-Brown scale, it sets off a shrill scream that will not stop until you've pulled yourself together with a well-chosen anti-racist slogan.

Wharton was accused in his Times obituary of "sometimes veer[ing] into the area of straightforward racism" and of being- despite his own Jewish ancestry- "prone to anti-semitic innuendo" for such passages as this:

Almost single-handed, Ariel Sharon may have ended the Jews' virtual immunity from hostile criticism that Hitler's persecution assured for more than 50 years. Anti-semitism is stirring. So far it may be only the so-called "anti-semitism" of people who think of the immense influence the Jews have in the world, and wonder whether it is always, everywhere and in every way an influence for good. First that; but later, for worse, the real thing.

However the quote occurs in a context of a passage gleefully satirising the Boycott Israel movement.

His obituary in The Guardian pursued the same thread:

In his comment paragraphs, he aired a conservatism light years to the right of most conservatives, stealing sometimes into fleeting, only half-retracted, laments for the Europe that Hitler's New Order might have created.

Michael Wharton held Adolf Hitler to be a radical, a revolutionary totally opposed to conservative principles.

== Related columns ==
Wharton wrote four columns in a week for the last time from 25–28 August 1987. After Wharton expressed his desire to write less often, Way of the World was written initially three times a week, and subsequently twice weekly until the spring of 1990, by Christopher Booker under the name Peter Simple II, with Wharton continuing to write the column once a week initially on Fridays, but then on Thursdays until 3 May 1990. In 1990 the Peter Simple column and the Way of the World column became fully separate entities, and for the next ten years (7 May 1990 – 16 December 2000) the Way of the World column was written by Auberon Waugh, who died in January 2001. It was then written by the satirist Craig Brown until he left the Telegraph late in 2008. A. N. Wilson began to write a column also under the title Peter Simple II in The Sunday Telegraph on 26 February 2006, but it did not last long.

== See also ==
- List of Peter Simple characters

== Admirers of Peter Simple ==
- Simon Hoggart – parliamentary sketch writer for The Guardian.
- A. N. Wilson – novelist and journalist.
- Auberon Waugh – wrote The Daily Telegraph's Way of the World column after Wharton's semi-retirement.
- Alexander Waugh – writer and son of Auberon Waugh.
- Kingsley Amis, who wrote an introduction to The Stretchford Chronicles: 25 Years of Peter Simple (1980).

== Bibliography ==
- The Missing Will (1984) (first volume of autobiography)
- A Dubious Codicil (1991) (second volume)
- Sheldrake (Anthony Blond and Allan Wingate, London, 1958) (novel)

== Compilations (illustrated by Michael ffolkes) ==
- Way of the World (1) (1957)
- Way of the World (2) (1963)
- Peter Simple in Opposition (1965)
- More of Peter Simple (1969)
- The Thoughts of Peter Simple (1971)
- The World of Peter Simple (1973)
- A Choice of Peter Simple 1973–1975 (1975)
- Peter Simple's Way of the World 1975–1977 (1978)
- The Stretchford Chronicles: 25 Years of Peter Simple (1980)
- The Best of Peter Simple (1984)
- Far Away is Close at Hand (1995)
- Peter Simple's World (1998)
- Peter Simple's Century (1999)
- Peter Simple's Domain (2003)
