= Wolf-Ferrari =

Wolf-Ferrari:

- Ermanno Wolf-Ferrari (1876–1948), Italian composer and teacher
  - List of operas by Wolf-Ferrari
- Manno Wolf-Ferrari (1911–1994), Italian conductor, and a nephew of Ermanno
- Teodoro Wolf Ferrari (1878–1945), Italian painter

== See also ==
- Wolf (name)
- Ferrari (disambiguation)
