= The Art of Coarse Acting =

1964 humor book by Michael Green

- first edition
- Author: Michael Green
- Publisher: Hutchinson
- Publication date: 1964

The Art of Coarse Acting is a 1964 humorous book on amateur theatre by British journalist Michael Green, following the success of his The Art of Coarse Rugby in 1960.

Green describes a coarse actor as:

one who can remember his lines, but not the order in which they come. An amateur. One who performs in Church Halls. Often the scenery will fall down. Sometimes the Church Hall may fall down. Invariably his tights will fall down. He will usually be playing three parts – Messenger, 2nd Clown, an Attendant Lord. His aim is to upstage the rest of the cast. His hope is to be dead by Act II so that he can spend the rest of his time in the bar. His problems? Everyone else connected with the production.

Green had a friend called Askew, with whom he had wrecked many a carefully planned production. Askew had a list of parts which enabled him to sneak away to the boozer, thanks to an early exit: Polonius, Lord Scroop, Constable of France, Doolittle, Prince of Aragon, etc., etc.

Green, who had been involved in amateur theatre in the Midlands and London, dedicated the book to the Northampton Drama Club, Northampton Players, The Crescent Theatre, Birmingham, and The Questors Theatre, Ealing, all of whom (with the exception of Northampton Players) are still active. He also acknowledged the help of The Questors Theatre with the illustrations.

The book was turned into a play, which received popularity and success at the 1977 Edinburgh Festival Fringe, and was then transferred to London's West End, where fans included Princess Diana and Prince Charles.
