= Step pyramid =

Architectural structure that uses flat platforms or steps to form geometric pyramid

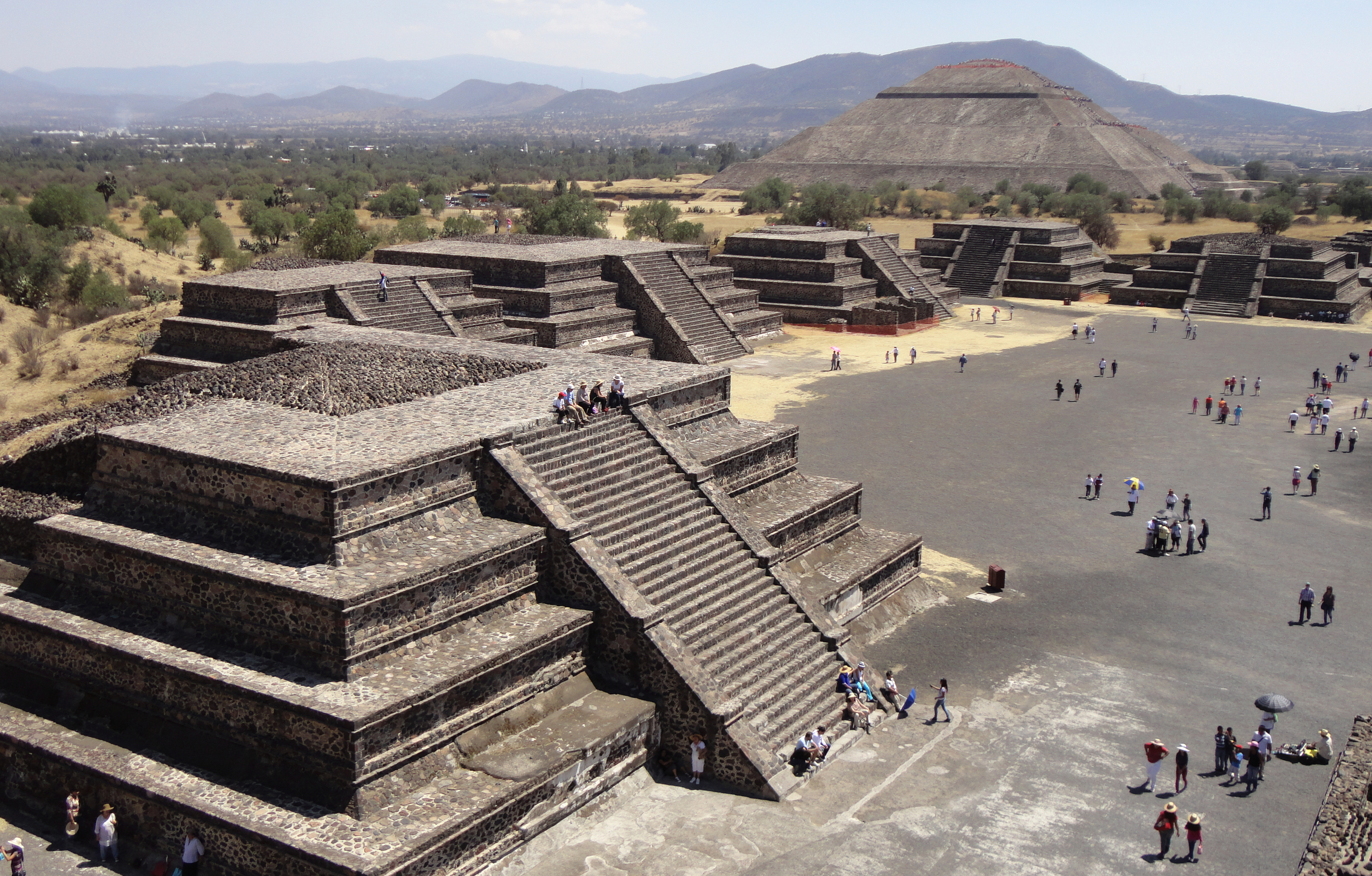
Stepped pyramids in Teotihuacan, Mexico

A step pyramid or stepped pyramid is an architectural structure that uses flat platforms, or steps, receding from the ground up, to achieve a completed shape similar to a geometric pyramid. Step pyramids – typically large and made of several layers of stone – are found in several cultures throughout history, in several locations throughout the world, with no known connections between the different civilizations that built them. These independent adoptions of a similar design presumably emerged at least partly because step pyramids have a lower center of mass than would a structure with straight vertical sides and are thus inherently more stable.

== Mesopotamia ==
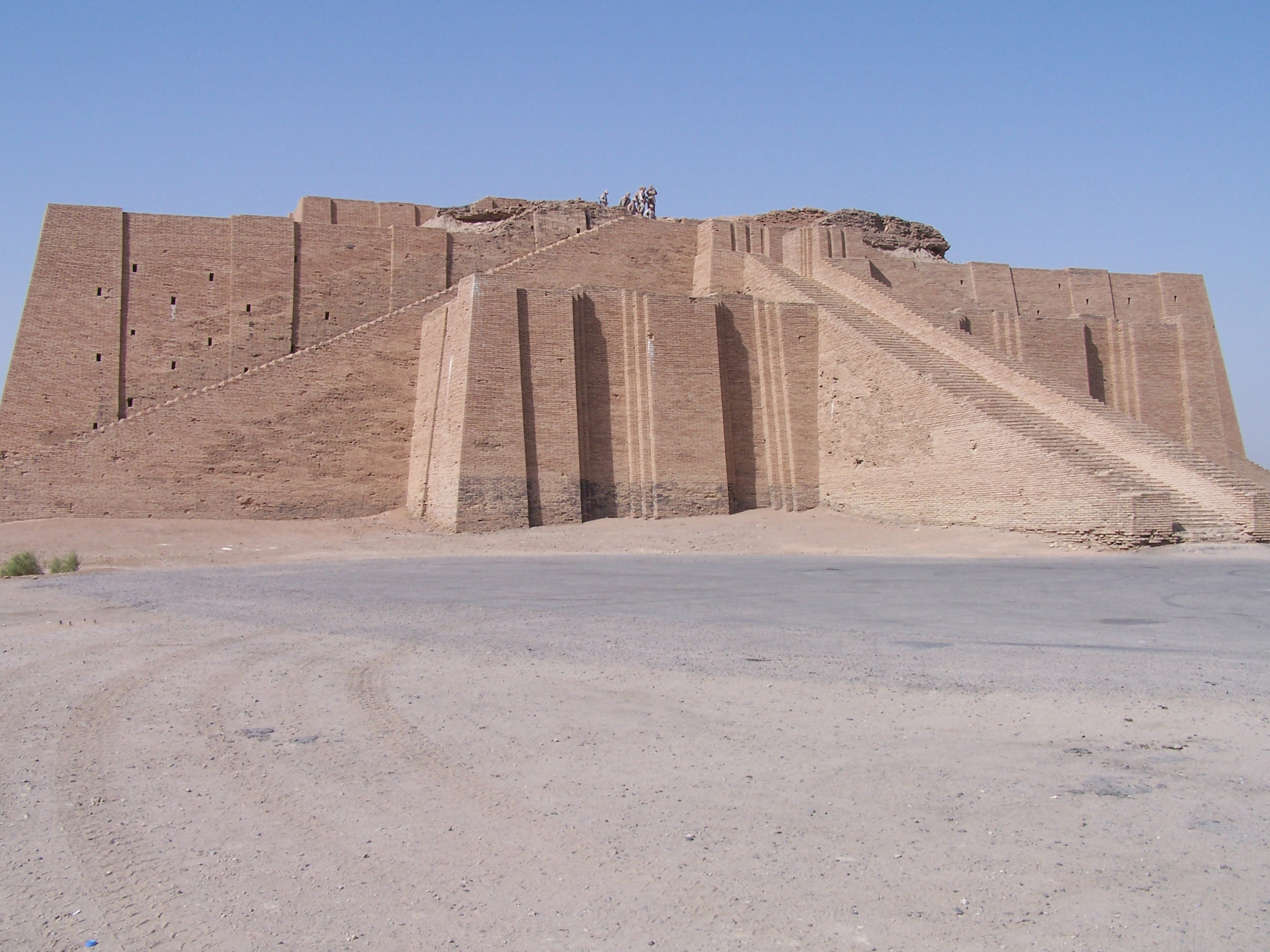
The 4100-year-old Great Ziggurat of Ur in southern Iraq

Ziggurats were huge religious monuments built in the ancient Mesopotamian valley and western Iranian plateau, having the form of a terraced step pyramid of successively receding stories or levels. There are 32 ziggurats known in, and near, Mesopotamia. Twenty-eight of them are in Iraq, and four of them are in Iran. Notable Ziggurats include the Great Ziggurat of Ur near Nasiriyah, Iraq, the Ziggurat of Aqar Quf near Baghdad, Iraq, Chogha Zanbil in Khūzestān, Iran, the most recent to be discovered – Sialk near Kashan, Iran and others.

Ziggurats were built by the Sumerians, Babylonians, Elamites and Assyrians as monuments to local religions. The probable predecessors of the ziggurat were temples supported on raised platforms or terraces that date from the Ubaid period during the 4th millennium BC, and the latest date from the 6th century BC. The earliest ziggurats probably date from the latter part of the Early Dynastic Period of Sumer. Built in receding tiers upon a rectangular, oval, or square platform, the ziggurat was a pyramidal structure. Sun-baked bricks made up the core of the ziggurat with facings of fired bricks on the outside. The facings were often glazed in different colors and may have had astrological significance. Kings sometimes had their names engraved on these glazed bricks. The number of tiers ranged from two to seven, with a shrine or temple at the summit. Access to the shrine was provided by a series of ramps on one side of the ziggurat or by a spiral ramp from base to summit. It was also called Hill of Heaven or Mountain of the gods.

== Ancient Egypt ==
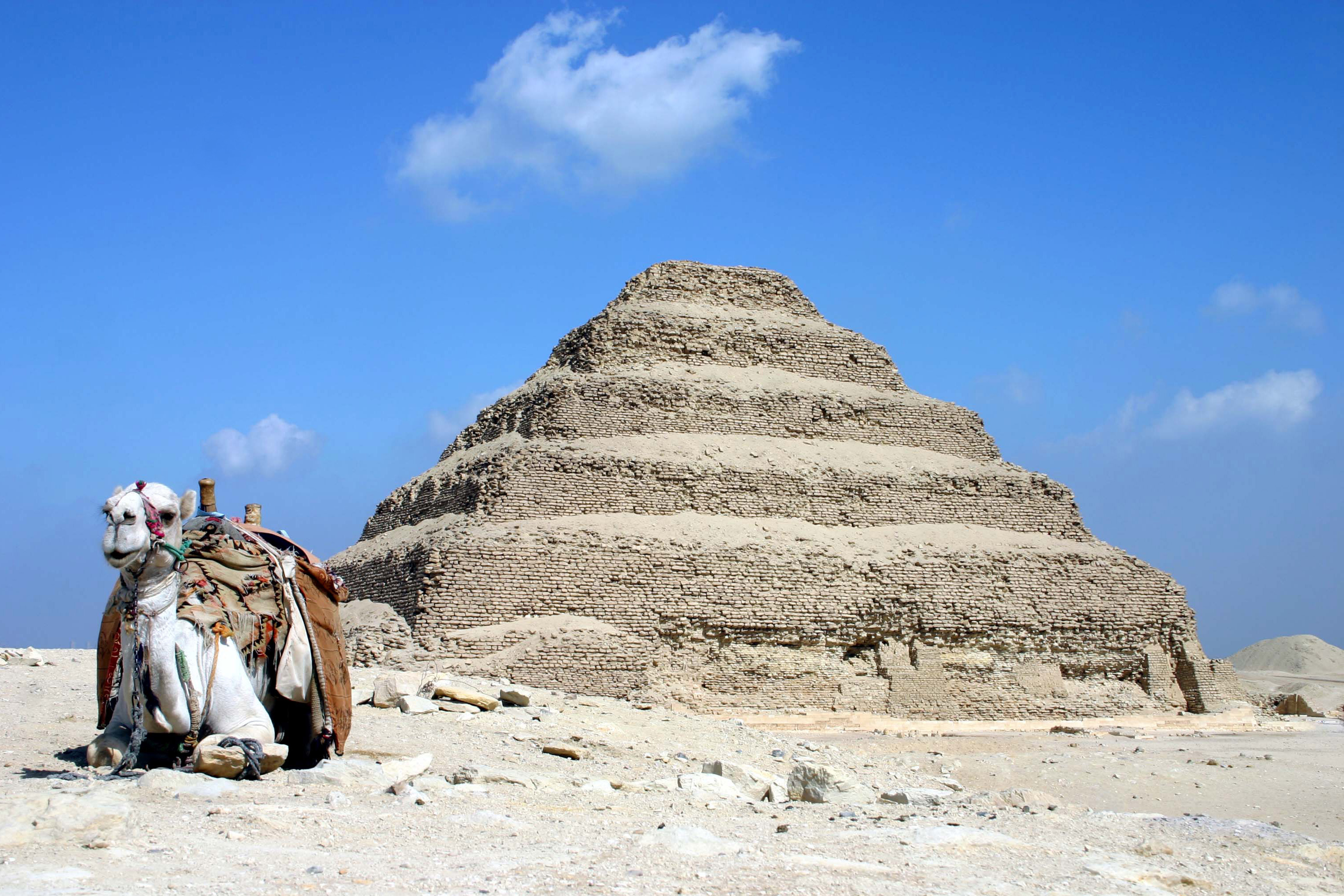
Pyramid of Djoser in 2010

The earliest Egyptian pyramids were step pyramids. In the First Dynasty at Saqqara, a large step pyramid like structure was found within the interior of Mastaba 3808 dating to the reign of the pharaoh Anedjib. Egyptologist Walter B Emery found other mastabas of this late 1st Dynasty period that may have been of similar design in which several inscriptions depicting step pyramids during this era are also found, mostly credited to Anedjib's successor Qa'a. The first recognized step pyramid, however, dates to the beginning of the Third Dynasty attributed to the pharaoh Djoser. Though Egyptologists often credit his vizier Imhotep as its architect, the Dynastic Egyptians themselves, contemporaneously or in numerous later Dynastic writings about the character, did not credit him with either the designing of the Pyramid of Djoser or the invention of stone architecture. Djoser's pyramid was first built as a square mastaba like structure, which as a rule were known to otherwise be rectangular, and expanded several times by way of a series of accretion layers to produce the stepped pyramid structure we see today. Later pharaohs, including Sekhemkhet and possibly Khaba, built similar structures, known as the Buried Pyramid and the Layer Pyramid, respectively.

In the Fourth Dynasty, the Egyptians began to build "true pyramids" with smooth sides. The earliest of these pyramids, located at Meidum, was first constructed as a finished "tower-shaped" step pyramid like structure and later converted to a true pyramid which at some point this layer collapsed. Though there is disagreement among Egyptologists whether Sneferu or his predecessor Huni built the tower core, it is generally accepted Sneferu at the least was responsible for converting it to a true pyramid. Sneferu is also credited with building two other pyramids, the Bent Pyramid and the Red Pyramid at Dahshur, which were the first true pyramids to be built as such from the beginning. Though with this innovation the outwardly appearance of Egyptian stepped pyramids came to an end in favor of smooth-sided true pyramids, the pyramids that followed whose cores have been exposed all show some form of stepped pyramid at their center.

== Africa ==
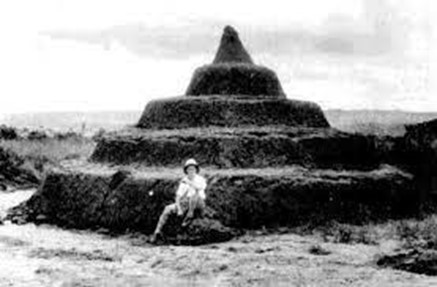
Nsude Pyramid

One of the unique structures of Igboland was the Nsude Pyramids, at the Nigerian town of Nsude, northern Igboland. Ten pyramidal structures were built of clay/mud. The first base section was 60 ft. in circumference and 3 ft. in height. The next stack was 45 ft. in circumference. Circular stacks continued, till it reached the top. The structures were temples for the god Ala/Uto, who was believed to reside at the top. A stick was placed at the top to represent the god's residence. The structures were laid in groups of five parallel to each other. Because it was built of clay/mud, time has taken its toll requiring periodic reconstruction.

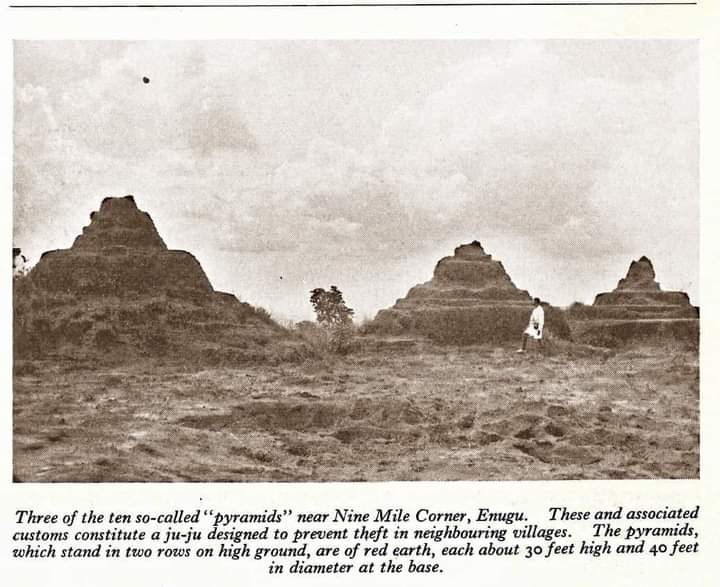
Three Nsude pyramids

== Europe ==
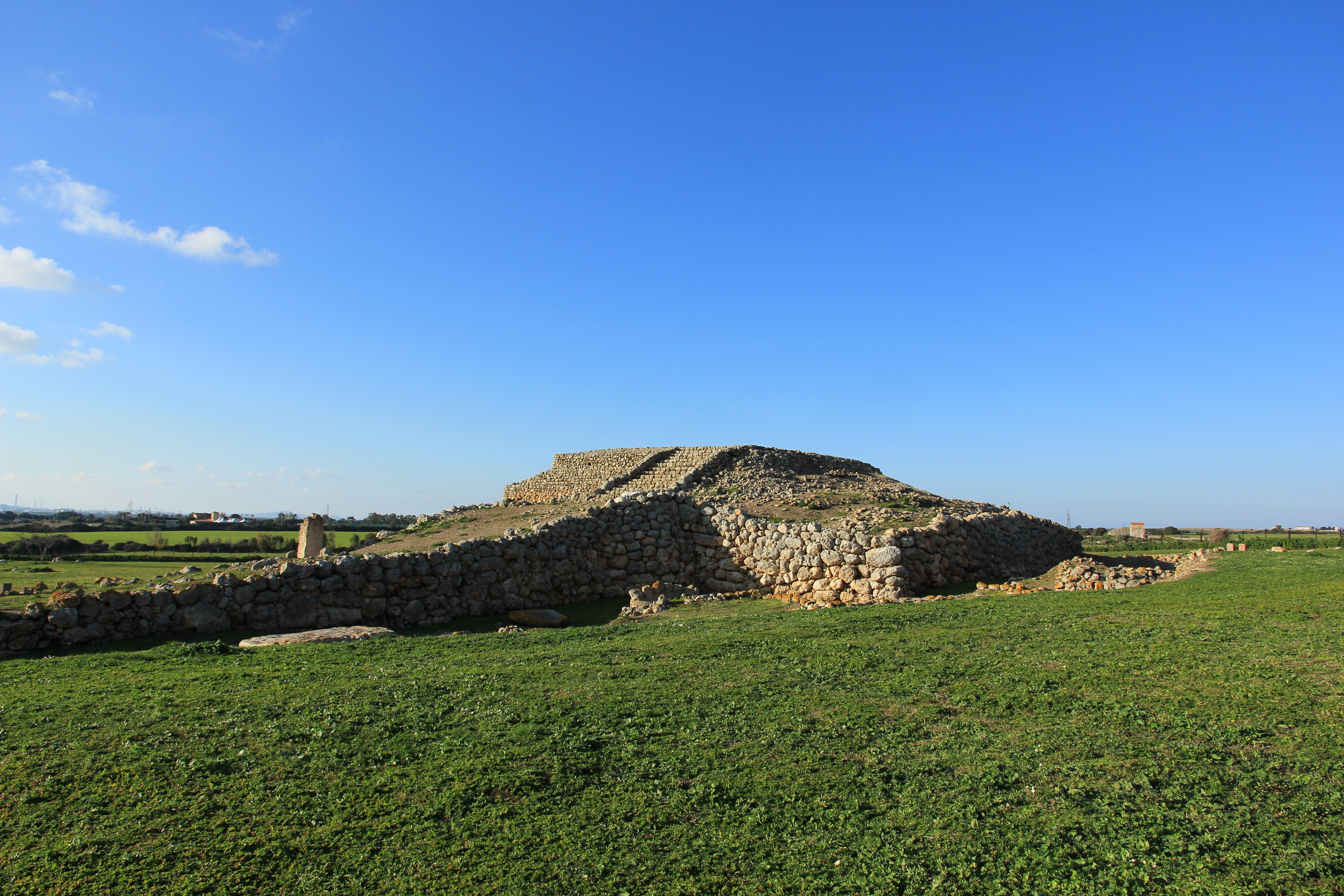
Monte d'Accoddi, Sardinia

A step pyramid exists in the archaeological site of Monte d'Accoddi, in Sardinia, dating to the 4th millennium BC: "a trapezoidal platform on an artificial mound, reached by a sloped causeway. At one time a rectangular structure sat atop the platform ... the platform dates from the Copper Age (c. 2700–2000 BC), with some minor subsequent activity in the Early Bronze Age (c. 2000–1600 BC). Near the mound are several standing stones, and a large limestone slab, now at the foot of the mound, may have served as an altar."

== Mesoamerica ==
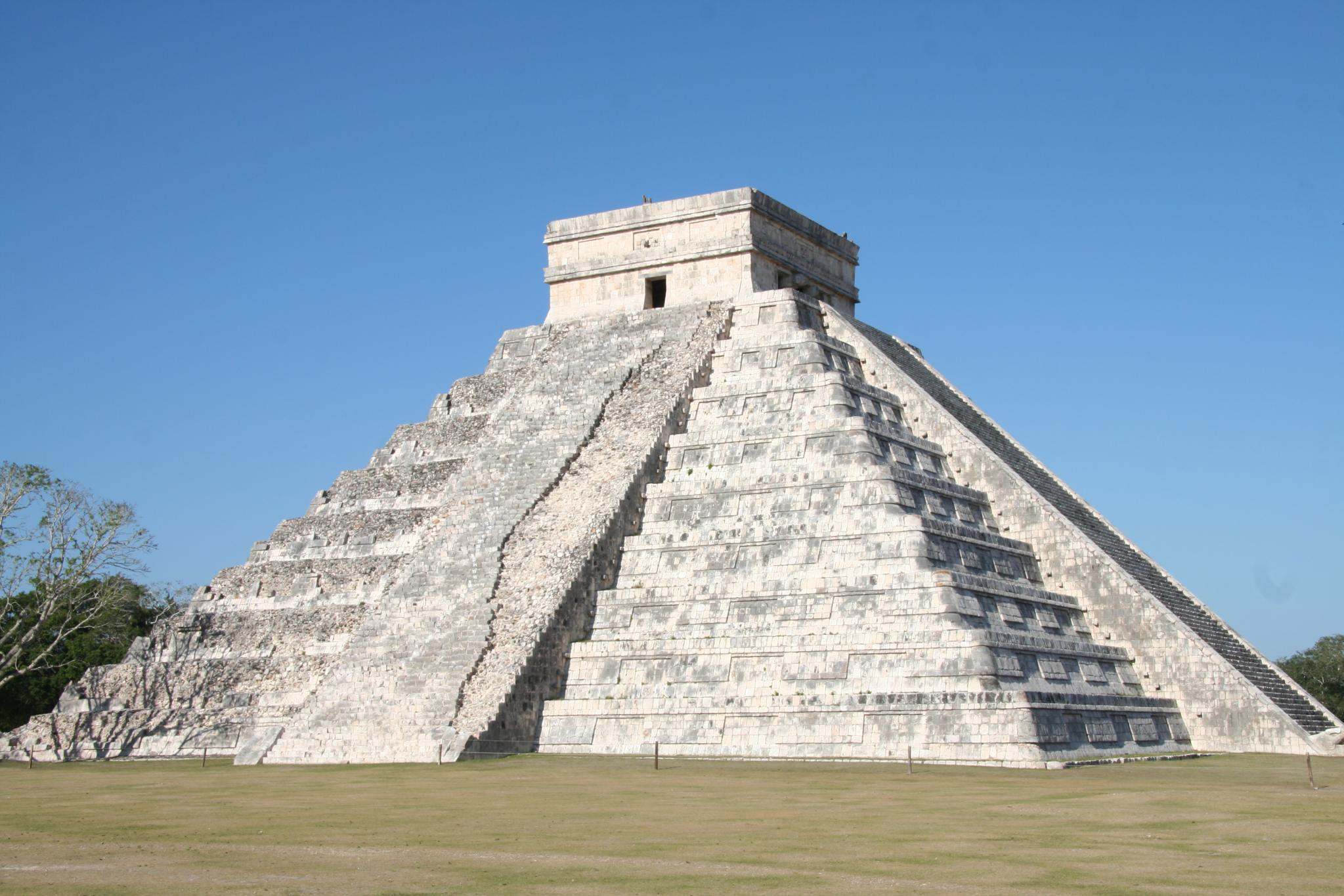
El Castillo, Chichen Itza, Mexico

The most prolific builders of these step pyramids were the pre-Columbian civilizations. The remains of step pyramids can be found throughout the Mayan cities of the Yucatán, as well as in Aztec and Toltec architecture. In many of these cases, successive layers of pyramids were built on top of the pre-existing structures, with which the pyramids expanded in size on a cyclical basis. This is true of the Great Pyramid of Cholula and of the Great Pyramid of Tenochtitlan.

== South America ==
Step pyramids were also a part of South American architecture, such as that of the Moche and the Chavín culture.

== North America ==
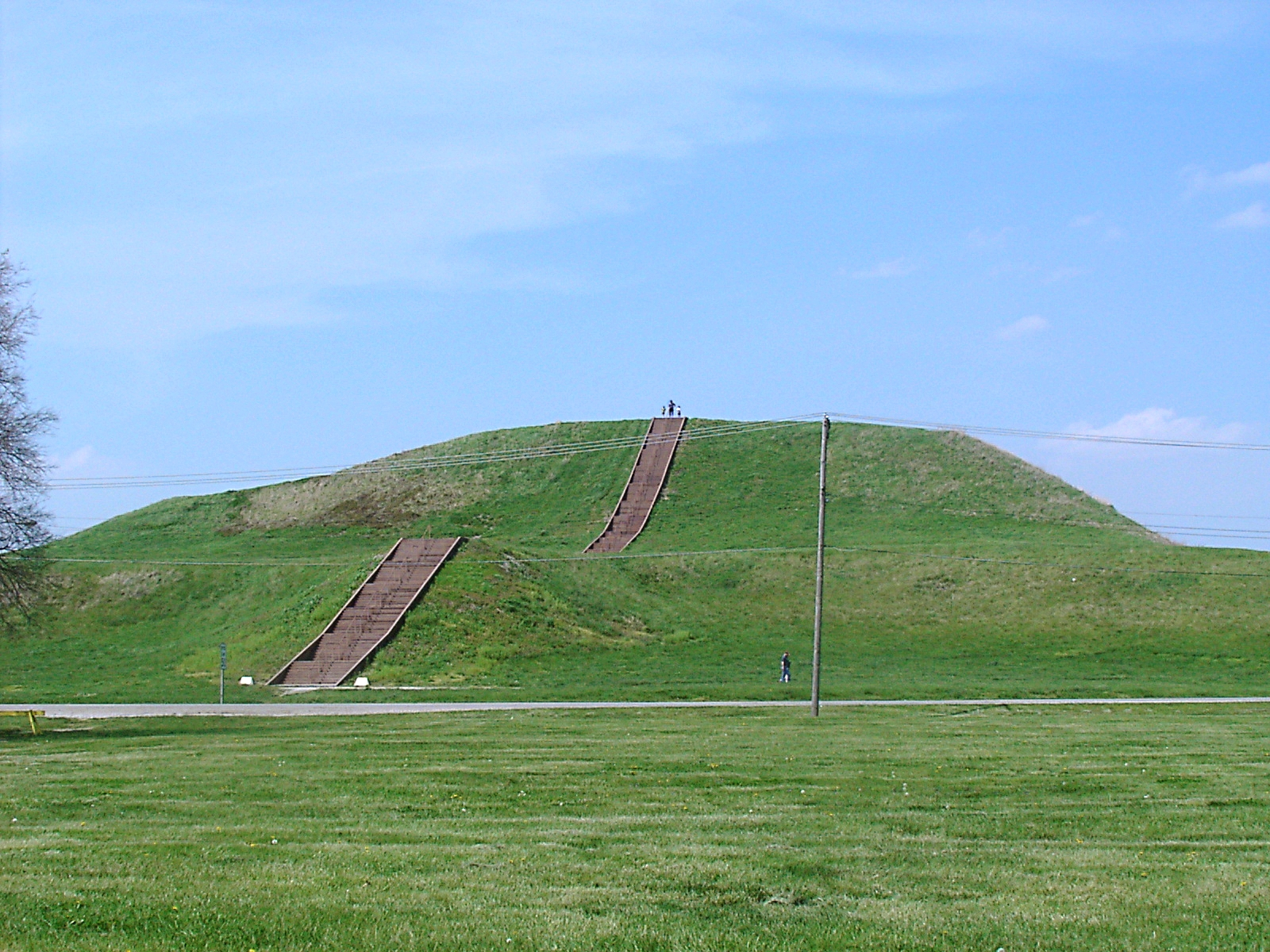
Monks Mound in summer. The concrete staircase follows the approximate course of the ancient wooden stairs.

There are a number of earthwork step pyramids within North America. Often associated with mounds and other mortuary complexes across the Eastern Woodlands (concentrated in the North American Southeast), step pyramids were constructed as ceremonial centers by the Mississippian cultures (900–1500 CE), and are regarded as a facet of the Southeastern Ceremonial Complex.

The largest earthen work step pyramid of this type in North America is Monks Mound, located in present-day Cahokia, Illinois. With the base of the structure exceeding 16 acres Monks Mound is also one of the largest pyramids by area in the world (after El Mirador and Great Pyramid of Cholula).

== Cambodia ==
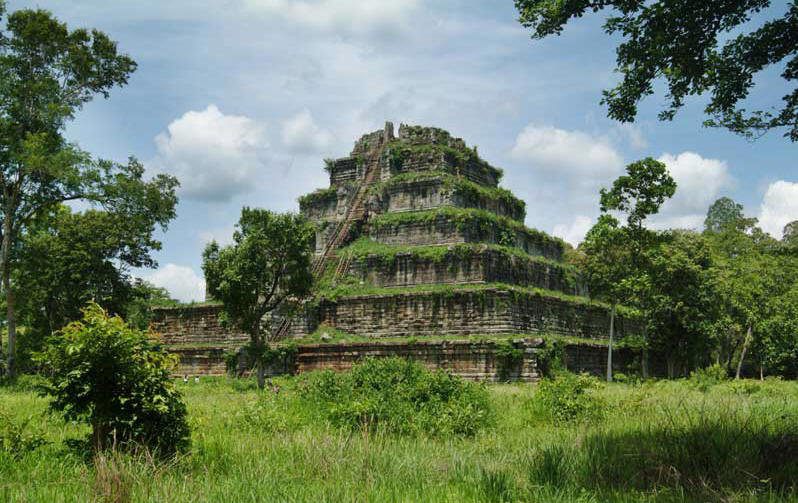
Prasat Thom of Koh Ker temple site Cambodia

The archaeological site of Koh Ker in northern Cambodia contains a seven‑tiered pyramid called Prang which was probably the state temple of Jayavarman IV. Construction of the sanctuary was started in 928 AD. At ground level one, side of the square building measures 62 m (203 ft). The height is 36 m (118 ft). Originally on the top platform stood a huge lingam probably more than 4 m (13 ft) high and having a weight of several tons. Inscriptions say that it was the tallest and most beautiful Shiva-ling-am. The ling-am probably stood in a shrine which some researchers say could have been about 15 m (49 ft) high. On the north side of the pyramid is a steep staircase leading to the top. Concerning the seventh tier some scientists say, this was the platform of the shrine because on its sides beautiful reliefs of Garudas were made.

== Indonesia ==
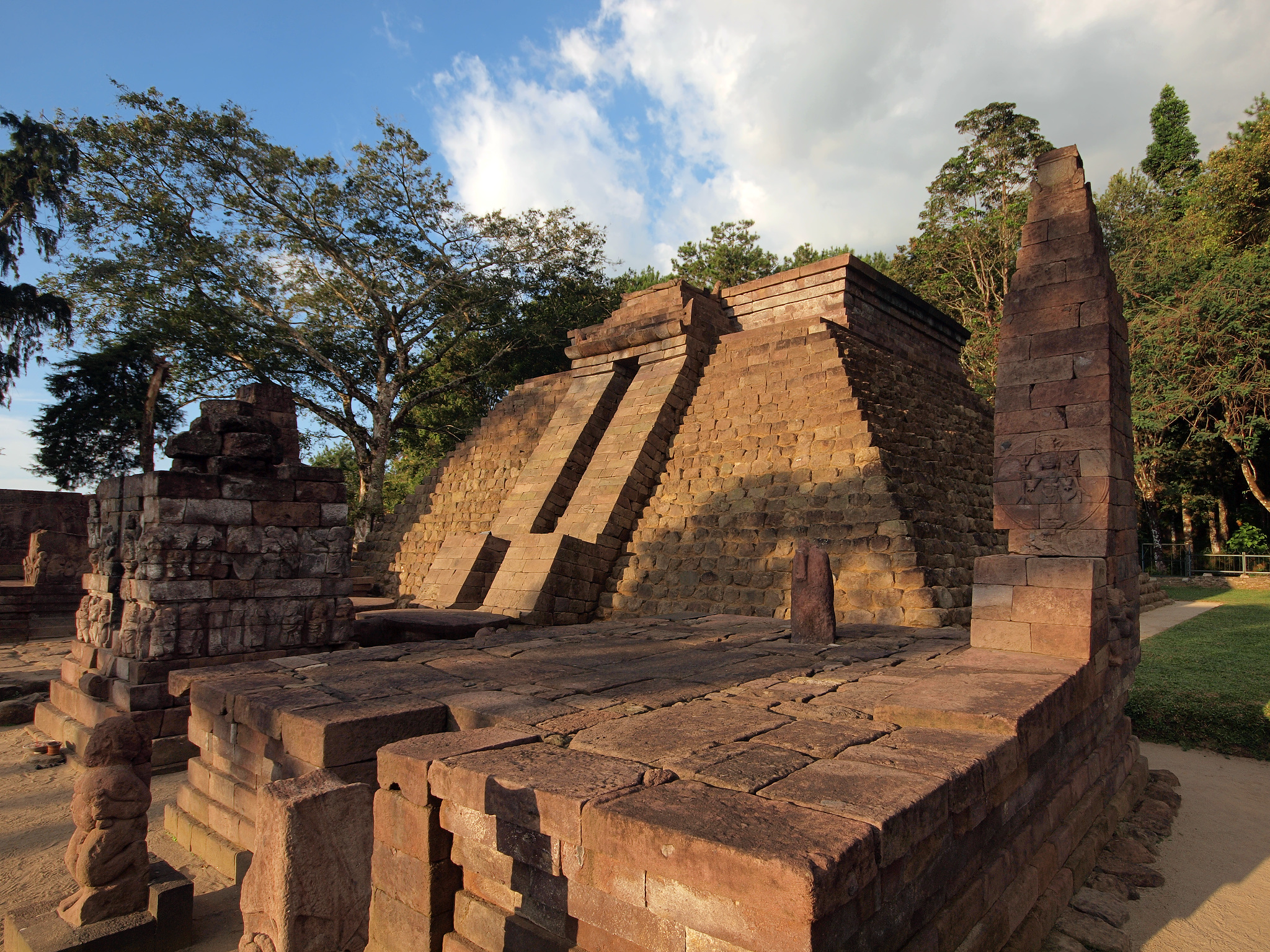
The main pyramid of Sukuh temple

As well as menhirs, stone tables, and stone statues Austronesian megalithic culture in Indonesia also featured earth and stone step pyramid structure, referred to as punden berundak as discovered in Pangguyangan site near Cisolok and in Cipari near Kuningan. The construction of stone pyramids is based on the native beliefs that mountains and high places are the abode for the spirit of the ancestors.

The step pyramid is the basic design of 8th century Borobudur Buddhist monument in Central Java. However the later temples built in Java were influenced by Indian Hindu architecture, as displayed by the towering spires of Prambanan temple. In the 15th century Java during the late Majapahit period saw the revival of Austronesian indigenous elements as displayed by Sukuh temple that somewhat resembles a Mesoamerican pyramid, and also stepped pyramids of Mount Penanggungan.

== Israel ==
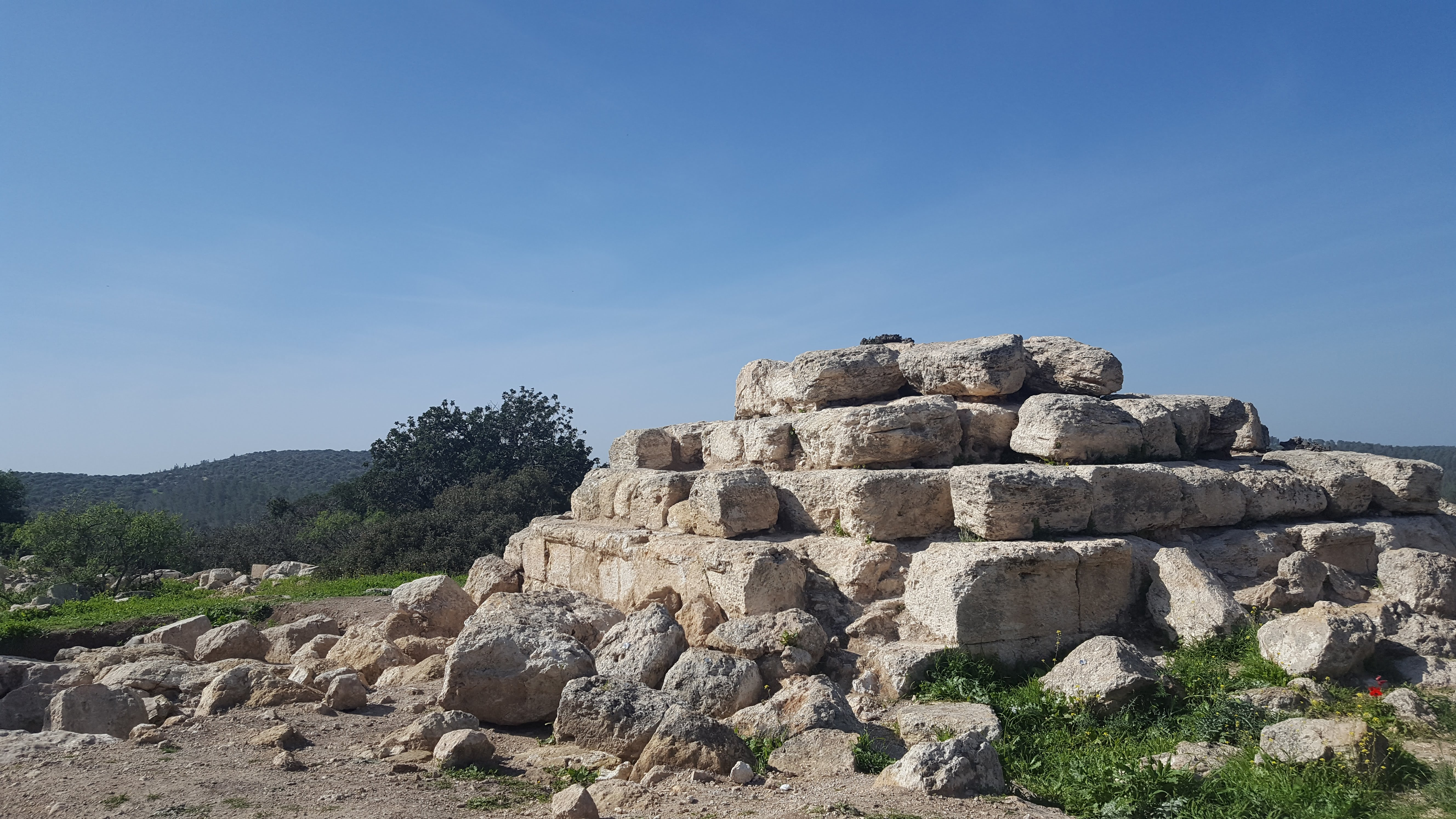
Stepped pyramid at Horvat Midras, Israel

A rare example of a stepped pyramid in Israel can be found at Horvat Midras, an archaeological site that was a Jewish settlement during the Roman era. Situated atop a hill in the Judaean Lowlands in central Israel, the pyramid originally crowned a monumental funerary structure (nefesh). This structure is considered one of the few rural "display tombs" in Second Temple-era Judea, a burial monument designed not only for commemoration but also for visibility and public recognition—characteristics typically associated with urban burial sites, such as those in Jerusalem. The pyramid's position, visible from all directions including up to 6.25 km away and from the nearby road, and its imposing design, suggest it was a prominent status symbol for the wealthy family buried there. This family may have had connections to the Herodian dynasty, which ruled Judaea as a client kingdom under Rome during the first century BCE and CE.

== Japan ==
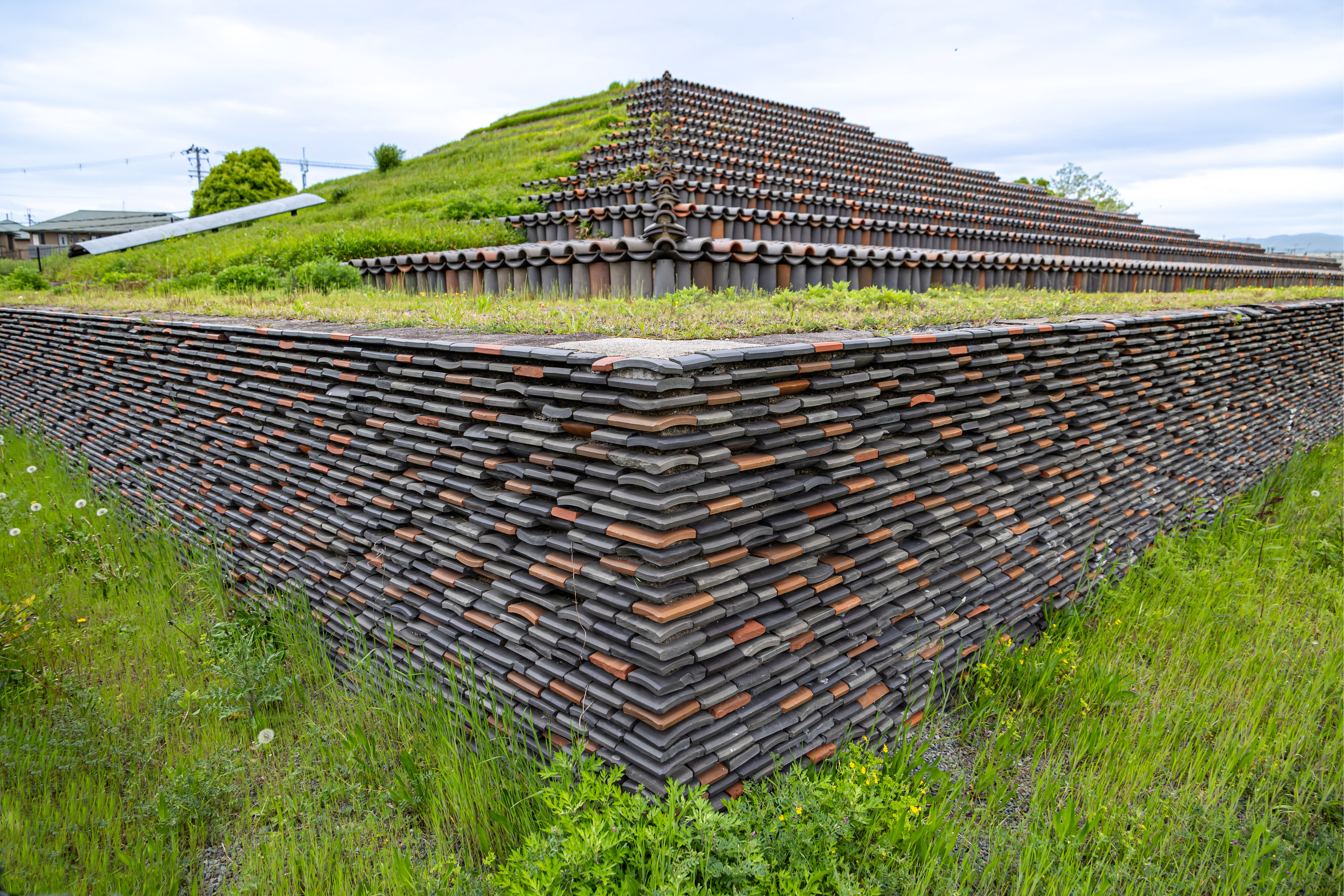
Dotō in Sakai

There are earthwork step pyramids in Japan. Those are Buddhist relics built as pagodas during the Nara period. One of them Dotō are located at the ruins of Onodera Temple in Sakai, Osaka. The earthen pagoda, about 53 meters on each side and about 9 meters height, consists of 13 layers of clay blocks stacked side by side in a stepped pyramid with earth in between. The exposed portion each layer was covered with clay roof tiles, totaling about 60,000 in all. A structure similar to the Dotō is the Zutō in the Takabatake neighborhood of Nara city.

== Kazakhstan ==
In the year 2023, archeologists discovered a 3,400 year old step-pyramid in Kazakhstan, that were used as tombs as well as for religious ceremonies. These pyramids and structures showed ties to the Andronovo culture.

== See also ==
- Setback (architecture)
- Pyramids of Güímar
