= Constantine Alekseevich Bagration =

Georgian prince (1818–1860)

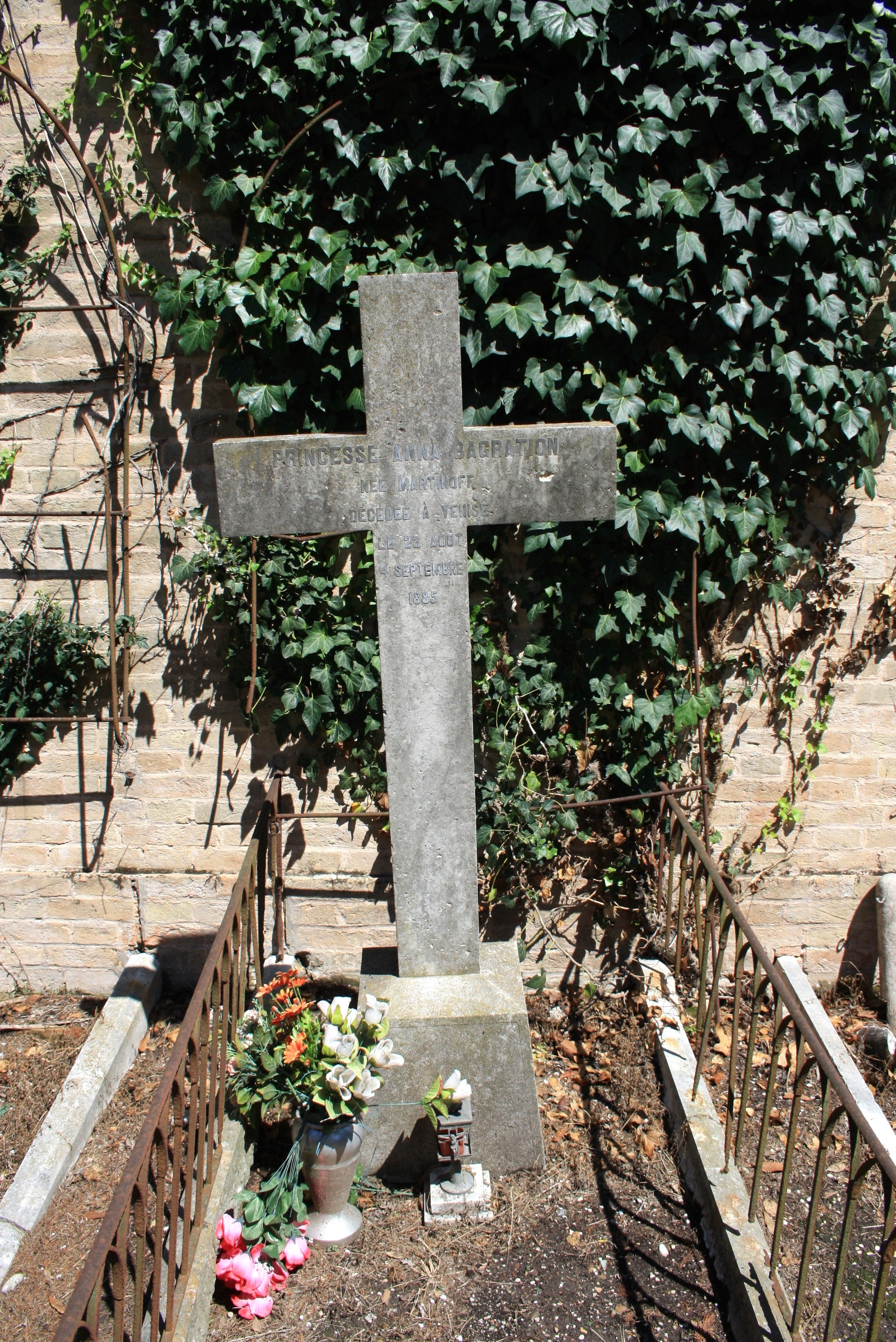
Grave of Anna Bagration, wife of Prince Constantine.

Prince Constantine Alekseevich Bagration (Georgian: კონსტანტინე ალექსის ძე ბაგრატიონი) (1818-1860) was a Georgian royal prince (batonishvili) of the Bagrationi dynasty from House of Mukhrani.

Prince Constantine was son of Prince Aleksy Bagration and Princess Zoya Mavrocordato-Văcărescu.

He was a great-grandson of Prince Alexander of Kartli, son of King Jesse of Kartli.

In 1847 Constantine married Anna Bagration née Nina Savyshna Martinoff (1825-1885). They had no children. She died in Venice and was buried in the San Michele cemetery on Isola di San Michele. On that cemetery is also buried Catherine Bagration, wife of the Georgian prince and general of the Russian imperial army Pyotr Bagration.
