= Anselmo Costadoni =

Italian Camaldolese monk, historian and theologian

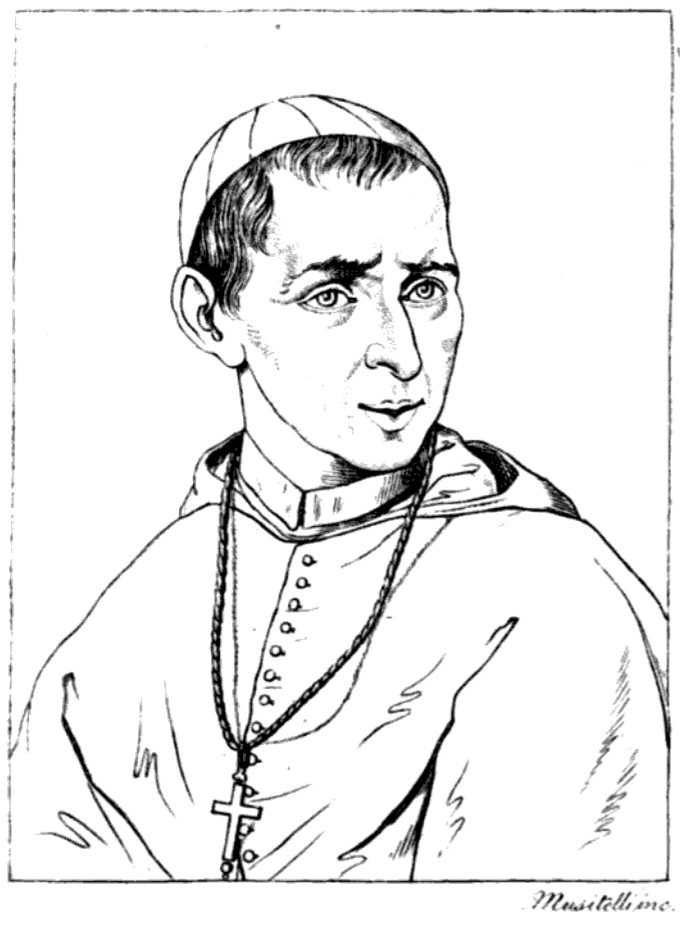
Anselmo Costadoni

Anselmo Costadoni (1714–1785) was an Italian Camaldolese monk, historian and theologian.

== Biography ==
Costadoni was born on 6 October 1714, at Venice and christened Giovanni Domenico. The son of a rich merchant, he sacrificed at an early date his prospects of success in the world and took the religious habit of the Camaldolese monks at the Monastery of St. Michael, situated on the island of Murano in the Venetian lagoon. Here he studied philosophy and theology with more than usual success.

He died on 23 January 1785, in Venice.

== Works ==
At the age of twenty-three, Costadoni revealed his literary ability in a letter (Lettera critica) written in defense of certain Camaldolese writers, who had been attacked by Giusto Fontanini in his "Library of Italian Eloquence".

Costadoni subsequently collaborated for eighteen years with Gian Benedetto Mittarelli of his monastery in the publication of the Annales Camaldulenses ordinis S. Benedicti, ab anno 907 ad annum 1770 (The Annals of the Camaldolese of the Order of St. Benedict, 907-1770), printed in 9 volumes folio (Venice, 1755–73). It follows the plan of Jean Mabillon's Annales ordinis S. Benedicti. (Venice, 1755–73).

Some archæological papers due to his pen, such as Dissertazione sopra il pesce come simbolo degli antichi cristiani, were published in the voluminous collection of historical essays edited by Calogerà, a monk of the same order.

His works also include:

- Avvisi ed istruzioni pratiche intorno ai principali doveri de' regolari (Faenza, 1770; Venice, 1771)
- Lettere consolatorie (Venice, 1775)
- Lettere sopra questione teologiche (Venice, 1773).

Costadoni's unpublished manuscripts were transferred, after his death, to St. Gregory's monastery at Rome, by order of the Camaldolese abbot, Mauro Cappellari (later Pope Gregory XVI).

== Sources ==
- Preto, Paolo (1984). "COSTADONI, Anselmo". Dizionario Biografico degli Italiani (in Italian). Vol. 30: Cosattini–Crispolto. Rome: Istituto dell'Enciclopedia Italiana. ISBN 978-88-12-00032-6.
