= Gian Benedetto Mittarelli =

Italian abbot and monastic historian in the Camaldolese Order

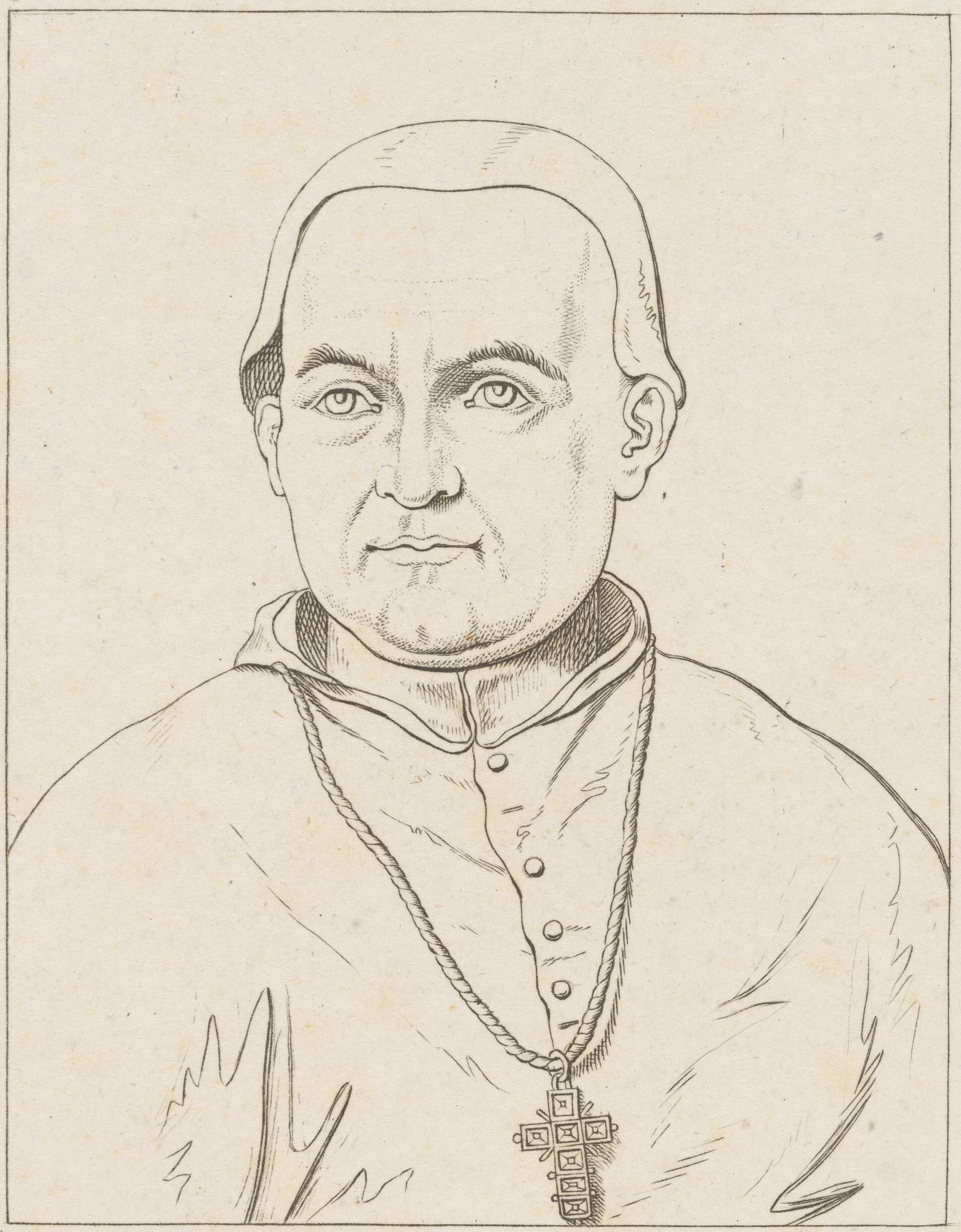
Gian Benedetto Mittarelli

Gian Benedetto Mittarelli (2 September 1707 – 14 August 1777) was an Italian abbot and monastic historian in the Camaldolese Order.

== Early life and education ==
Mittarelli was born in 1707 in Venice and christened Nicola Giacomo.

At the early age of fourteen, Nicola entered the Camaldolese Order at the Monastery of St. Michael, located on the island of Murano in the Venetian Lagoon. Upon his admission to the novitiate of the monastery, he was given the name Gian Benedetto, by which he was known for the rest of his life.

He later studied theology and philosophy at the monasteries of his Order in Florence and Rome. When he completed his studies, he was assigned to teach these subjects to younger members of the Order. However, because he was not attuned to the scholastic method, his superiors sent him to the Monastery of Saint Parisius in Treviso, where he became a confessor and the archivist of the Order.

== Career ==
In 1760 he was elected Abbot of San Michele, and in 1765, Superior General of his Order for the term of five years, during which he resided in Rome. After his term expired, he returned to his monastery in Venice, where he remained as abbot until his death in 1777.

== Writings ==
His monumental work, in the preparation of which he was assisted by his confrères, Anselmo Costadoni and Angelo Calogerà, is the Annales Camaldulenses ordinis S. Benedicti, ab anno 907 ad annum 1770 9 volumes folio (Venice, 1755–73). It follows the plan of Mabillon's Annales ordinis S. Benedicti.

His other works are

- Memorie della vita di San Parisio, e del monastero dei Santi Christina e Parisio di Treviso (Venice, 1748)
- Memorie del monastero della Santa Trinità di Fænza (Fænza, 1749)
- Ad Scriptores rerum Italicarum A. Muratorii accessiones historiæ Faventinæ (Venice, 1771)
- De litteratura Faventinorum (Venice, 1775)
- Bibliotheca codicum manuscriptorum monasterii S. Michaelis Venetiarum prope Murianum una cum Appendice librorum impressorum seculi XV (Venice, 1779; posthumous work)

== Sources ==
- Barzazi, Antonella (2011). "Mittarelli, Giovanni Benedetto". Dizionario Biografico degli Italiani (in Italian). Vol. 75. Rome: Istituto dell'Enciclopedia Italiana.
- Costadoni, Anselmo (1779). "Memorie della vita di d. Giambenedetto Mittarelli veneziano abate esgenerale de' camaldolesi". Nuova raccolta d'opuscoli scientifici e filologici (in Italian). Vol. 33. In Venezia: presso Simone Occhi. pp. 1–64 (of the last numbering).
