= San Michele Cemetery, Venice =

Island cemetery in Venice, Italy

Cimitero di San Michele
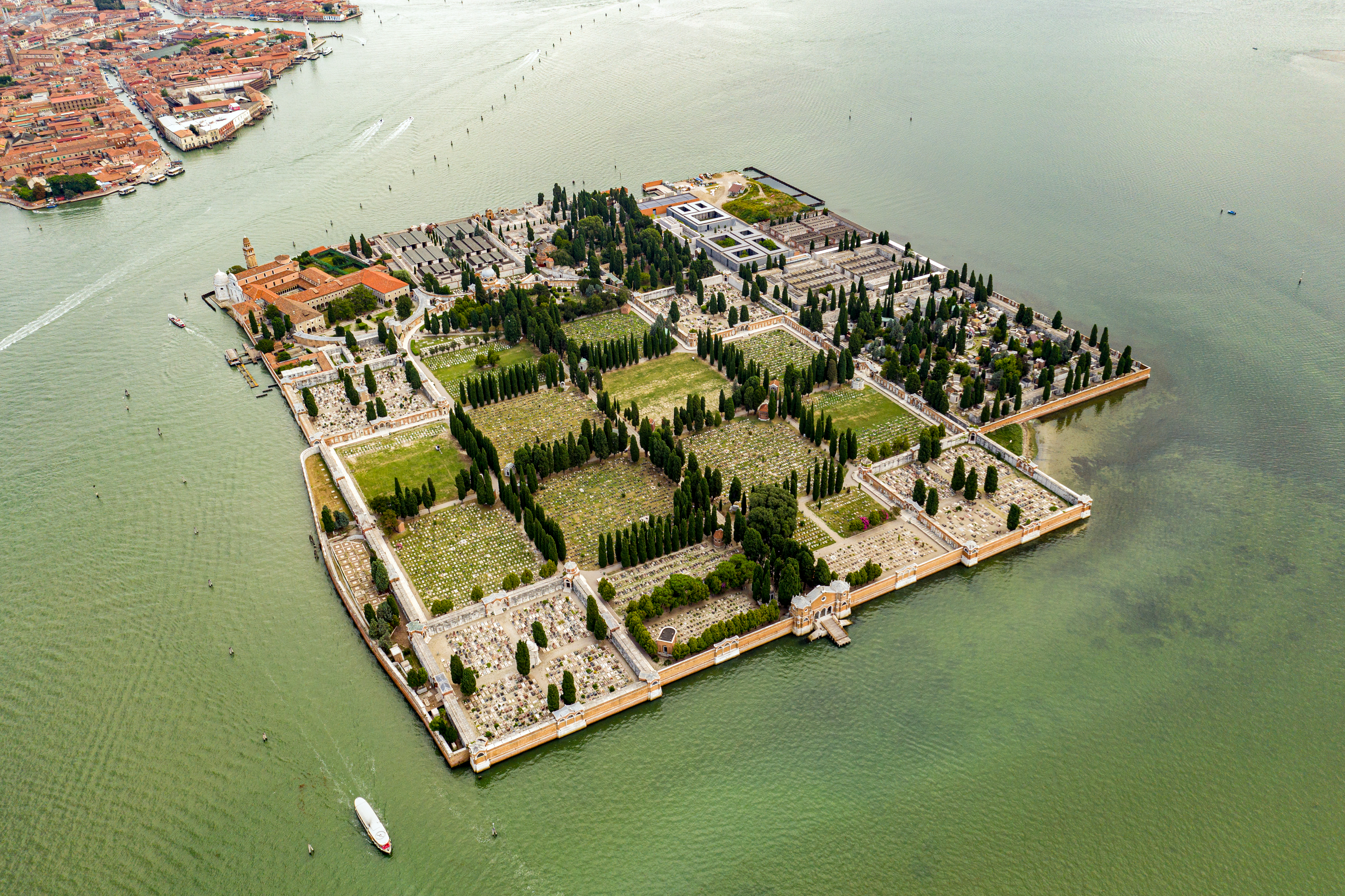
- Aerial view of the island and cemetery
- Interactive map of Cimitero di San Michele

Details
- Established: 1807
- Location: Venice
- Country: Italy
- Type: Multidenominational Christian, predominantly Catholic
- Owned by: City of Venice
- Website: Official website

The San Michele Cemetery (Italian: Il cimitero di San Michele) has been Venice's principal cemetery since its creation in 1807. The cemetery is located on the island of Isola di San Michele between Venice and Murano. In addition to the main consecrated Catholic burial ground, there are separate Protestant and Eastern Orthodox sections catering to non-Catholics. The Jewish cemetery of Venice, however, is located on the island of Lido. Both the cemetery and the island are named after the church of San Michele in Isola built in the 15th century on the island, dedicated to Saint Michael the Archangel.

== History and details ==
The idea of relocating burial grounds outside of the city center originates from the Edict of Saint-Cloud, promulgated during French occupation in 1804 by Napoleon, mainly for hygiene reasons after intramural burials within church crypts was deemed unsafe. At first, San Cristoforo, designed by Gian Antonio Selva, was selected to become a cemetery. Bodies were carried to the island on special funeral gondolas.

Established in 1807, San Michele has been under continuous use as the main burial ground of Venice for over 200 years. Space is tight, and therefore cemetery management puts graves up for lease for 12 years, recycling communal plots following lease expiration by removing skeletal remains to be transferred to an ossuary. The cemetery had to be expanded several times, including its extension in 1839, when the canal separating the two islands of San Michele and San Cristoforo della Pace was filled in and two islands were joined.

The cemetery contains 7 war graves from World War I of officers and seamen of the British merchant and Royal Navy.

Princess Aspasia Manos, the wife of King Alexander of Greece, was initially interred at the Orthodox section of the San Michele cemetery. Her remains were later transferred to the royal cemetery plot in the park of Tatoi Palace near Athens.

In 1889, a crematorium was built in an area granted by the municipality. The original crematory running on gas generator was replaced by two new modern ovens installed in 1995 and 2004.

Other attractions include the Cappella Emiliana chapel. In 2013, the Ministry of Culture declared the San Michele cemetery, along with the Camaldolese monastery and church of San Michele in Isola on the island, to be of historical and artistic cultural heritage.

In 1998, the cemetery was the subject of an expansion competition, won by architect David Chipperfield. The project consisted of the addition of interior courtyards, as well as an ossuary and a service building. These buildings were completed in 2017. A third phase includes an extension of the island with gardens and funerary monuments.

== The Protestant section ==
The Protestant section of San Michele is known as "Reparto Evangelico" in Italian. It is owned by Venice City Council and operated by three Protestant denominational bodies present in Venice, namely the Waldensian Evangelical Church, the Anglican Church and the Evangelical Lutheran Church in Italy. Although the main Catholic burial ground started operating in the early 1800s, Protestant burials took place later at its current dedicated plot (Recinto XV). The Protestant section is surrounded on all four sides by a brick wall, with access via an iron gate linking it with the Catholic Cemetery. There have been around 600 burials in the Protestant section over the last 150 years.

== The Eastern Orthodox section ==
The Greek Orthodox cemetery of San Michele (Italian: Il cimitero greco-ortodosso di San Michele) consists of the graves of the deceased Orthodox Christians, with Greeks and Russian expatriates constituting a majority of burials in the location. Igor Stravinsky and Sergei Diaghilev are among the most prominent Russians interred at the Orthodox section, as well as some members of noble families, such as the Bagrations, the Golitsyns, and the Potemkins-Tauricheskis. The first burial took place in 1816 at the consecrated burial ground for the use of Orthodox Christians (Recinto XIV).

== Notable burials ==
List is sorted in order of the year of death.

- Gasparo Gozzi (1713–1786), Venetian critic and dramatist, and his brother Carlo Gozzi (1720 –1806), Venetian playwright and champion of Commedia dell'arte (Recinto 1°, 329 dx, Quay area)
- Giustina Renier Michiel (1755–1832), Italian noblewoman (Great cloister, Hemicycle)
- Louis Léopold Robert (1794–1835), Swiss painter (Reparto Evangelico, Recinto XV)
- Carl Filtsch (1830–1845), Transylvanian pianist and composer. He was a child prodigy, and student of Frédéric Chopin (Reparto Evangelico, Recinto XV)
- Alessandro Poerio (1802–1848), Italian poet and patriot (Great cloister, between the military burials of the fallen in Russia and the secular hall)
- Christian Doppler (1803–1853), Austrian mathematician and physicist (Great cloister, Hemicycle )
- Catherine Bagration (1783–1857), Russian princess, noblewoman (Reparto Greco-Ortodosso, Recinto XIV)
- Natale Schiavoni (1777–1858), Italian painter and engraver
- Antonio Buzzolla (1815–1871), Italian composer and conductor
- Everdine (Tine) H. Douwes Dekker, née Everdine Hubertina van Wijnbergen (1819-1874), first wife of the Dutch writer Eduard Douwes Dekker, pen name Multatuli (Reparto Evangelico, Recinto XV)
- Friedrich von Nerly (1807–1878), German painter (Reparto Evangelico, Recinto XV)
- Giovanni Battista Meduna (1800–1886), Italian architect
- Giacomo Favretto (1849–1887), Italian painter (Recinto 2°, South porch)
- Eugene Schuyler (1840–1890), American scholar, writer, explorer and diplomat (Reparto Evangelico, Recinto XV)
- Domenico Agostini (1825—1891), Italian Roman Catholic Cardinal and Patriarch of Venice (Cappella dei Canonici)
- Salvador de Iturbide y Marzán (1849–1895), Mexican prince, the grandson of the first emperor of independent Mexico
- Wilhelm Meyer (physician) (1824–1895), Danish physician (Reparto Evangelico, Recinto XV)
- Martín Rico (1833–1908), Spanish painter
- Franz Wickhoff (1853–1909), Austrian art historian (Recinto 1°, Crypt enclosure 326dx)
- Frederick Rolfe (1860–1913), British Catholic writer, eccentric, better known as Baron Corvo (Recinto 7°, Crypt vt 13, row 6a )
- Antonio Dal Zòtto (1841–1918), Italian sculptor (Recinto 20°, Center)
- Pietro Fragiacomo (1856–1922), Italian painter (Recinto 1°, Crypt enclosure n185, right)
- Horatio Brown (1854–1926), Scottish historian
- Sergei Diaghilev (1872–1929), Russian art critic, ballet impresario and founder of the Ballets Russes (Reparto Greco-Ortodosso, Recinto XIV)
- Emma Ciardi (1879–1933), Italian painter (Recinto 7°, Crypt vt 36, row 5/a)
- Teodoro Wolf Ferrari (29 June 1878 – 1945), Italian painter, younger brother of Ermanno Wolf-Ferrari (Reparto Evangelico, Recinto XV)
- Ermanno Wolf-Ferrari (1876–1948), Italian composer and teacher (Reparto Evangelico, Recinto XV)
- Felice Carena (1879–1966), Italian painter (Recinto 5°, Quadr.d n148)
- Igor Stravinsky (1882–1971), Russian composer (Reparto Greco-Ortodosso, Recinto XIV)
- Cesco Baseggio (1897–1971), Italian actor (Recinto 2°, East porch)
- Ezra Pound (1885–1972), American poet and critic (Reparto Evangelico, Recinto XV)
- Franco Basaglia (1924–1980), Italian psychiatrist, neurologist and reformer (Recinto campo, Family mausoleum)
- Vera de Bosset (1889–1982), American dancer and artist, wife of Igor Stravinsky (Reparto Greco-Ortodosso, Recinto XIV)
- Jean Schlumberger (1907–1987), French jewelry designer
- Luigi Nono (1924–1990), Italian composer (Corner of the Friars' field)
- Ashley Clarke (1903–1994), British diplomat (Reparto Evangelico, Recinto XV)
- Joseph Brodsky (1940–1996), Russian-American poet and essayist (Reparto Evangelico, Recinto XV)
- Olga Rudge (1895–1996), American violinist (Reparto Evangelico, Recinto XV)
- Helenio Herrera (1910–1997), Argentine footballer (Reparto Evangelico, Recinto XV)
- Guido Toffoletti (1951–1999), Italian musician
- Zoran Mušič (1909–2005), Slovene painter and printmaker (Recinto 16°, Crypt dx vt4, row 3b)
- Erich Kuby (1910–2005), German journalist, publisher and screenwriter (Reparto Evangelico, Recinto XV)
- Emilio Vedova (1919–2006), Italian painter (Reparto Greco-Ortodosso, Recinto XIV)
- Lauretta Masiero (1927–2010), Italian actress and singer (Recinto 21°, Crypt 56, row 7/i)
- Gennadios (Zervos) (1937–2020), the metropolitan bishop of the Greek Orthodox Archdiocese of Italy (Reparto Greco-Ortodosso, Recinto XIV)
- Roberto Calasso (1941–2021), Italian writer and publisher

== Gallery ==
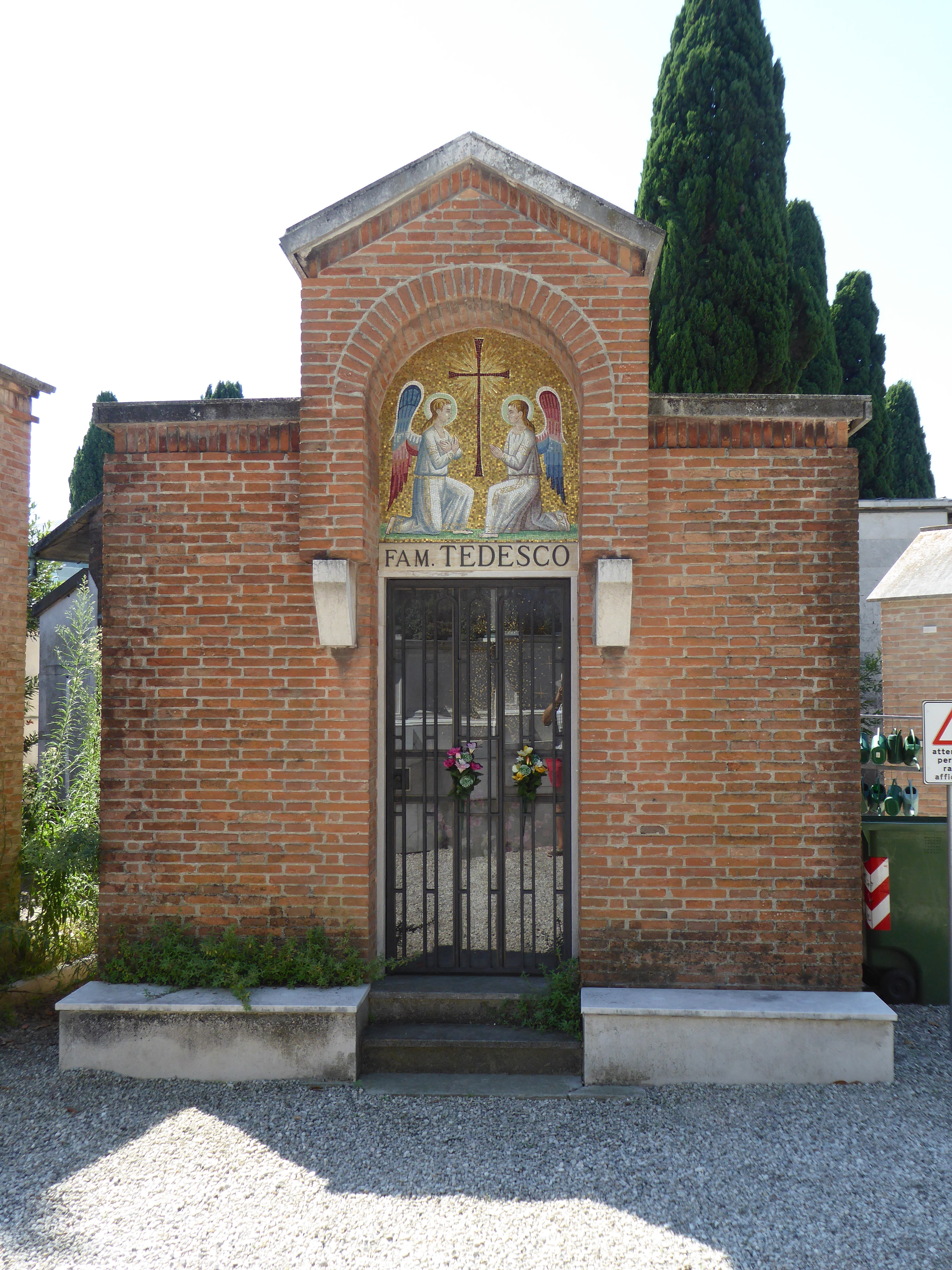

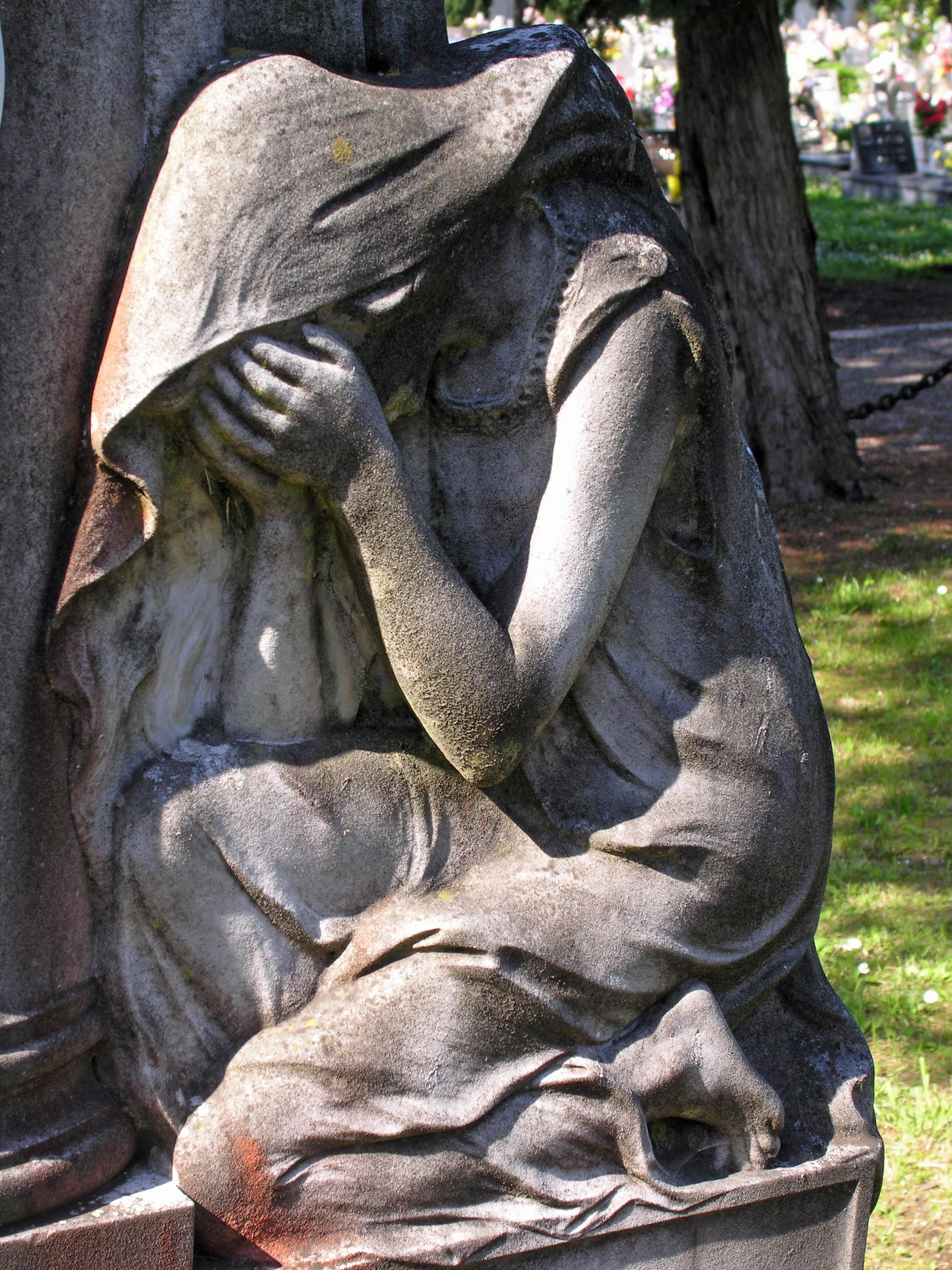

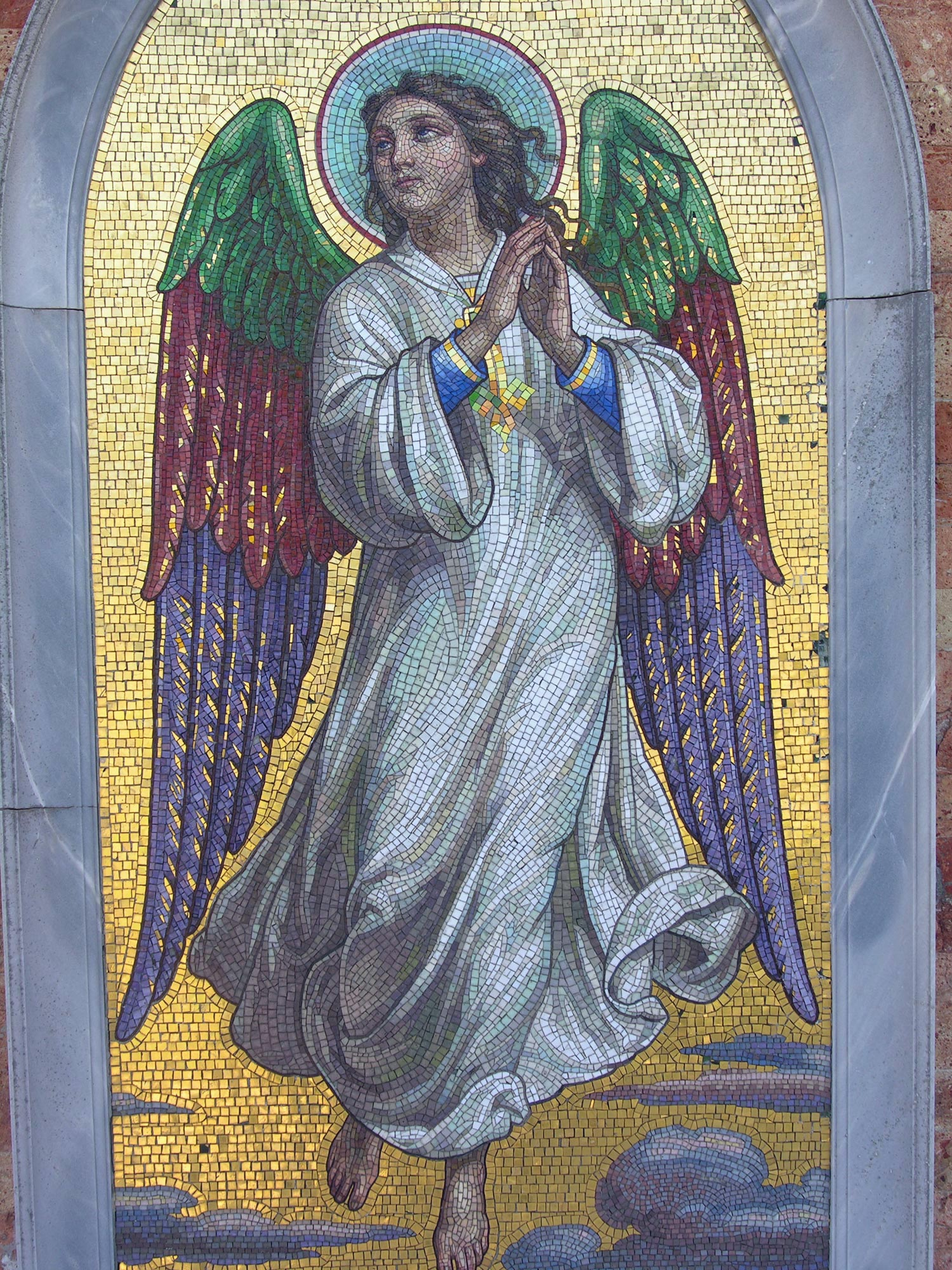

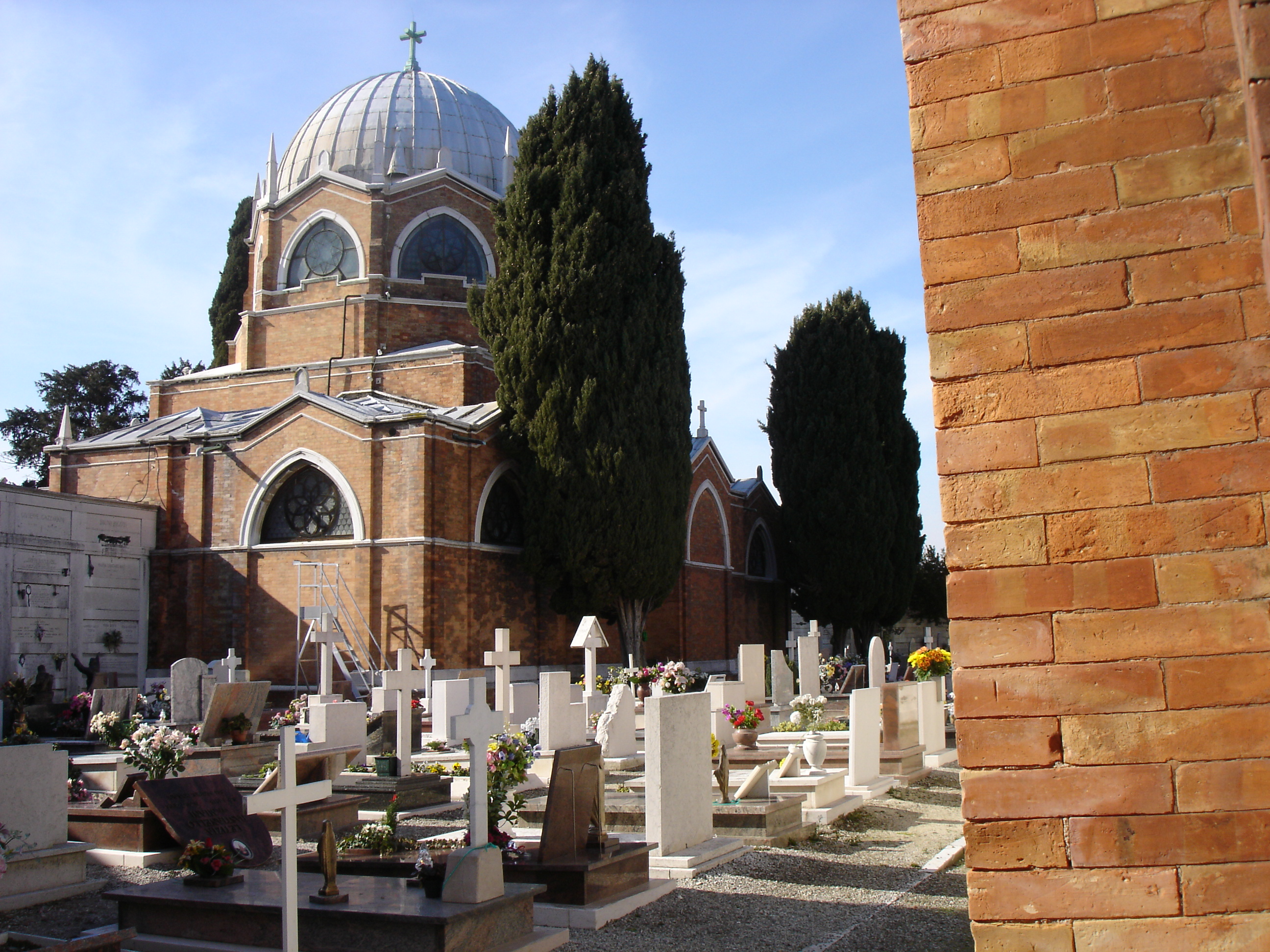

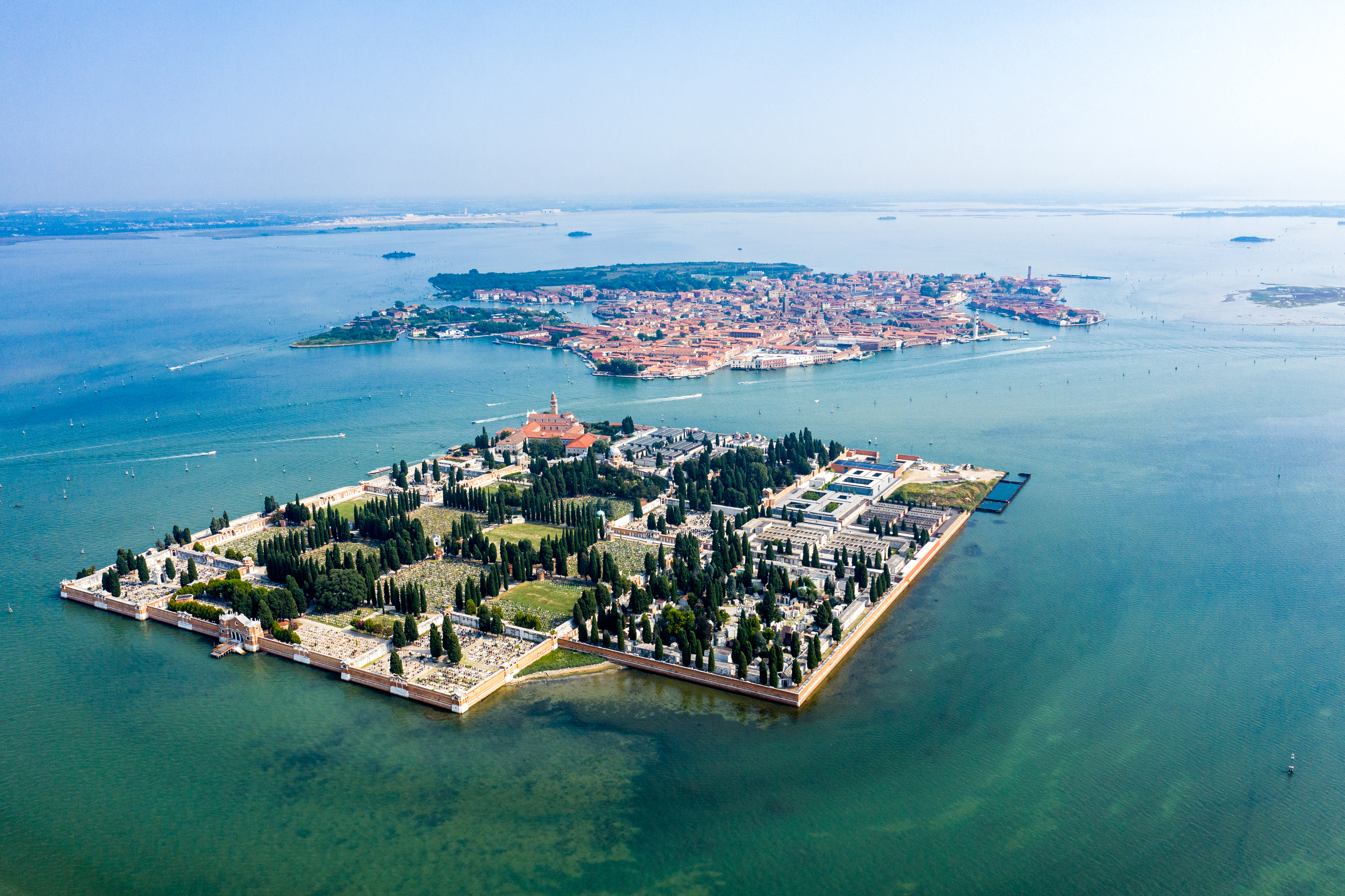

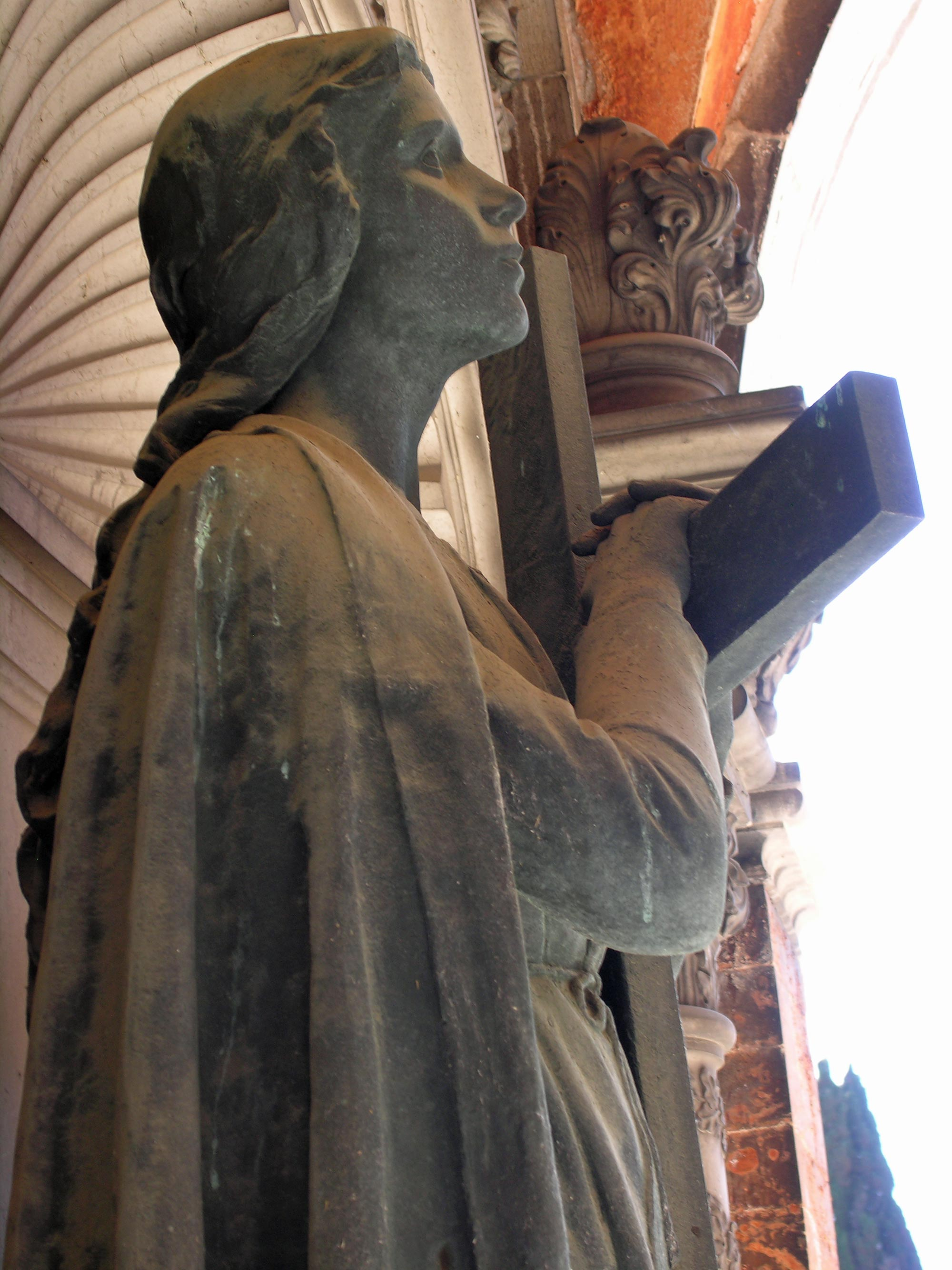

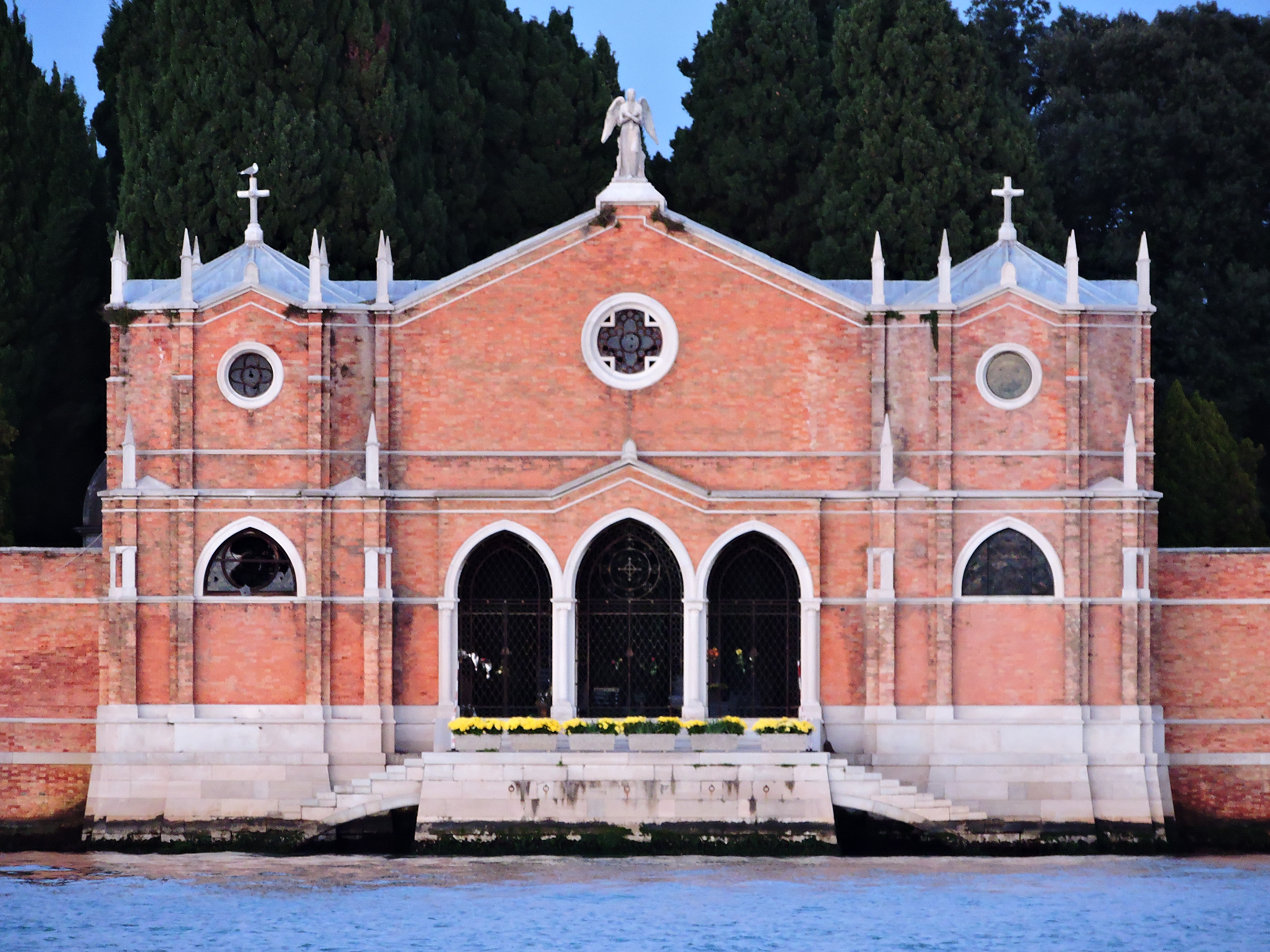

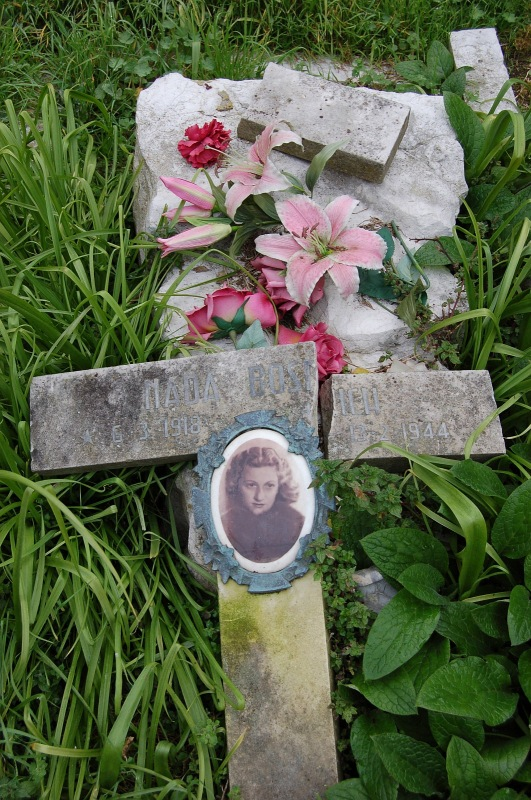

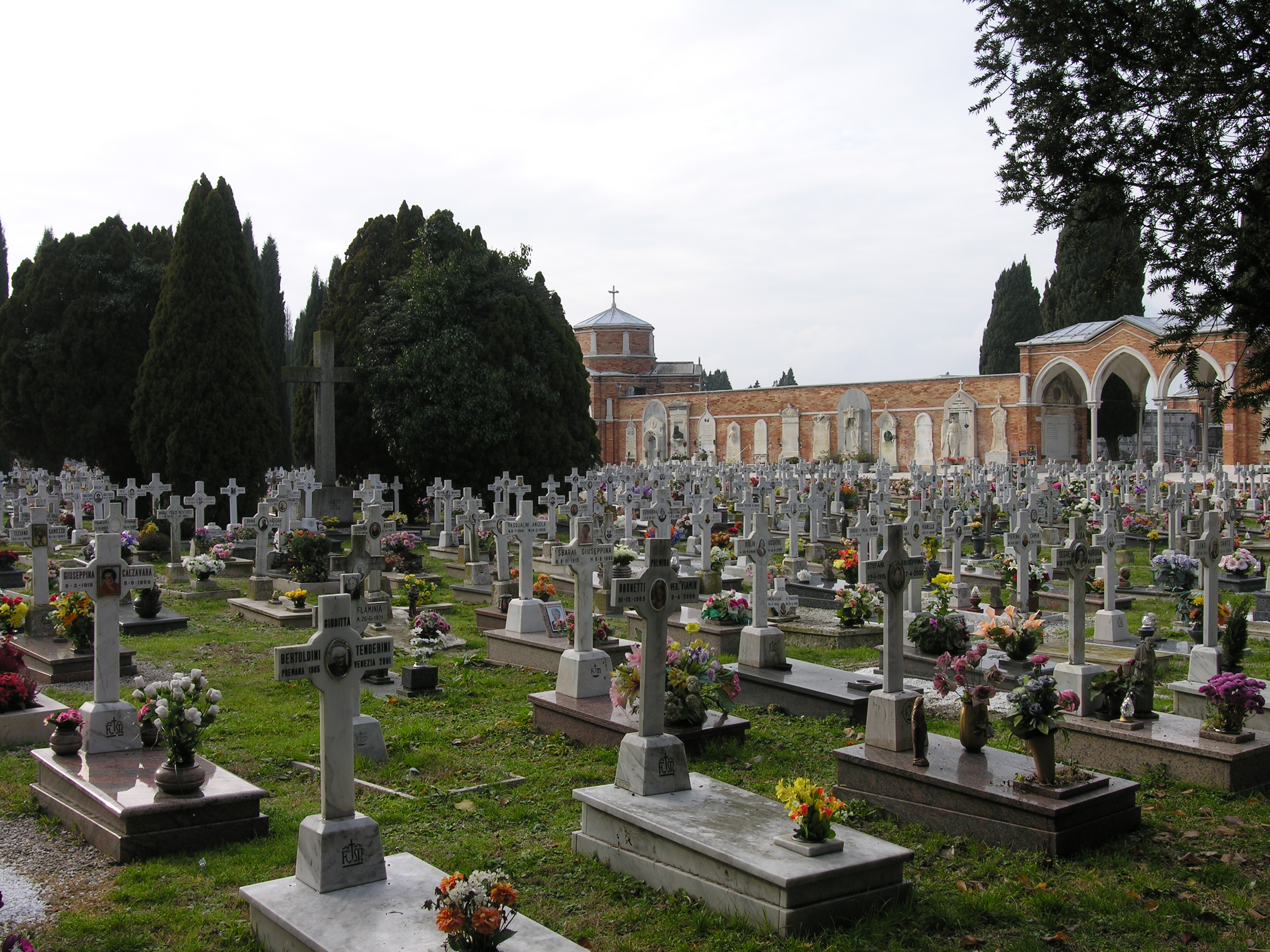

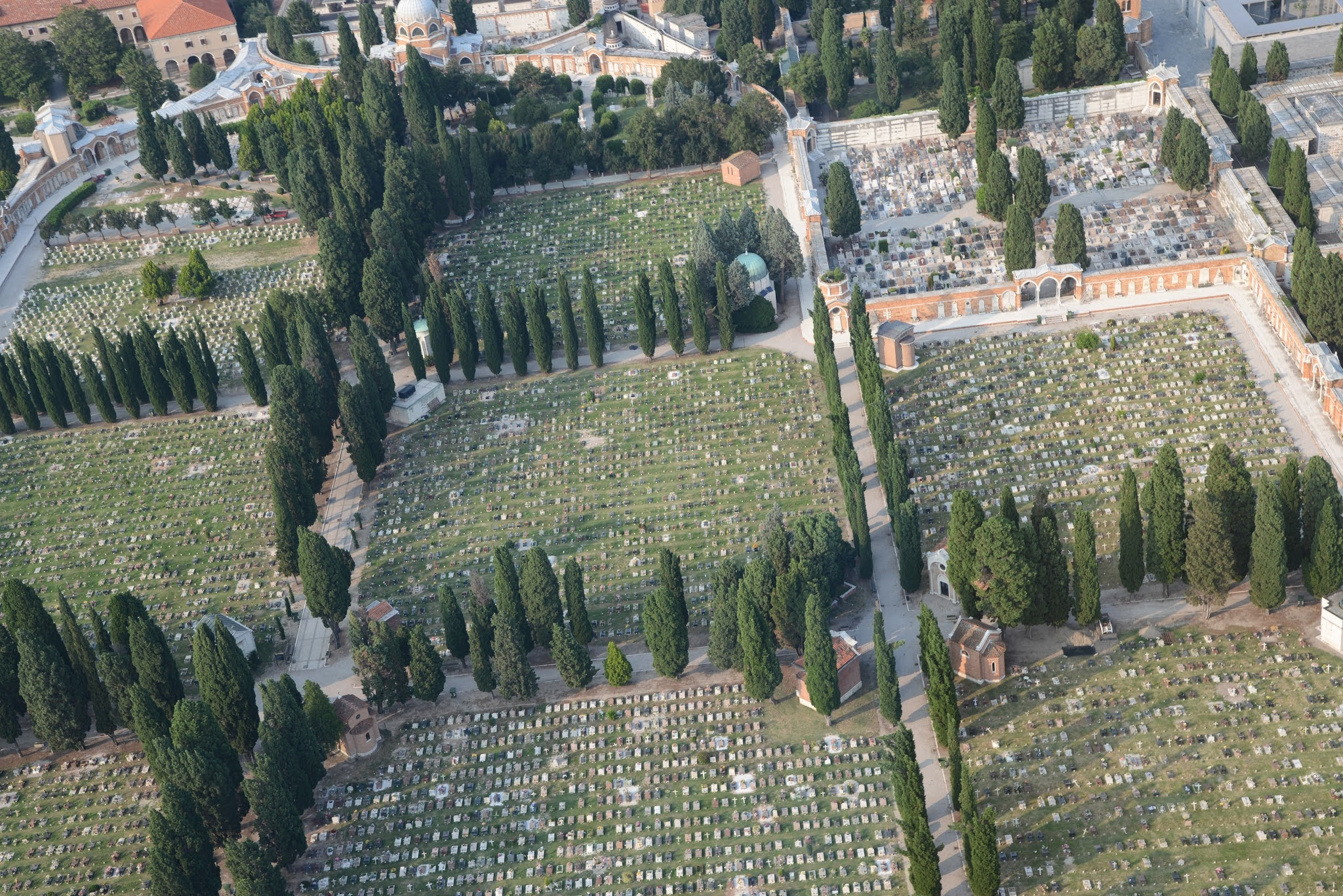

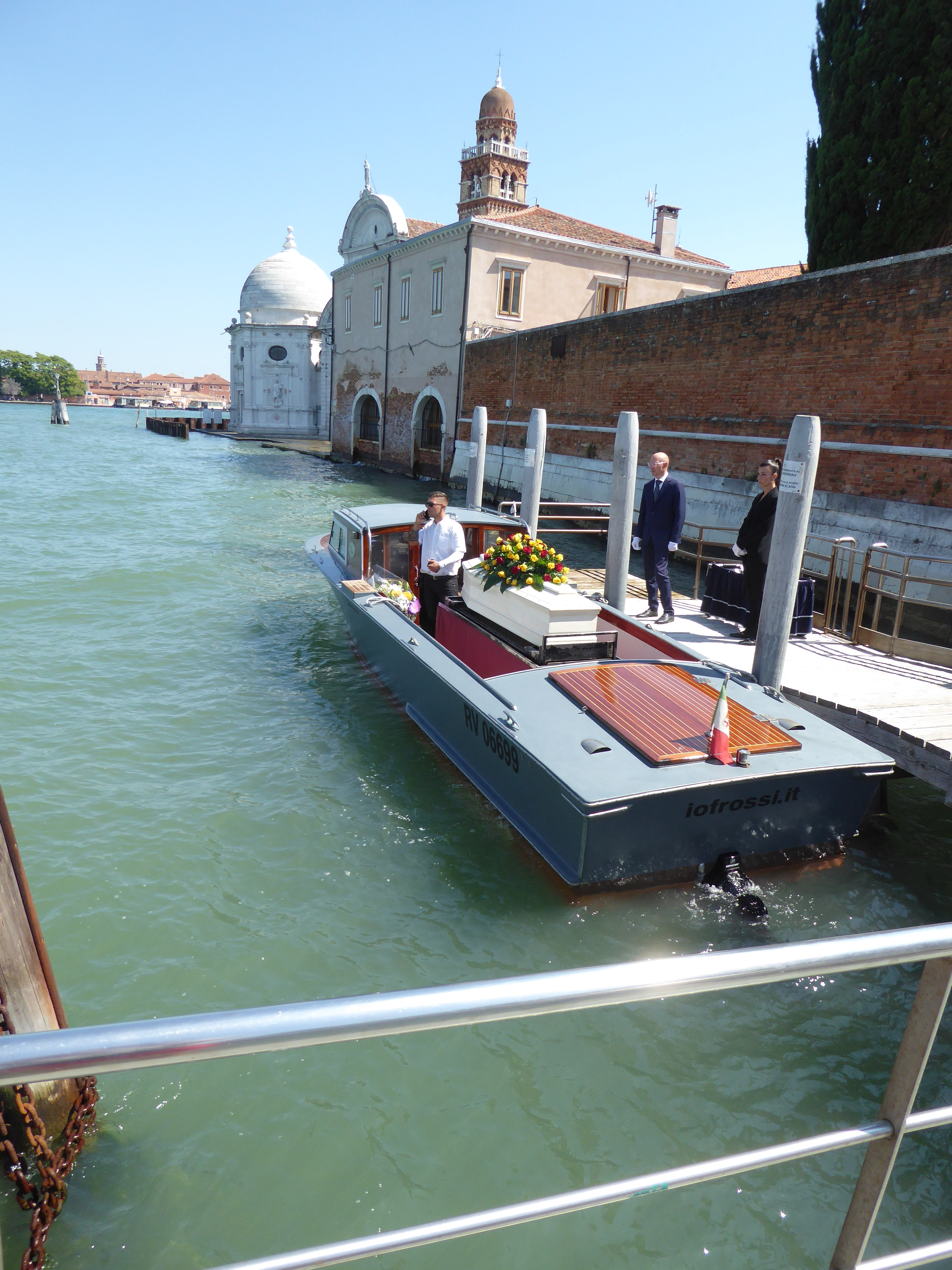

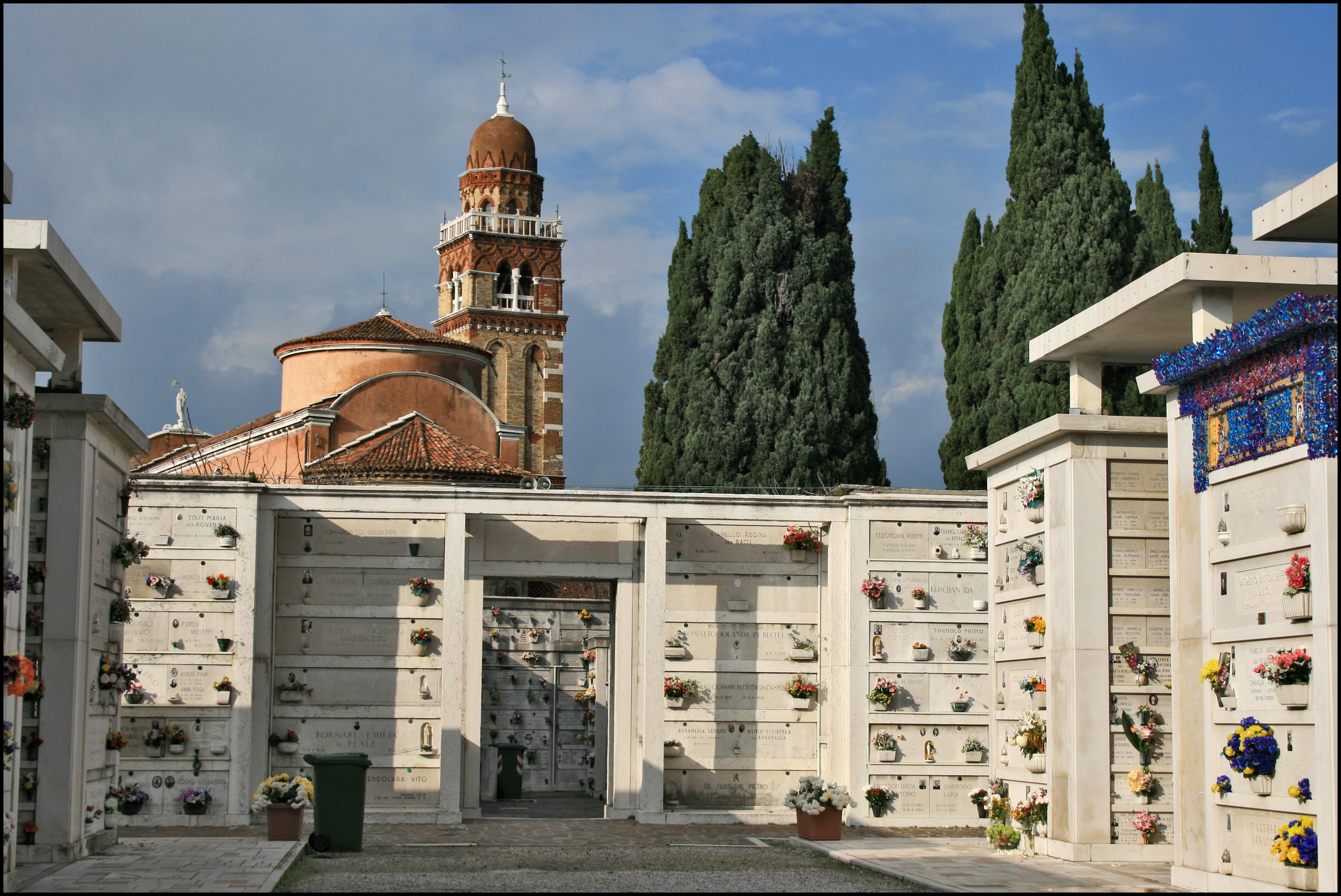

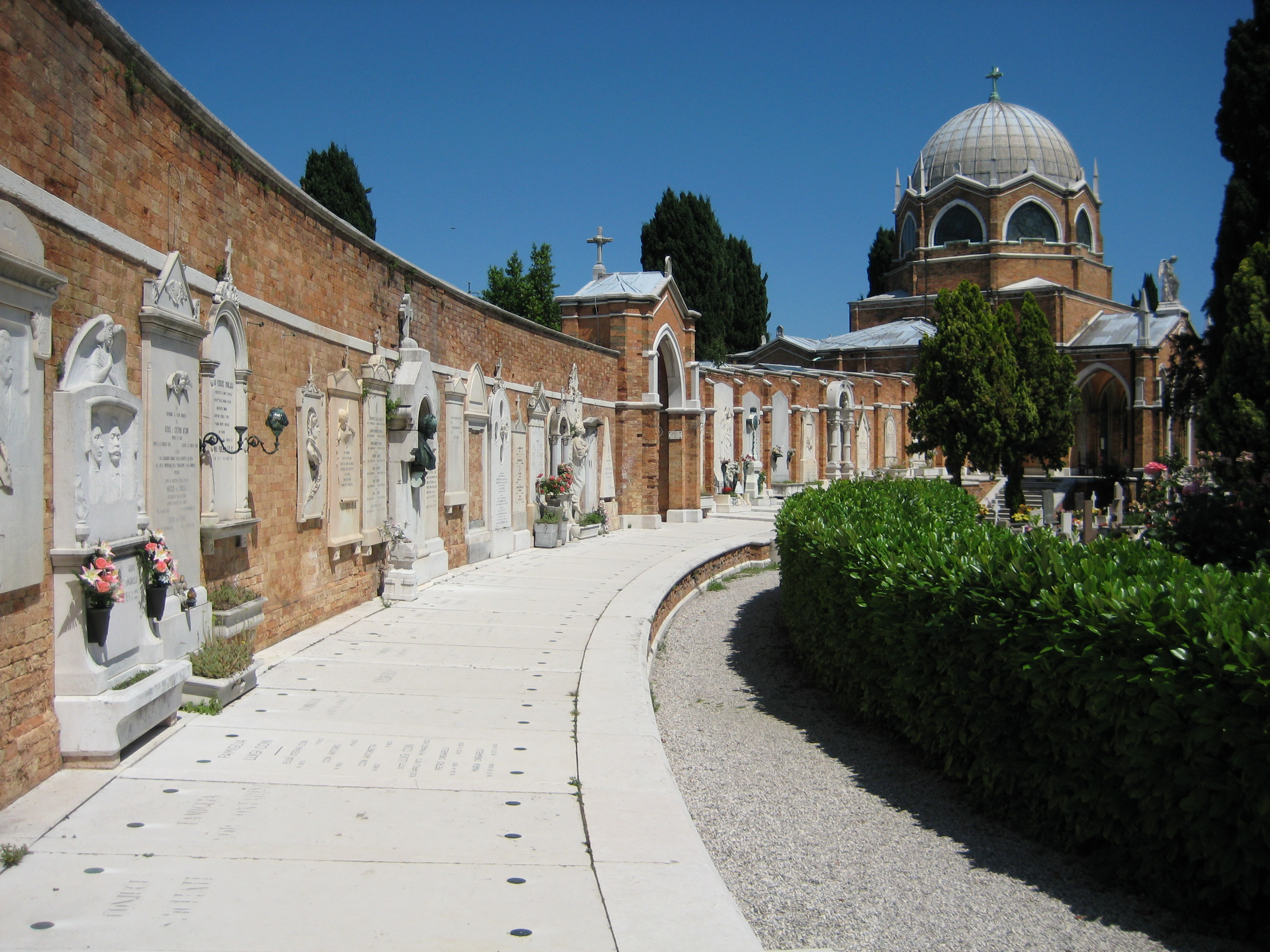

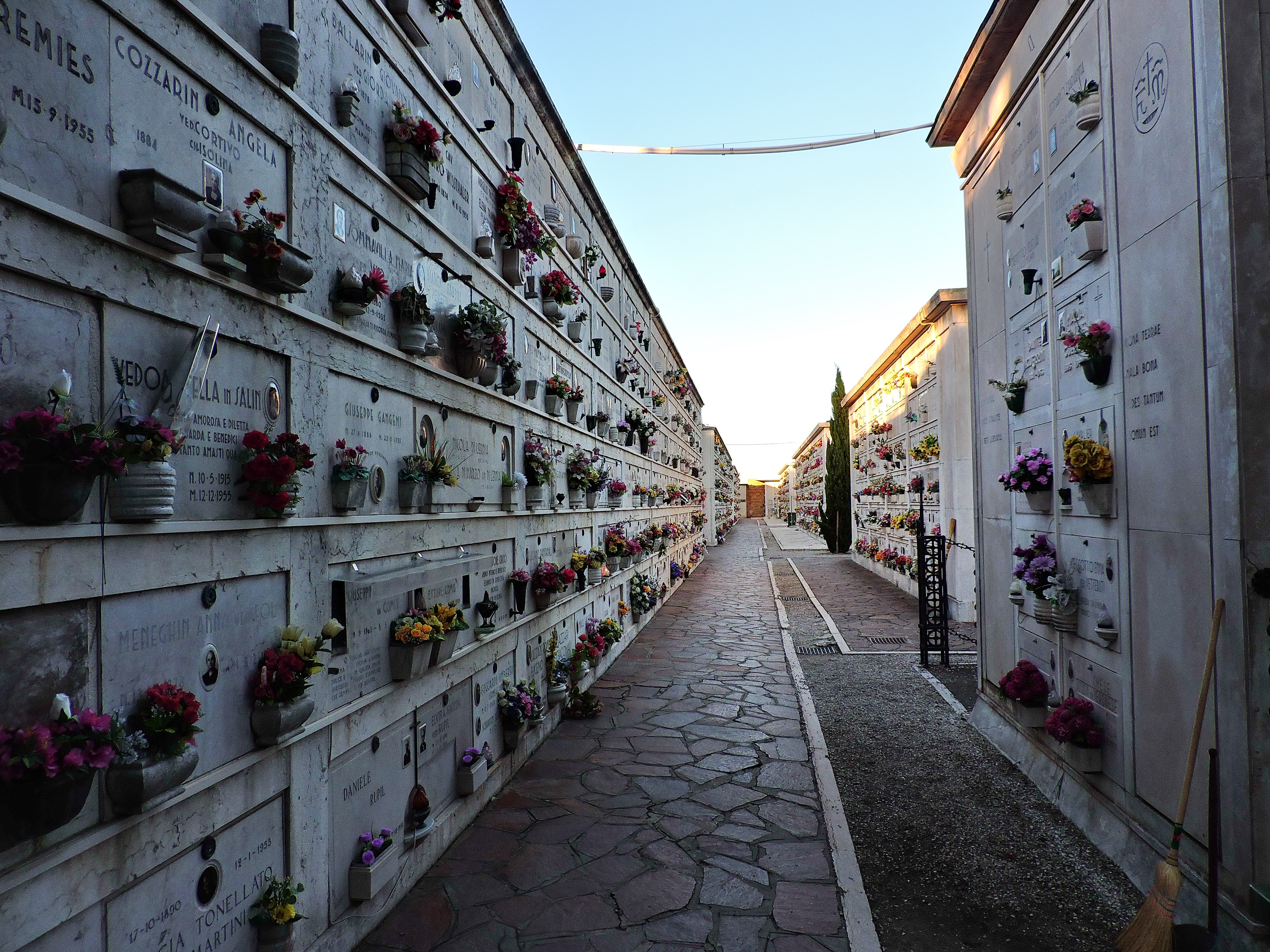

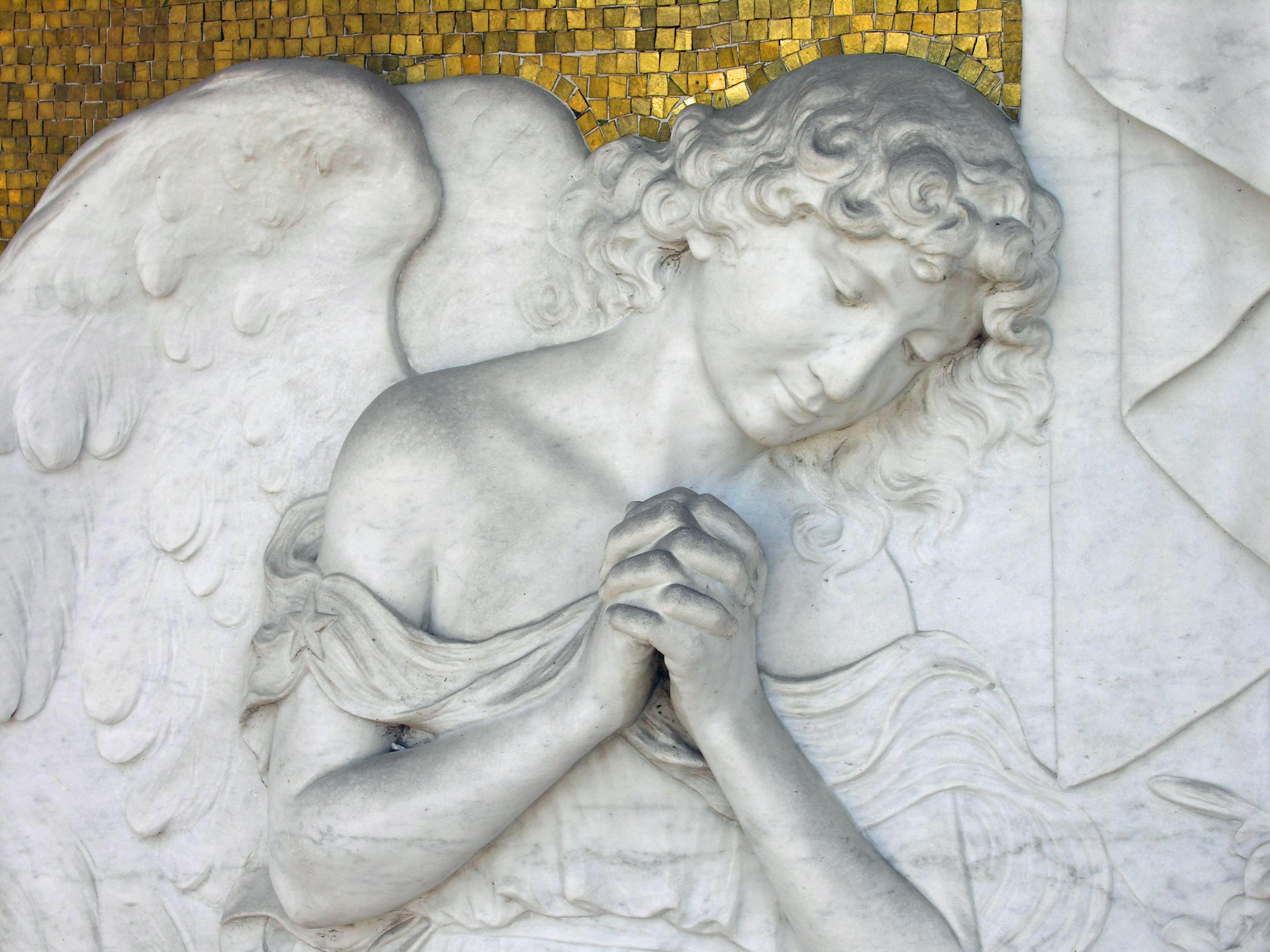

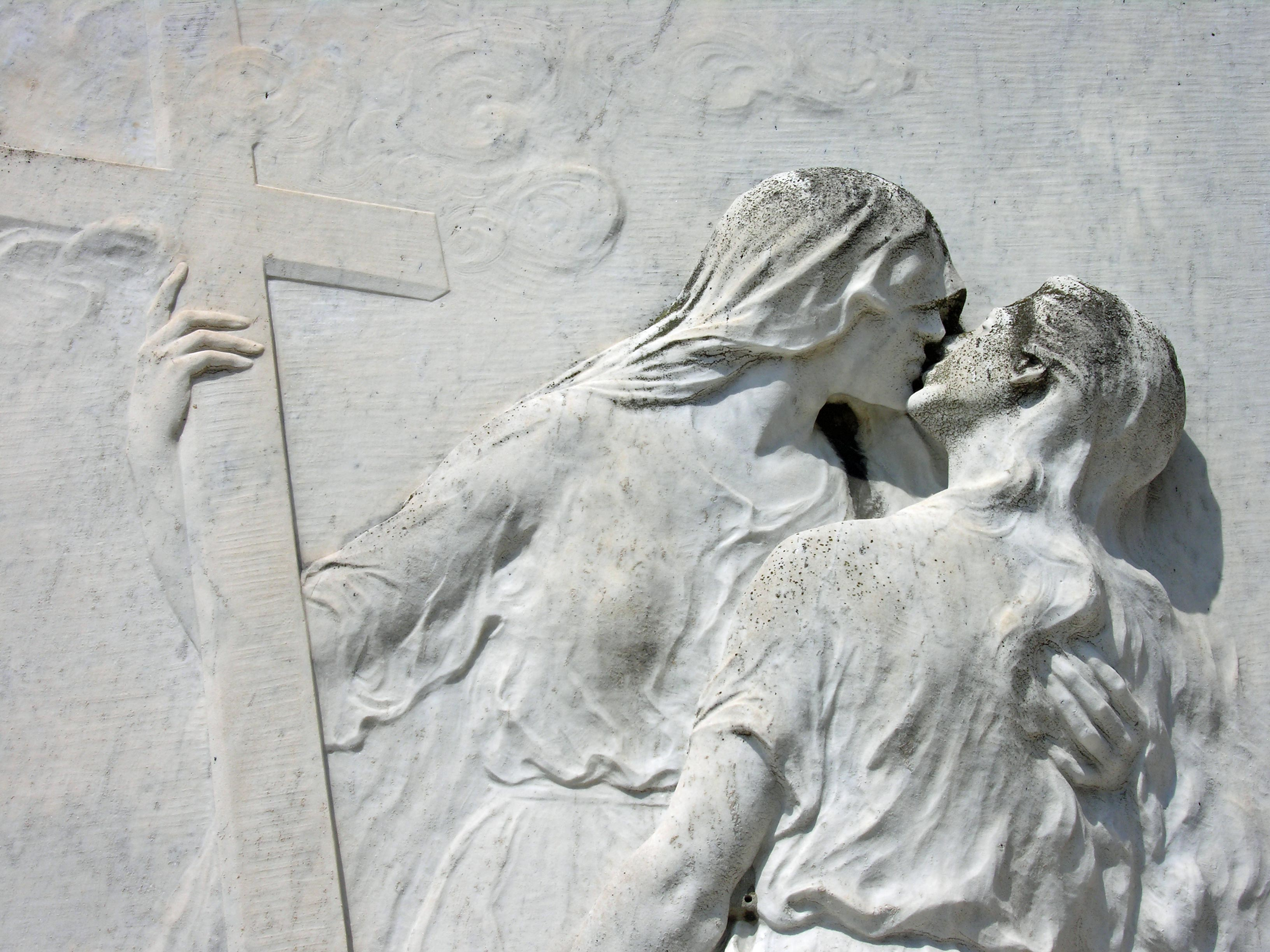

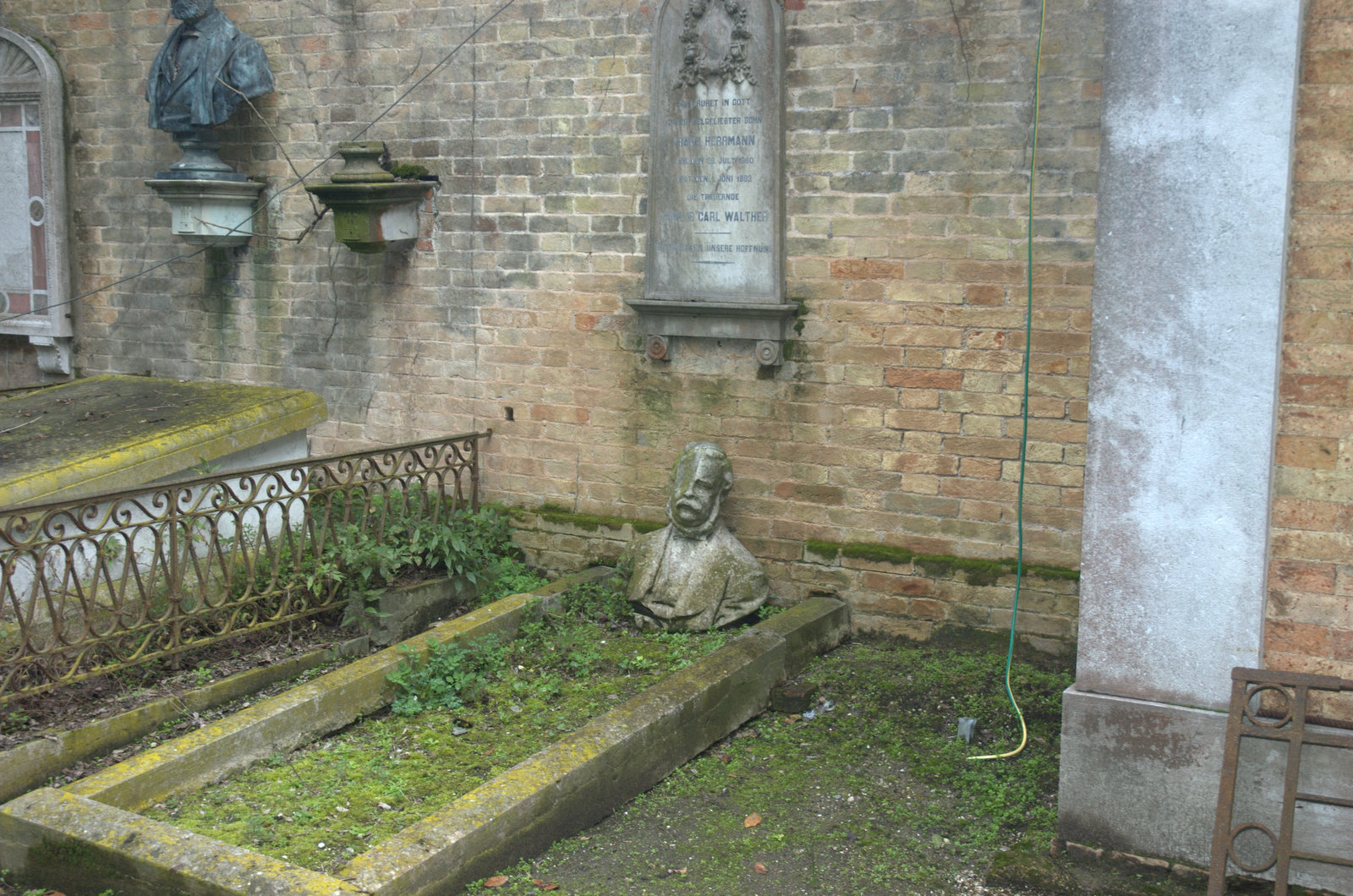

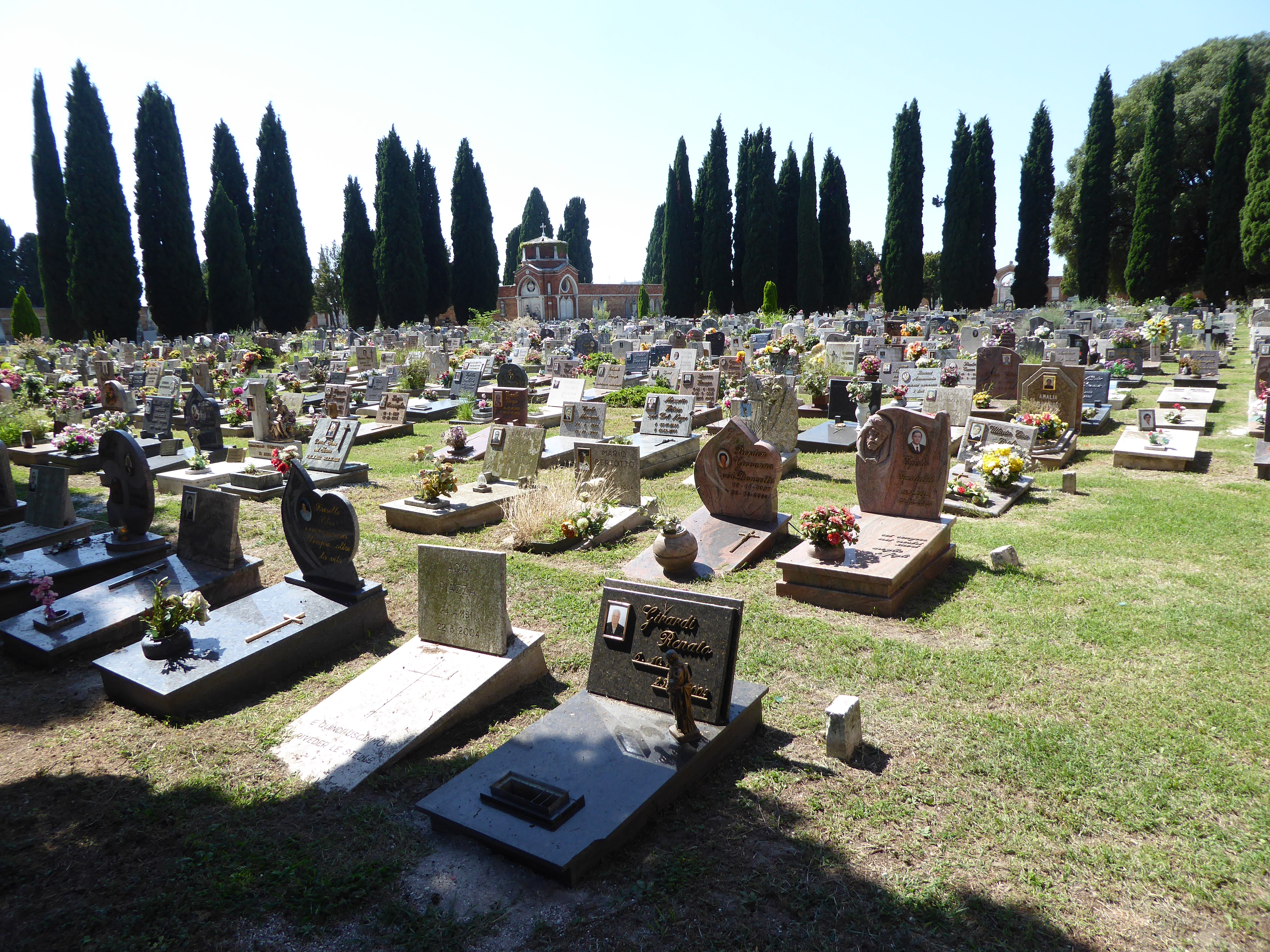

== See also ==
- Isola di San Michele
- San Michele in Isola
- List of burial places of classical musicians
