= Teodoro Wolf Ferrari =

Italian painter (1878–1945)

Teodoro Wolf-Ferrari (29 June 1878 – 27 January 1945) was an Italian painter, mainly depicting landscapes.

== Biography ==
He was born in Venice, the son of Augustus Wolf, a copyist of the works in the Art Gallery of Monaco. His older brother was the Italian composer Ermanno Wolf-Ferrari. Teodoro studied until 1895 at the Academy of Fine Arts of Venice, where he studied with Guglielmo Ciardi and Pietro Fragiacomo. He returned to Monaco in 1896, where he was influenced by the symbolist Arnold Bocklin and he befriended Fritz Erler and Leo Piitz. He continued to exhibit in Monaco and Germany. In 1910, he had a personal exhibition in the Ca' Pesaro of Venice. He also exhibited at the Venice Biennale (since 1912) and Roman Secession (1913 and 1915). His later works depict mainly landscapes. He died in San Zenone degli Ezzelini. he painted a view of Lo spitz di mezzodì da Brusa Adaz a Zolno Alto on display in the Brighton and Hove Museums and Art Galleries.
