= Wilhelm Meyer (physician) =

Danish physician (1824–1895)

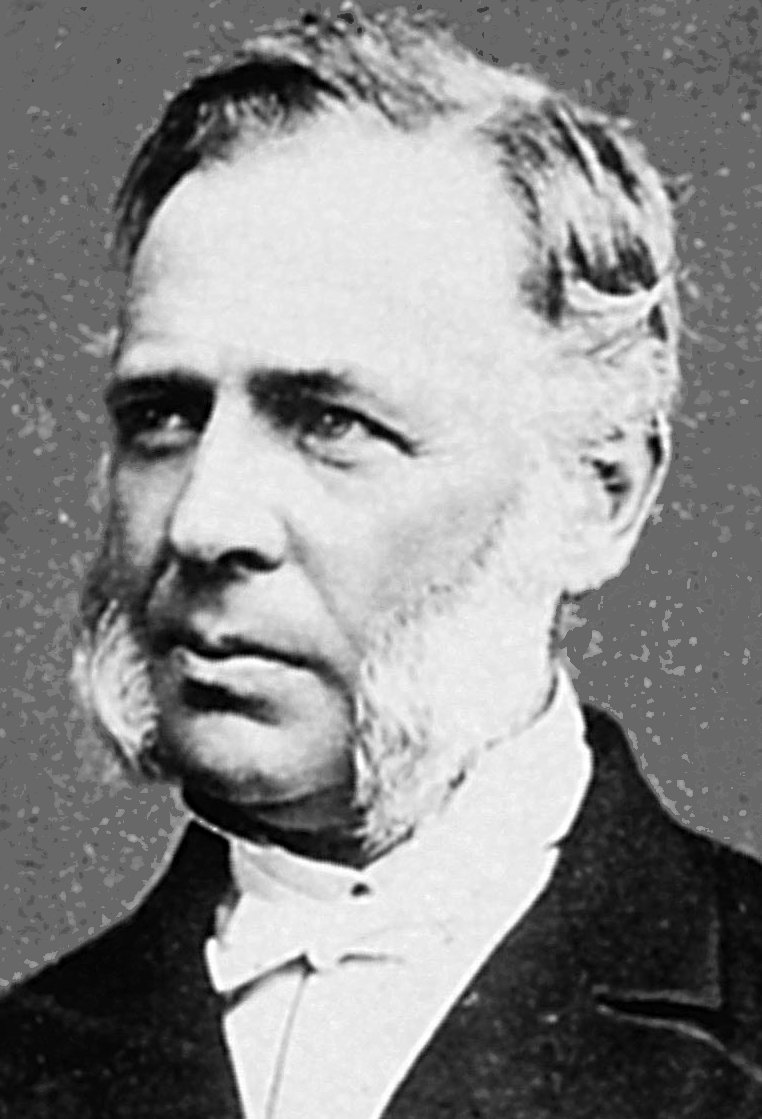
Wilhelm Meyer

The Danish physician Wilhelm Meyer (1824–1895) was the first to describe the clinical condition of nasal obstruction (blocked nose) with chronic mouth breathing, snoring, dull facial expression, and hearing impairment due to adenoid hypertrophy.

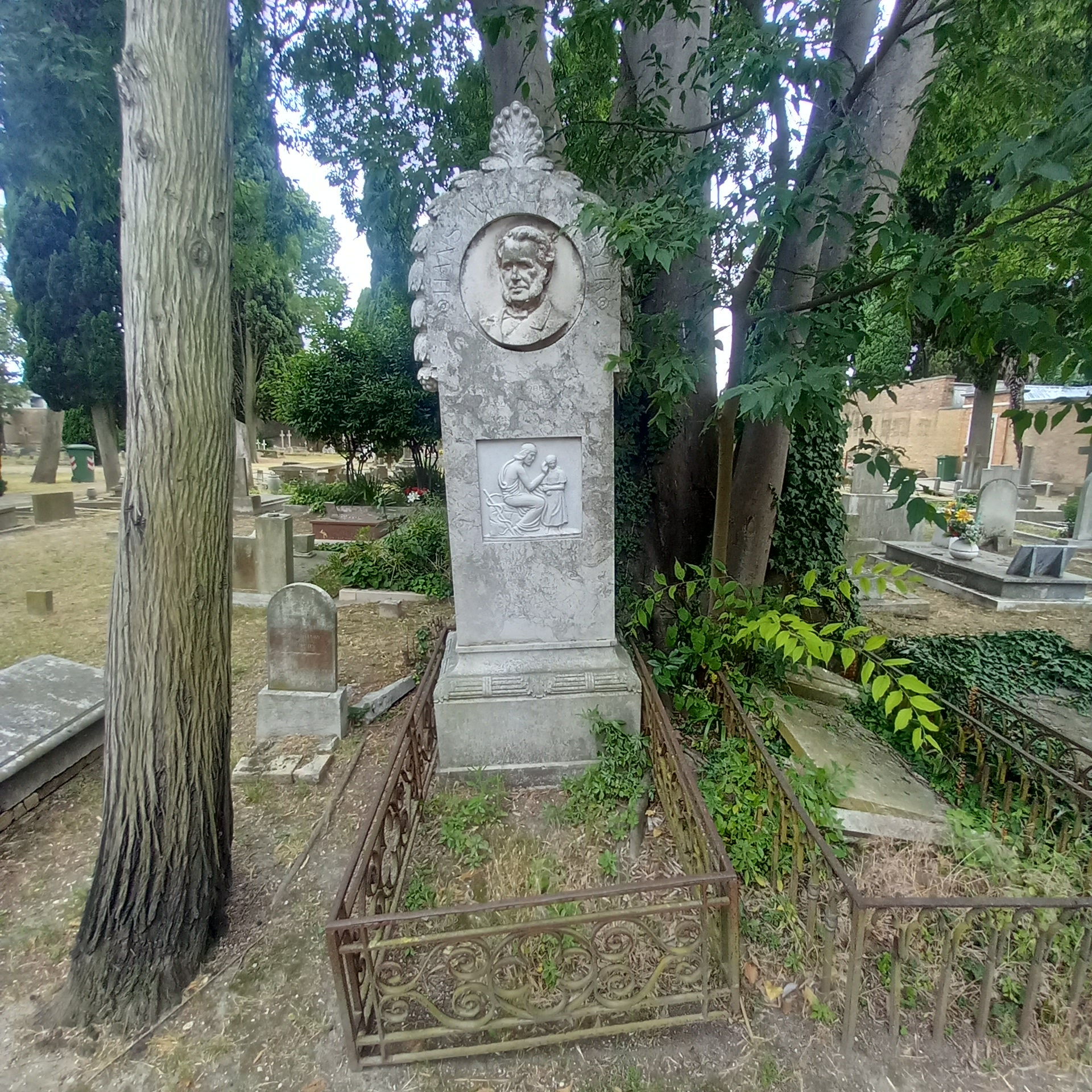
Tomb of Wilhelm Meyer at San Michele Cemetery, Venice

Likewise he suggested how to treat the condition surgically by removing the adenoids with an adenotome. Adenoidectomy is still one of the most frequently performed surgical procedures in children.
