= Pietro Fragiacomo =

Italian painter (1856–1922)

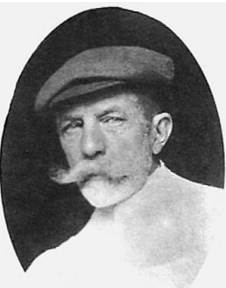
Pietro Fragiacomo (late 1900s)

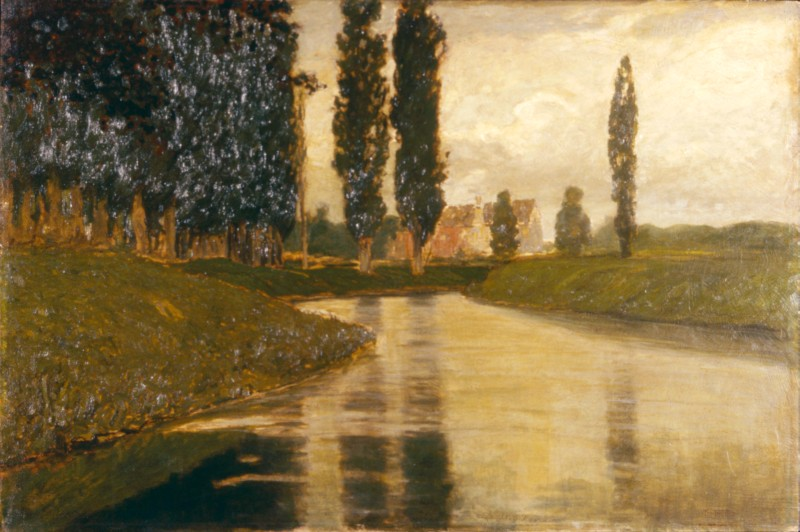
Armonie verdi, 1920 ca. (Fondazione Cariplo)

Pietro Fragiacomo (14 August 1856 – 18 May 1922) was an Italian painter, depicting sea and land-scapes.

== Biography ==
He was born in the mainly Italian town of Pirano d'Istria near Trieste, then part of the Austrian Empire, but lived most of his life in Venice. He only studied for a year (1877) at the Academy of Fine Arts of Venice. He was a close companion, and often worked alongside the painter Giacomo Favretto.

In 1887, he exhibited successfully at the Esposizione di Venezia; and in 1891, he displayed the paintings Pescatori, Silenzio, Sera, Laguna, Case di pescatori in Milan. In 1889, he won a bronze medal at the Universal Exhibition of 1889 in Paris and took part in the Munich International Exhibition of the same year, as well as later editions. In 1895, his canvas Tristezza (Sadness) won awards in Venice, and again the next year, this time in Berlin.

He drew mainly seascapes and cityscapes of Venice, often at night, a thematic also pursued by Mario de Maria. By the turn of the century, his style had acquired Symbolist overtones devoid of a realistic locale. He won the Prince Umberto Prize at the Milan Triennale of 1891 and was a regular participant from 1895 to 1922 at the Venice Biennale, which displayed a solo show of his work in 1910 and a posthumous retrospective in 1924. He died in Venice and was interred at the San Michele cemetery on the Isola di San Michele in Venice.
