= San Michele in Isola =

Catholic church in Venice, Italy

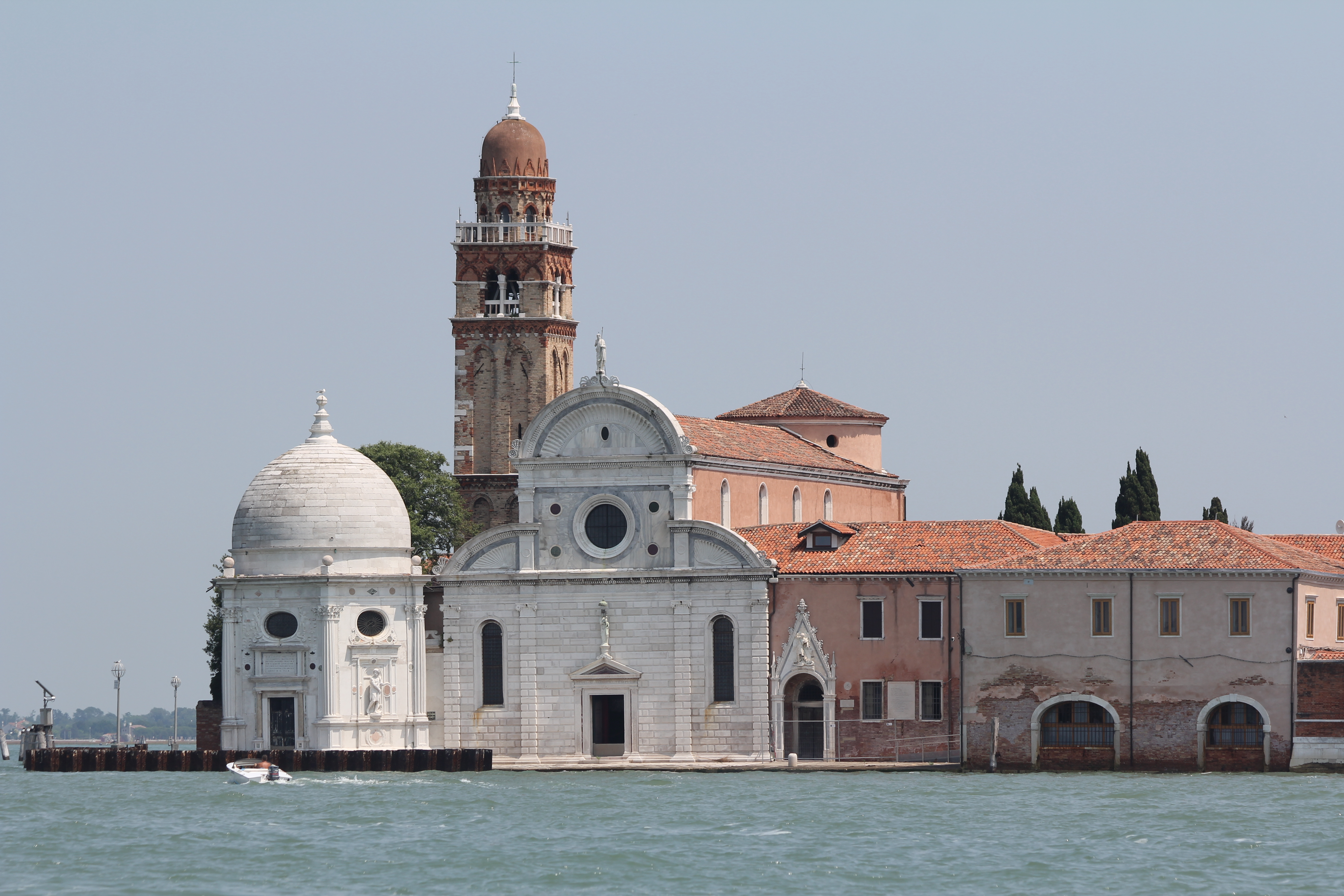
- San Michele in Isola from the west

Religion
- Affiliation: Catholic Church
- Province: Venice

Location
- Location: Venice, Italy
- Interactive map of San Michele in Isola
- Coordinates: 45°26′57″N 12°20′49″E

Architecture
- Completed: 1469

San Michele in Isola is a Catholic church, located on the Isola di San Michele, a small islet sited between Venice and Murano, which once sheltered a Camaldolese monastery (Italian: Monastero di S. Michele di Murano), but now houses the main cemetery of the city. The monastery was mostly demolished in the 19th century, but the church remains, originally rebuilt starting in 1469. The church is dedicated to Saint Michael, the holder of the scales on Judgement Day, a fit guardian of the sleep of the faithful dead. The island cemetery now includes the land of the formerly separate island of San Cristoforo. This church is sometimes referred to as San Michele di Murano, although this islet is separate from islands comprising that town.

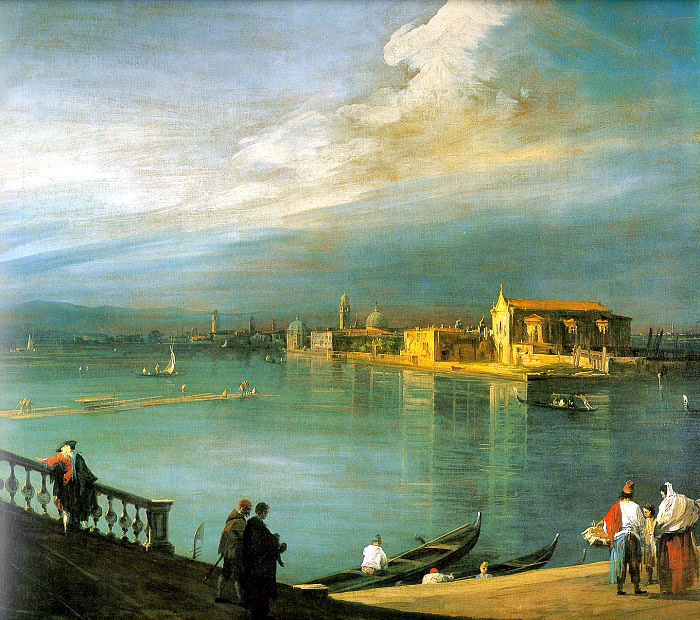
Canaletto, View North from Fondamenta Nuova of Venice of San Cristoforo, then San Michele, with Murano in background (1722)

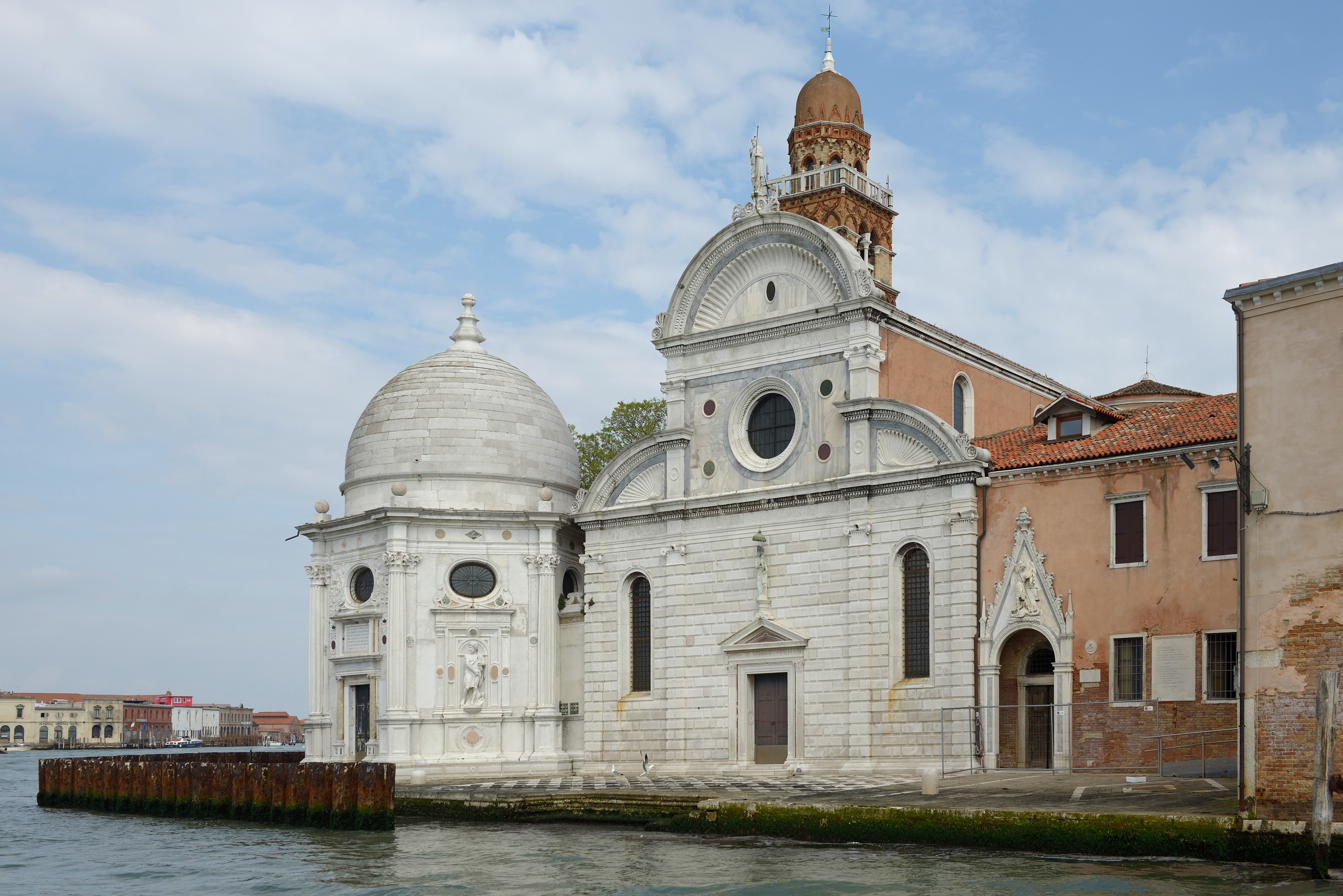
The façade of San Michele in Isola with the Cappella Emiliani

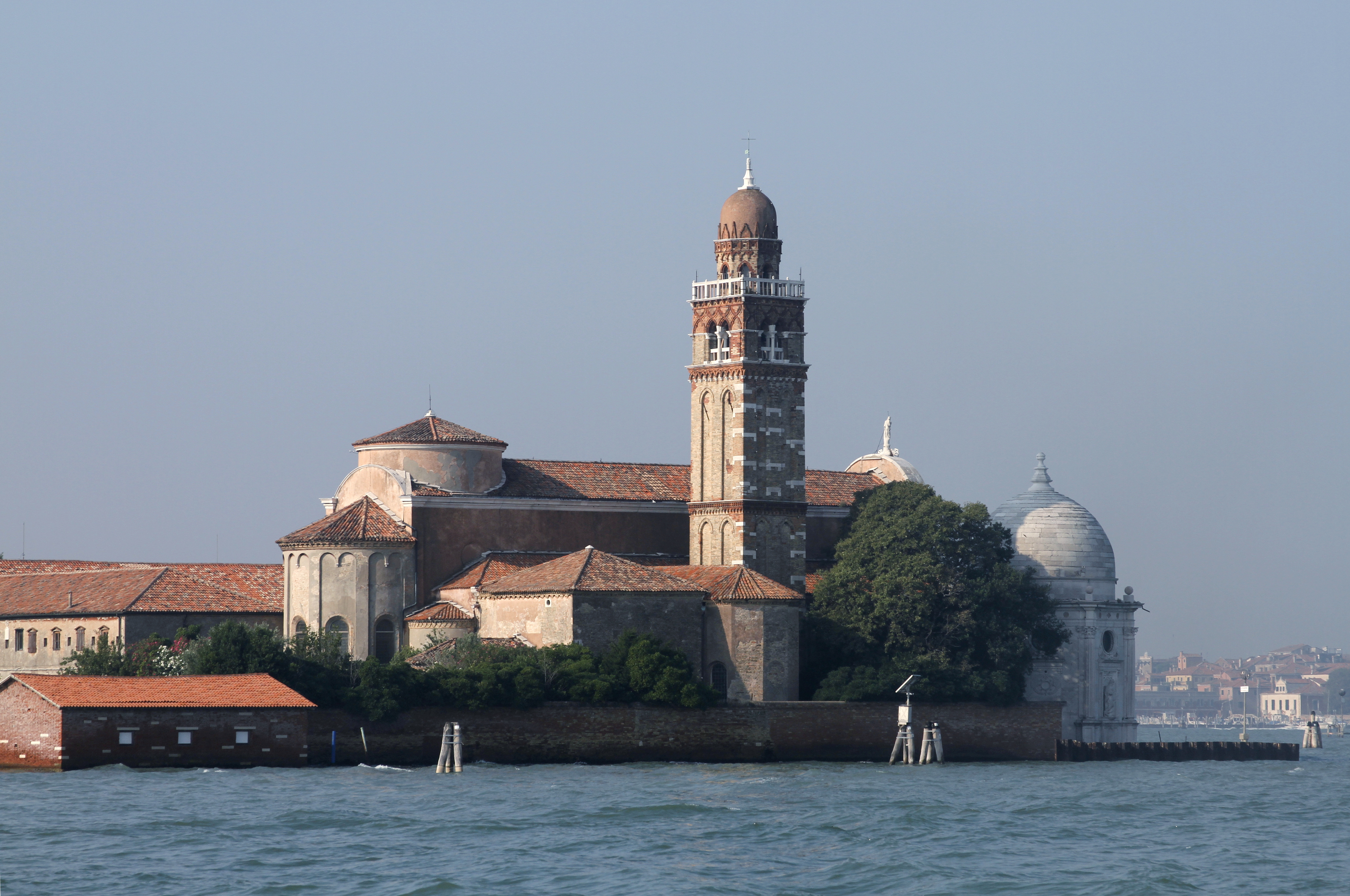
The church seen from northeast

== History of the monastery ==
It is stated by Cornaro, that Camaldolese tradition holds that Saint Romuald, founder of the order, lived circa the year 1000 on this island, perhaps attracted by its insularity relative to the main islands of Venice. However, the first documentation we have is that a church dedicated to St Michael was granted in 1212 to the monastic order under the assent of the Bishops Marco Niccola and Buono Balbi. The church was consecrated in 1221 with attendance of Doge Pietro Ziani.

The abbey at the site endured some tumults during the following centuries, most regarding dissents within the Camaldolese; however, it remained a major institution in Venice. The Camaldolese theologian Angelo Calogera resided in this monastery in 1716–1724. The monk and cartographer, Fra Mauro, known for his map of the world dating to 1450, was associated with the monastery. Placido Zurla, also a monk at San Michele, wrote an account of the map, while his fellow Camaldolese and friend, Mauro Cappellari, later became Pope Gregory XVI. Others associated with the monastery include Pietro I Orseolo, Anselmo Costadoni, Gian Benedetto Mittarelli, and Pietro Delfino.

In 1810 the monastery like others was suppressed by the Napoleonic armies during his occupation of the Veneto. The monks continued their communal existence as the faculty of a college, until that too was dissolved in 1814. The community then transferred to Padua. At that point, many of the remaining monastic buildings were demolished, and the land began being used as a cemetery. Among those buried in this cemetery are Ezra Pound and Igor Stravinsky. The church was managed for a time by an order of Padri Reformati.

== Church of San Michele ==
In 1453, a fire destroyed the old church, prompting reconstruction by Mauro Codussi as the architect, begun in 1469 and completed in 1480. This is the first church known to have been designed by Codussi. Built entirely in salt-white Istrian stone, the facade has weathered to a pale gray. San Michele is considered one of the first examples of Renaissance architecture in Venice, with a facade that appears influenced by the work of Alberti. The strongly delineated masonry courses of the ashlar facade are carried right across the Ionic pilasters, a strikingly unusual feature for which that R. Lieberman could only find an earlier parallel in Bernardo Rossellino's Palazzo Piccolomini in Pienza, also of the 1460s, and also produced in an Albertian milieu. The design was influential in Venice. When it was finished, a monk of the community wrote, "The facade, now complete and perfect, shiner of such a beauty so that it turns in itself the light of the eyes of all those who walk or sail by".

The interior has a nave and two aisles, with polychrome marble decorations. A description from 1868 recalls the decoration of the church included a Bust of Cardinal Giovanni Dolfin (1622), sculpted by Bernini, and located above the interior portal. The organ doors had four paintings by Domenico Campagnola. In the nave were paintings of St Boniface and a Russian Ruler by Gregorio Lazzarini, and painting depicting the Blessed Michele Pini by Ambrogio Bono. The tomb of Paolo Sarpi had been moved here from the church of the Servi. The main chapel, had a Moses and the serpent by Antonio Zanchi, and an Adoration of the Golden Calf by Lazzarini. The Cappella Emiliana, commissioned by Giovanni Miani for his wife Margherita Vitturi, was completed in 1530 by Guglielmo Bergamesco.

On the other side is a cloister dating to the 15th century, through which the cemetery can be reached.

== See also ==
- Late medieval domes
- San Michele Cemetery, Venice
