= Angelo Calogerà =

Italian Benedictine monk and writer

Angelo Calogerà O.S.B. Cam.
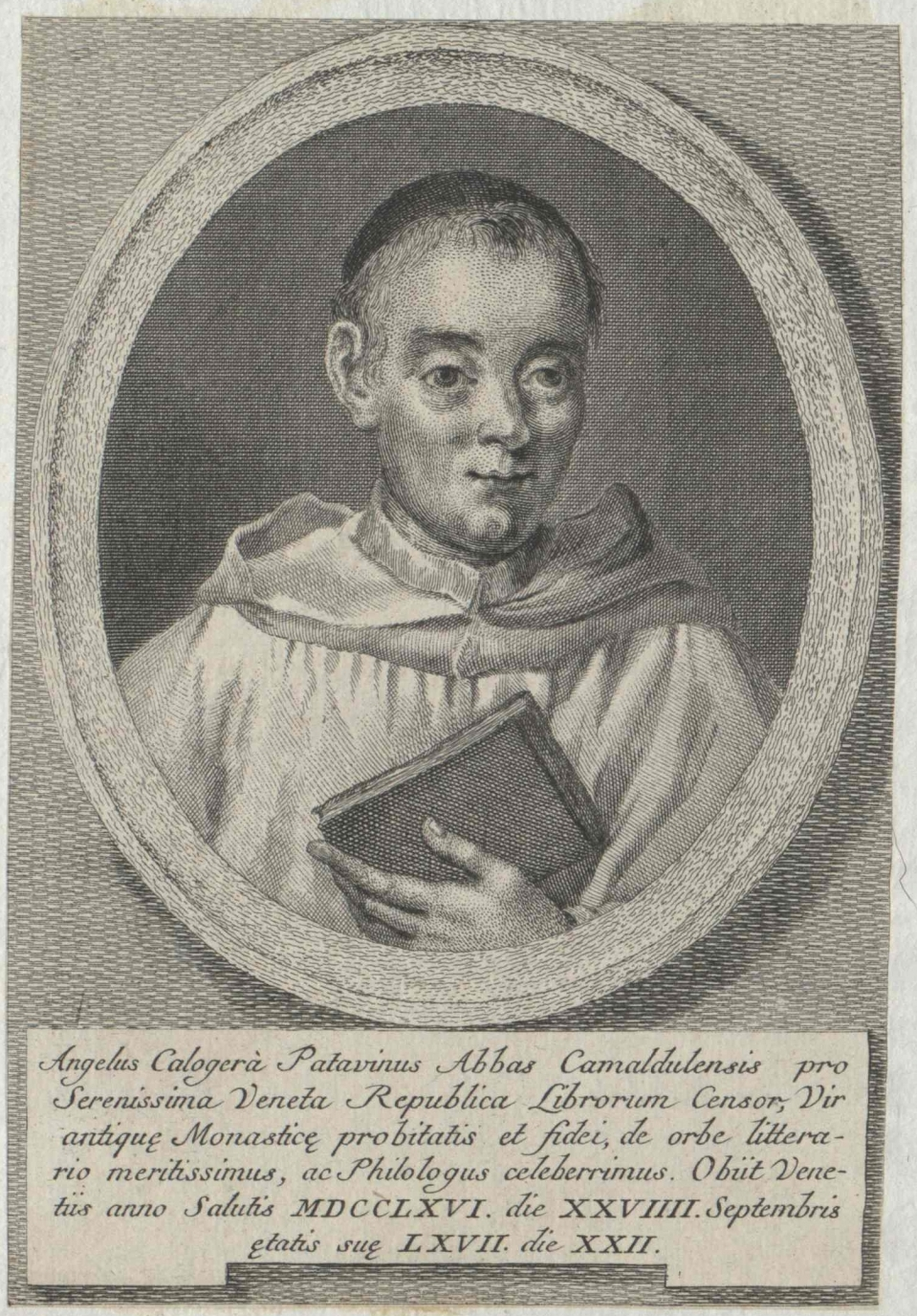
- Dom Angelo Calogerà

Personal life
- Born: Domenico Demetrio Calogerà c. 7 September 1696 Padua, Republic of Venice
- Died: 29 September 1766 (aged 70) Isola di San Michele, Venice
- Parent(s): Liberale Calogerà and Giustina Labarvellon
- Known for: Raccolta d'opuscoli scientifici e filologici
- Occupation: Monk, writer, and polymath

Religious life
- Religion: Roman Catholicism
- Order: Camaldolese
- Ordination: 3 February 1717

Angelo Calogerà, also known as Domenico Demetrio Calogerà, O.S.B. Cam. (c. 7 September 1696, Padua — 29 September 1766, Isola di San Michele) was an Italian Benedictine monk and writer, active in popularizing literature and science.

== Life ==
Angelo was born Domenico Demetrio Calogerà circa September 7, 1696, in Padua, Republic of Venice, to Don Liberale Calogerà of Corfu and Giustina Labarvellon. His father was a member of the aristocratic Calogerà family and had distinguished himself in the War of Cyprus against the Ottoman Empire in the 1570s; eventually, he settled in Padua, held several administrative posts there, and finally moved to Venice and gained Venetian citizenship. In 1716 Angelo became a Camaldolese monk, initially as librarian of the San Michele di Murano and later as prior of San Giorgio Maggiore.

In 1728, at the peak of Antonio Vallisneri's renown, Calogerà began publishing Raccolta d'opuscoli scientifici e filologici, followed in 1755 by Nuova raccolta d'opuscoli scientifici e filologici, which continued until its forty-second volume in 1787. In the first volume, after explicitly recognizing the value of modern culture, he published the Progetto ai letterati d'Italia per iscrivere le loro vite by Giovanni Artico, count of Porcìa, followed by a biography, Vita di Giambattista Vico scritta da sé medesimo, and then (in the second volume) an autobiography of Pier Jacopo Martello.

In 1762 he founded, together with father Giacomo Rebellini, the literary journal Minerva ossia Nuovo giornale dei letterati d'Italia, which ran until 1767 in opposition to the Frusta letteraria of Giuseppe Baretti. Calogerà also wrote Memorie intorno alla vita di M. Luca De Renaldis vescovo di Trieste consigliere intimo dell'imperadore Massimiliano I e suo ambasciatore a molte corti sovrane d'Europa (1753). He died in Venice on 29 September 1766.

== Bibliography ==
- De Michelis, Cesare (1973). "Calogerà, Angelo". Dizionario Biografico degli Italiani (in Italian). Vol. 16: Caccianiga–Caluso. Rome: Istituto dell'Enciclopedia Italiana. ISBN 978-88-12-00032-6.
