= Isola di San Michele =

Island in the Venetian Lagoon, Italy

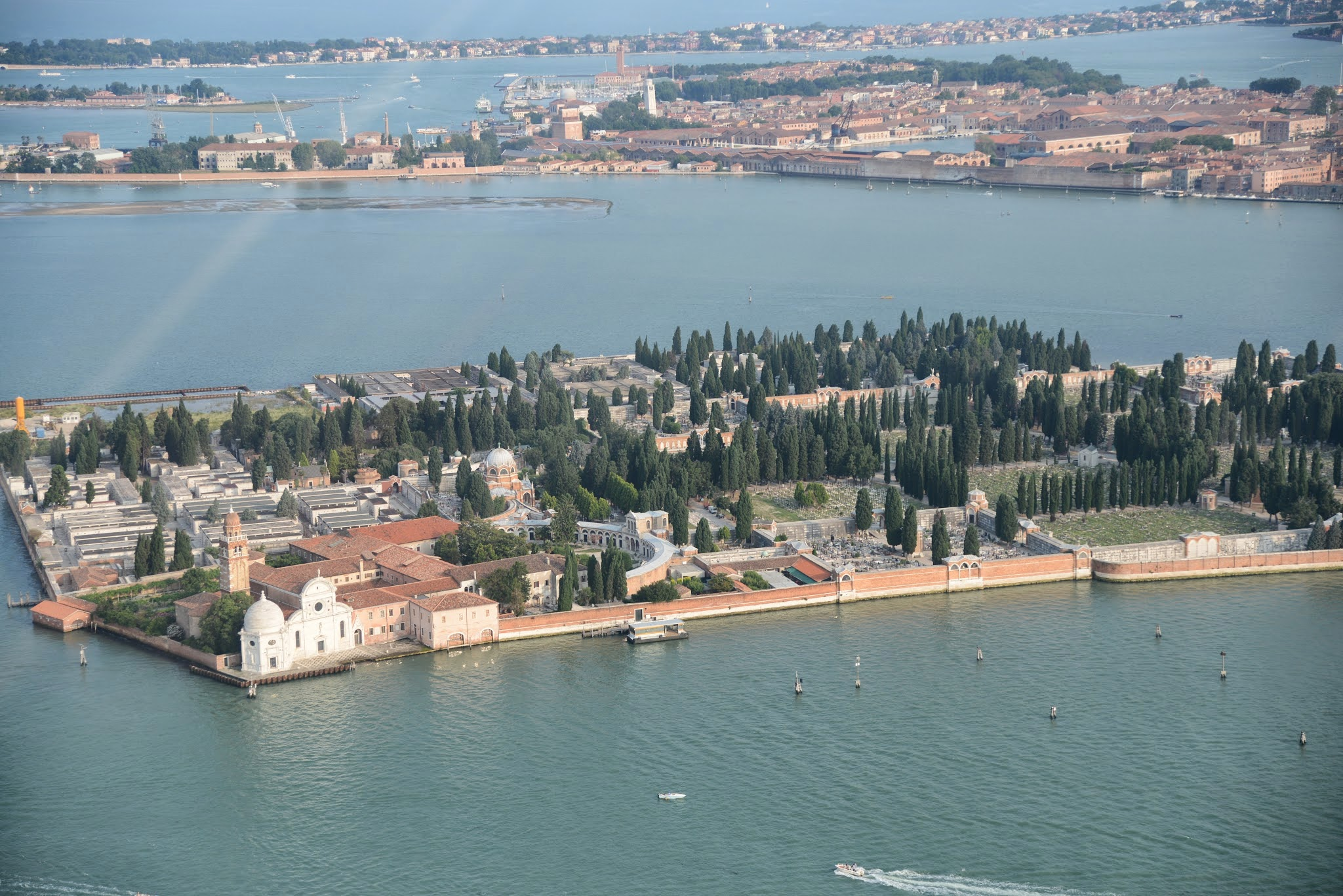
- Aerial view of Isola di San Michele

- Location within Venetian Lagoon
- Interactive map of Isola di San Michele

Geography
- Coordinates: 45.447°N 12.347°E
- Adjacent to: Venetian Lagoon
- Area: 0.176 km^{2} (0.068 sq mi)
- Highest elevation: 1 m (3 ft)

Administration
- Italy
- Region: Veneto
- Province: Province of Venice
- Click on the map for a fullscreen view

The Island of San Michele (Italian: isola di San Michele, [ˈiːzola di sam miˈkɛːle]; Venetian: ìxoła de San Michièl) is an island in the Venetian Lagoon, Veneto, northern Italy. The island contains San Michele in Isola, a Catholic church, as well as the San Michele Cemetery, Venice’s principal cemetery. It is associated with the sestiere of Cannaregio, from which it lies a short distance northeast.

== History ==
Along with neighbouring San Cristoforo della Pace, the island was a popular place for local travellers and fishermen to land. Mauro Codussi's Chiesa di San Michele in Isola of 1469, the first Renaissance church in Venice, and a monastery lie on the island, which also served for a time as a prison.

== San Michele cemetery ==
The island has served as the principal cemetery of Venice since 1807.

- San Michele Cemetery, Venice

== Gallery ==
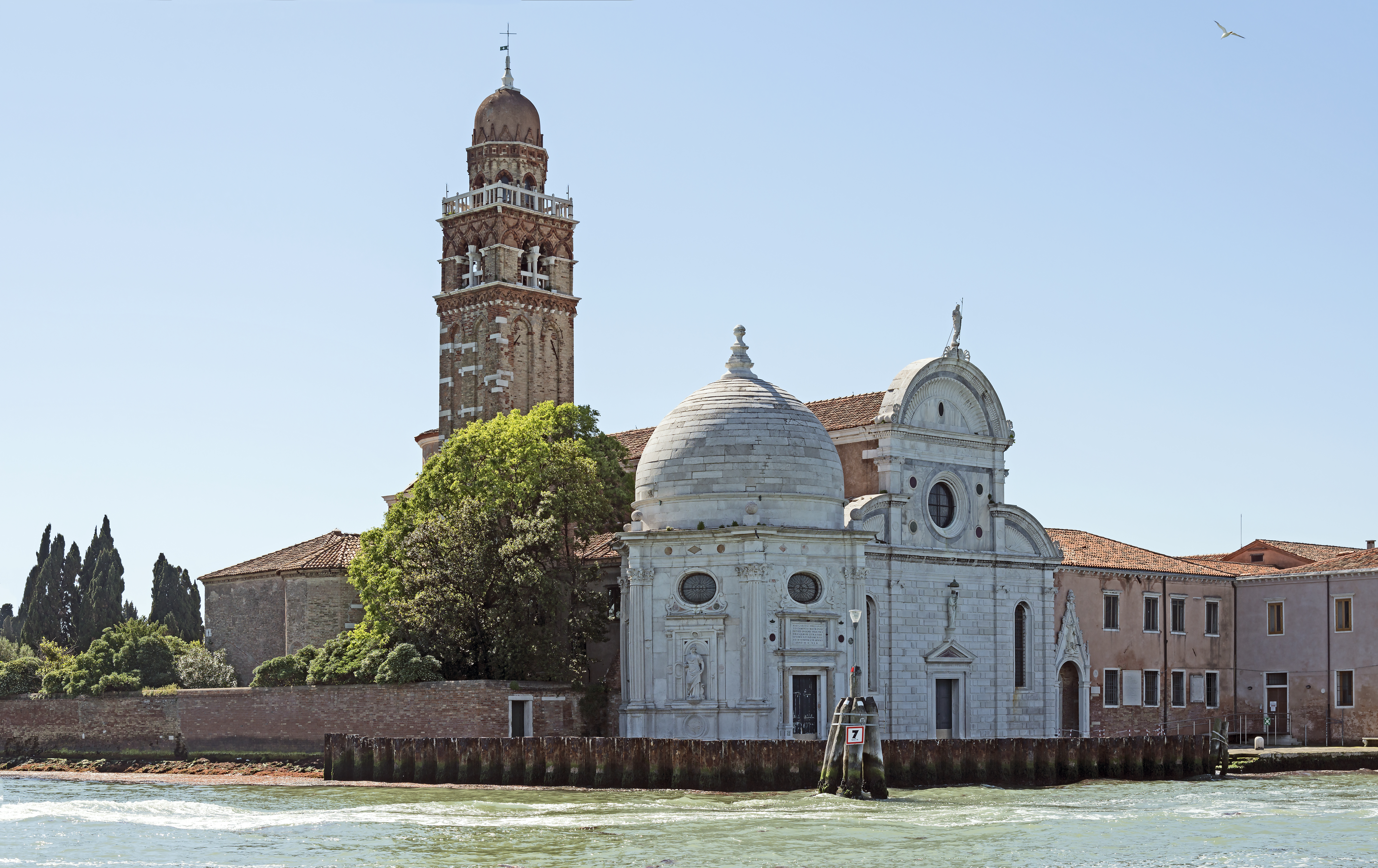
Church S.Michele in Isola

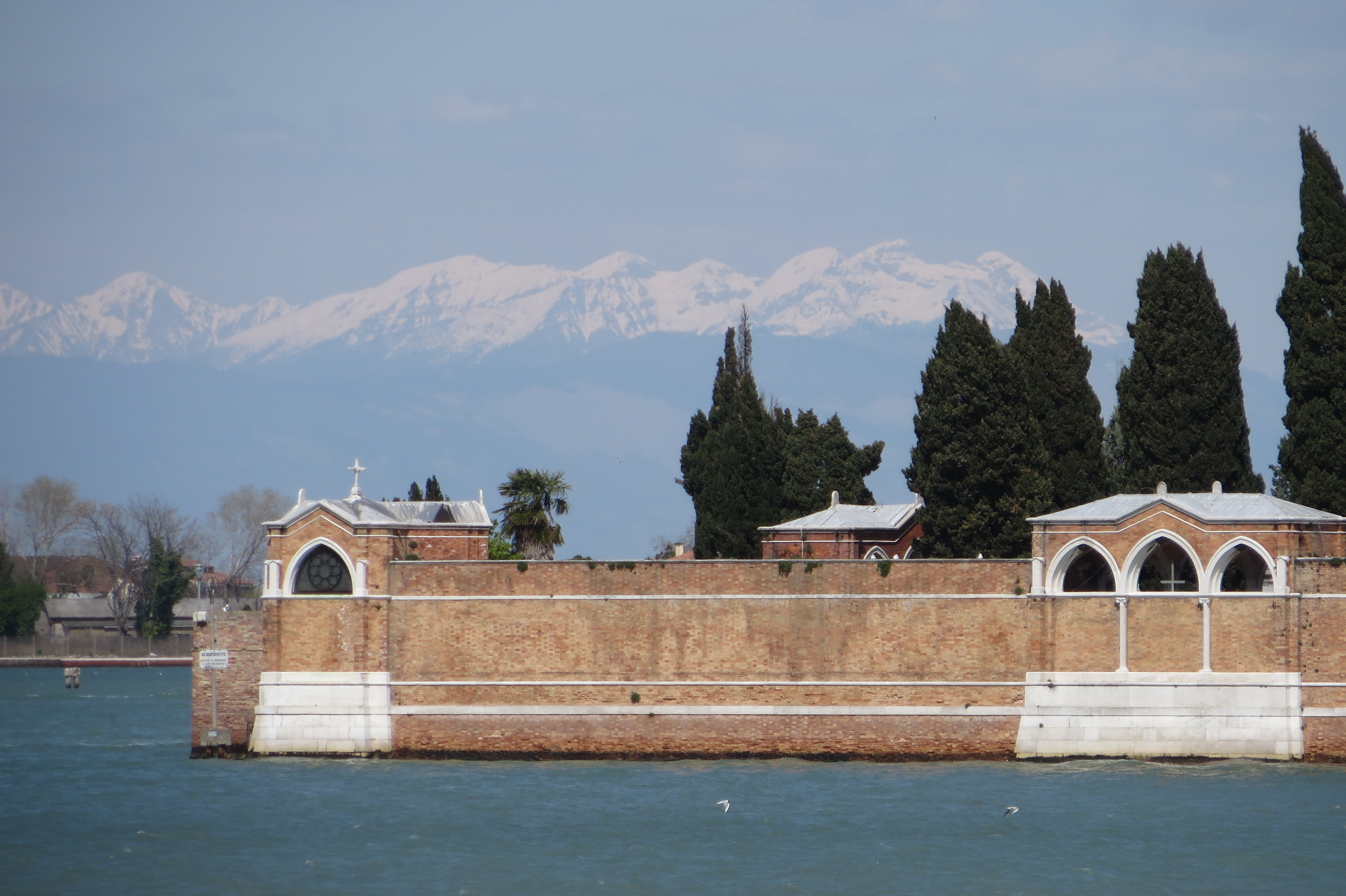
Walls of San Michele

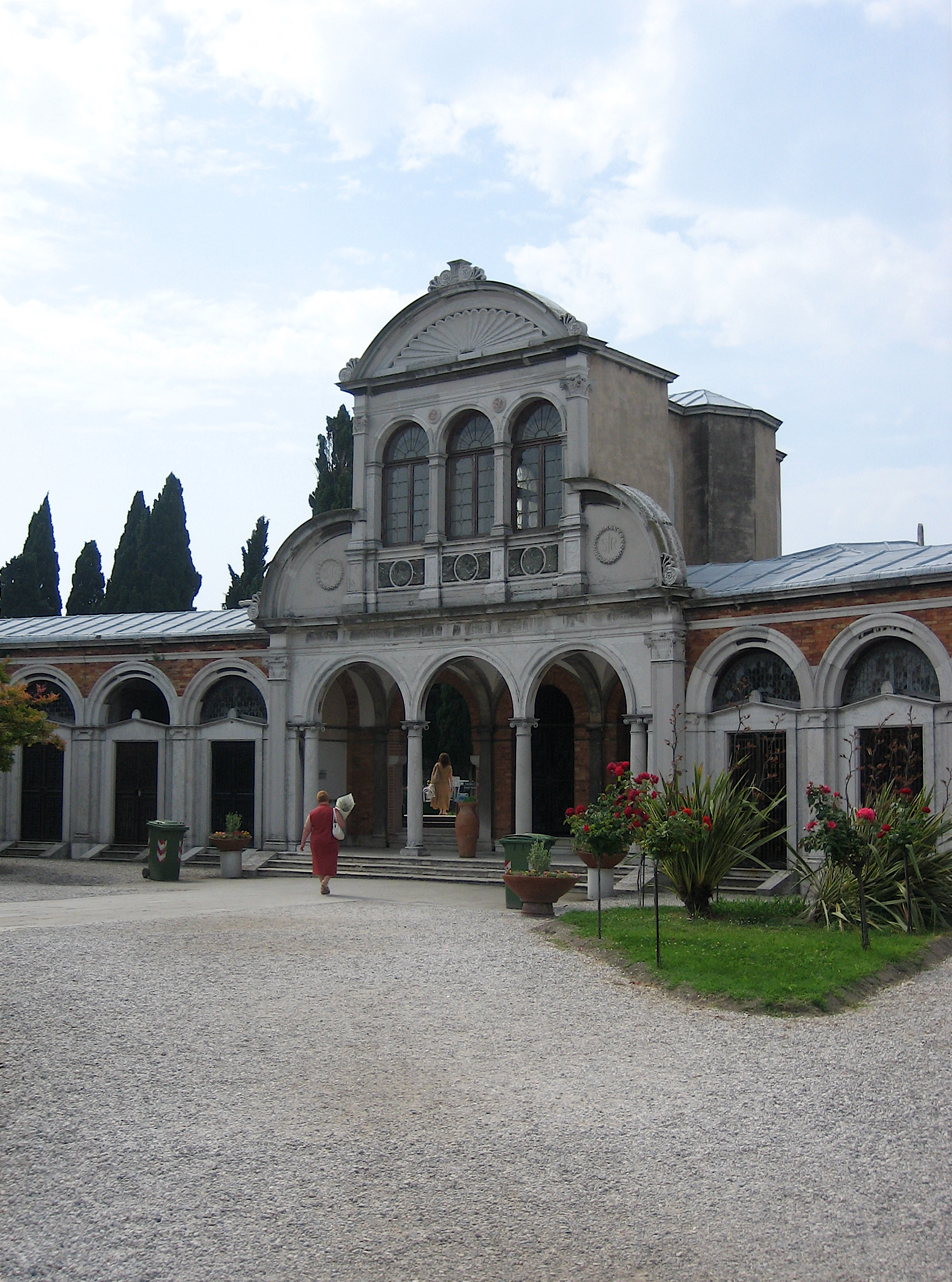
Chapel of San Rocco

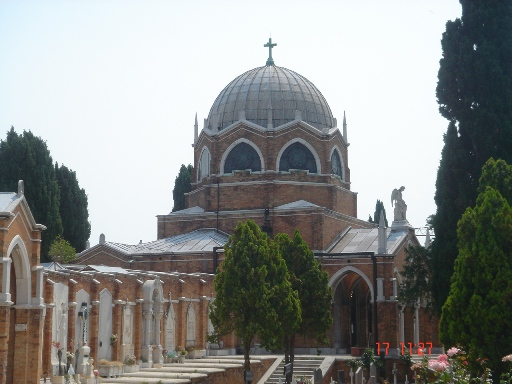
San Cristoforo

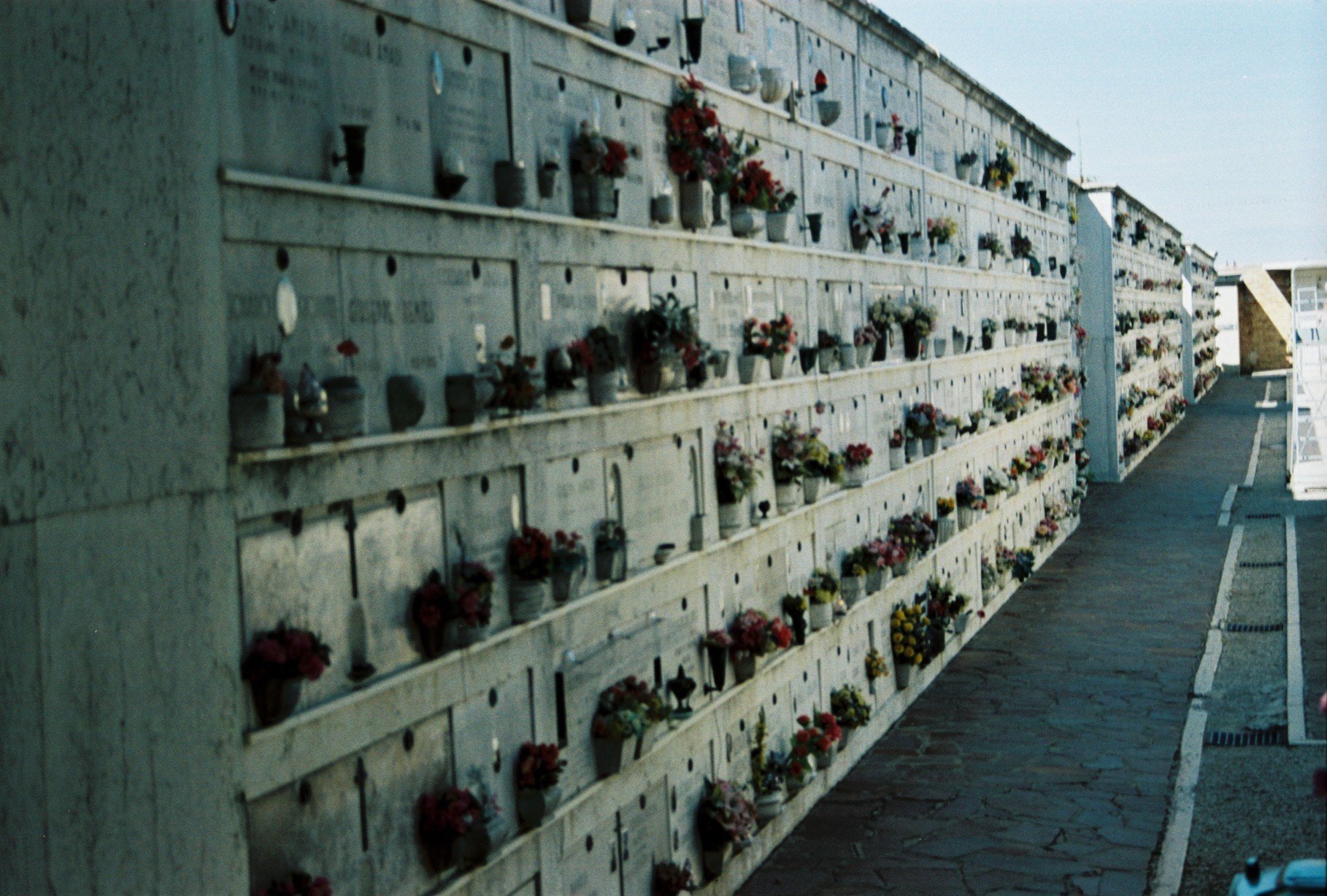
Graves

== See also ==
- List of islands of Italy
