= Pietro Delfino =

Italian theologician

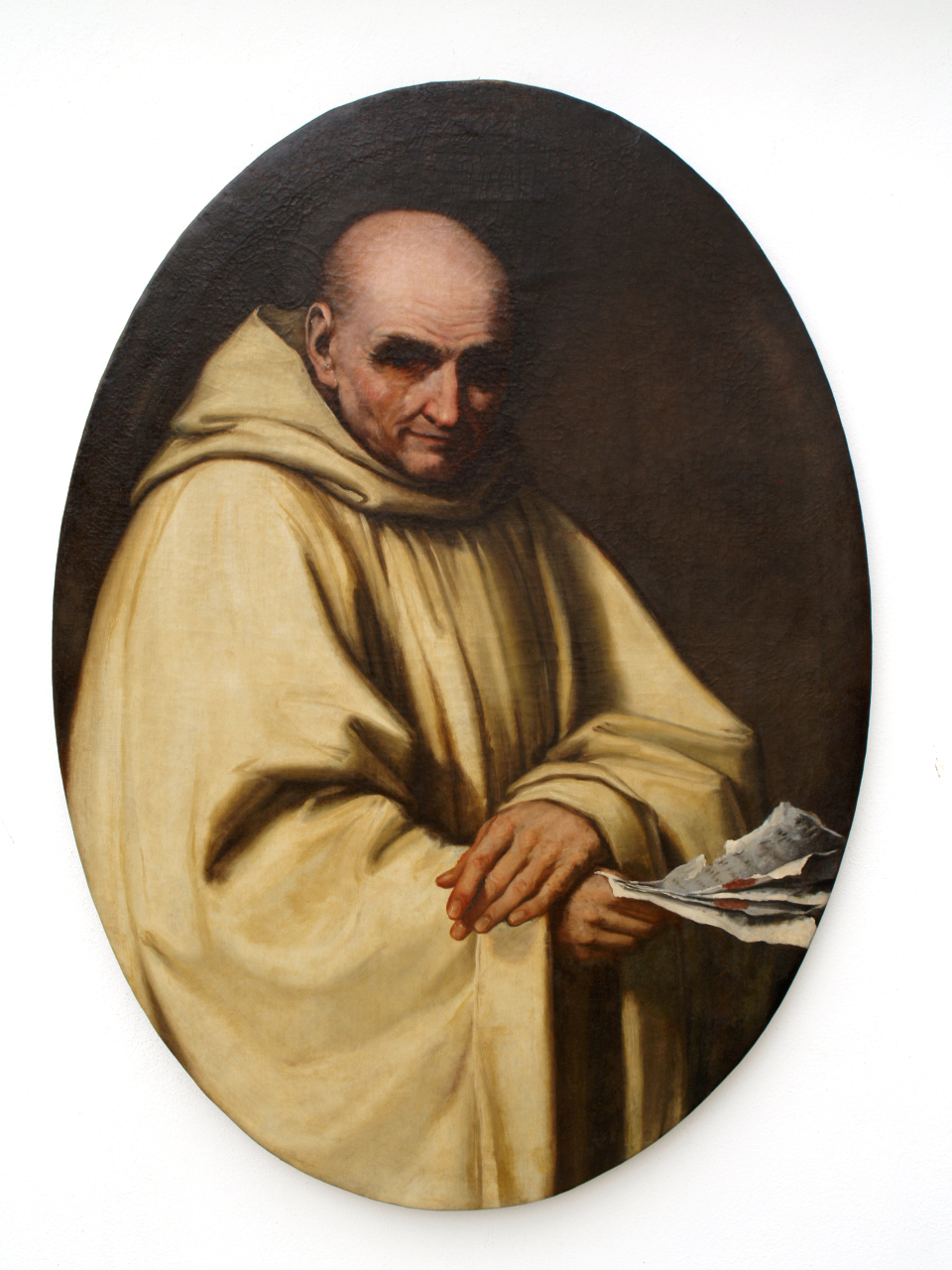
Ambito ravennate, "Ritratto di Pietro Dolfin", 1711-1715, Ravenna, Aula Magna della Biblioteca Classense

Pietro Delfino or Delfin, O.S.B. Cam., (born at Venice in 1444; died 16 January 1525) was an Italian Camaldolese monk, patristic scholar, theologian, abbot, and Superior General of his religious Order.

== Life ==
Pietro Delfin was a patrician of Venice, member of the famous Delfin family, one of the oldest noble families in Venice. Pietro entered the Camaldolese Monastery of St. Michael, which was located on the island of Murano in the Venetian Lagoon. In 1479, he was elected abbot of the same community. The following year he was made prior general of the Order, based at Camaldoli in the region of Arezzo. He held that office until the year 1513 when he resigned in favour of Paul Giustiniani, whom he had invested with the Camaldolese habit in 1510.

Delfin was the forty-sixth prior general from St. Romuald, the founder of the Camaldolese, and he was the last elected for life--the office after him being held for three years only. From 1481 to 1508, Delfin was proposed to serve as bishop of Venice on five occasions, but refused them all. On four occasions he was also proposed to serve as Patriarch of Aquilea, but refused again. He was also presented with the cardinalate in two occasions, but respectfully declined to the Pope to continue serving the camaldolese order.

Delfin was one of the main opposers to Savonarola, but still promoted the reform inside the Catholic Church which would lead to the Council of Trento.

== Works ==
The letters of Delfin, which number more than 4,000, are addressed to other religions and other orders and to various secular dignitaries, contain accounts of contemporary events in his own Order and the Church in general. A collection of his Latin letters was published at Venice in 1524. Several others that had been omitted in the Venetian editions were included later in Martène's "Veterum Scriptorum amplissima collectio". The "Apothegmata Patrum" and the "Dialogues" on Savonarola are still unedited.
