= New Camaldoli Hermitage =

Benedictine monastery in Big Sur, California

- Interactive map of New Camaldoli Hermitage

Monastery information
- Full name: Immaculate Heart Hermitage
- Order: Camaldolese Benedictines
- Established: 1958; 68 years ago
- Mother house: Sacro Eremo of Camaldoli, Poppi, Arezzo, Italy
- Dedication: Immaculate Heart of Mary
- Diocese: Monterey

People
- Prior: Ignatius M. Tully

Site
- Location: Big Sur, California, United States
- Coordinates: 36°01′15″N 121°33′02″W
- Website: https://www.contemplation.com/

New Camaldoli Hermitage (formally called Immaculate Heart Hermitage) is a rural Camaldolese Benedictine hermitage in the Santa Lucia Mountains of Big Sur, California, in the United States. The Camaldolese branch of the Benedictine family was founded by St. Romuald in the late 10th century. The hermitage was consecrated under the Immaculate Heart of Mary and was known by that name for its first decades, but its official name is New Camaldoli.

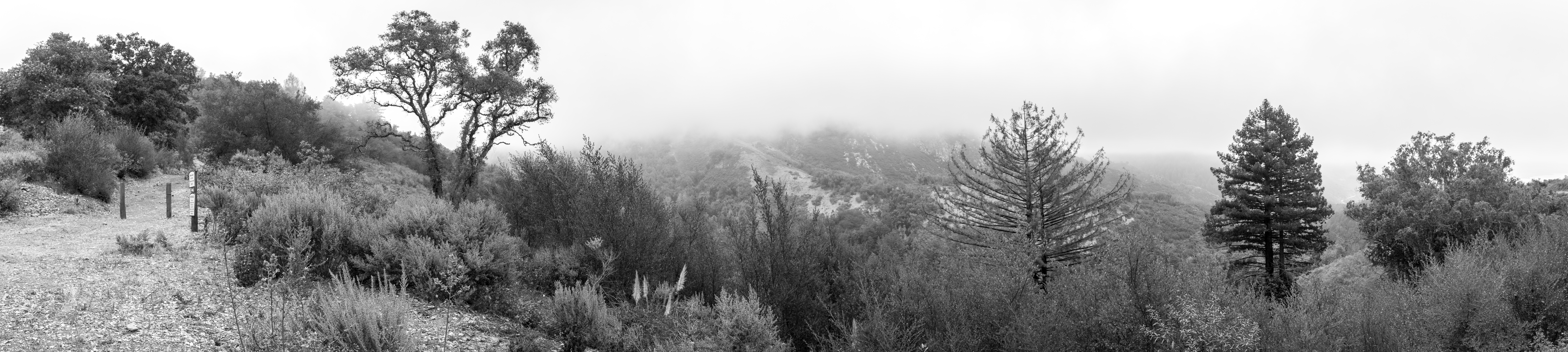
Panorama from the New Camaldoli Hermitage.

The hermitage was founded in 1958 by two monks from the motherhouse in Camaldoli in Tuscany, who had spent two years searching for a site that combined solitude and natural beauty. It is located at an altitude of approximately 1,300 feet (400 meters), and is approached by a winding road nearly two miles long, which gives the visitor a clear view of the landscape and Pacific coastline.

The hermitage is located 2 miles (3.2 km) from the Big Sur Coast Highway (Highway 1), .75 miles (1.21 km) south of the Lucia Lodge. It is situated between San Luis Obispo (85 miles (137 km) to the south) and Monterey (55 miles (89 km) to the north).

== History ==
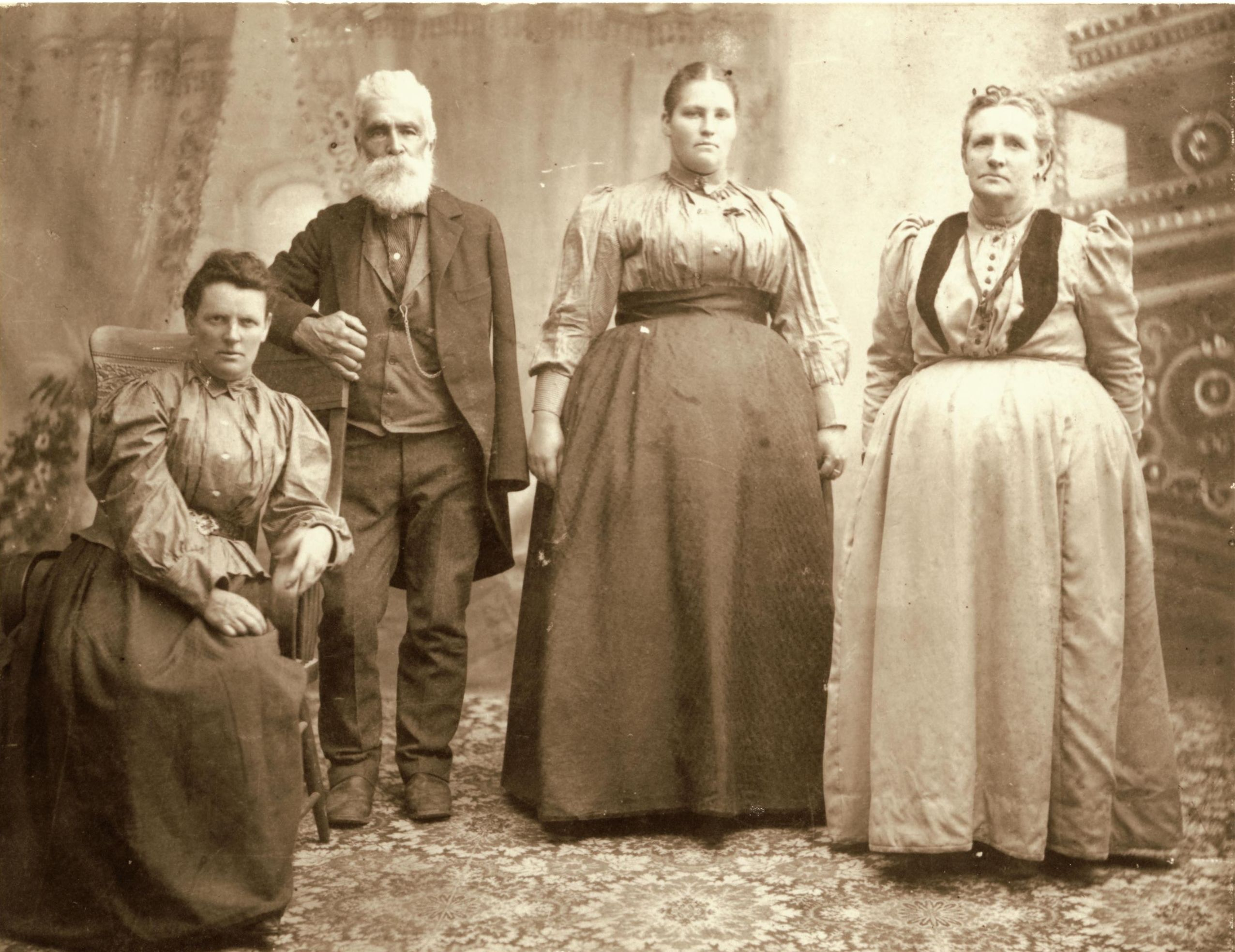
The Dani family: (L–R) daughter Mary Elizabeth, father Gabriel, daughter Lucia, and mother Elizabeth

Before the arrival of the Spanish in the 1700s, the land may have first been occupied the Salinan Antonianos subtribe who are believed to have lived on the coast and inland as far north as Soledad. It is believed the northern limit of the tribe along the Santa Lucia Mountains is Junipero Serra Peak, east of Slates Hot Springs. The Salinan named it Pimkolam.

In 1925, Moore bought the Sheridan Press, the Circle M Ranch in Wyoming, and the Dani property in the same year, which he also named the Circle M Ranch. He raised horses in Wyoming that he raced at Hialeah in Florida.

Radio personality John Nesbitt bought the ranch in 1942 and he moved his family to the ranch in 1947. It was later owned by the Smart brothers of King City. The Benedictine Order of Camaldolese monks acquired part of the Lucia Ranch property, now known as the Circle M ranch, in 1958.

== Vows ==
Upon committing to live as a hermit, a monk must commit to the vows of poverty, chastity, obedience, and stability.

== Hermitage life ==
A dozen monks live and work at the hermitage. Each monk lives in a small cottage, called a "cell," which is divided from its neighbors by a high wall and includes a small garden. Labors include a guest ministry, retreats, a bakery, a book store, cooking, and writing.

In January 2024, Ignatius M. Tully was elected prior of the hermitage.

== Expansion ==
New Camaldoli has founded two daughter communities, Incarnation Monastery in Berkeley, California, near the Graduate Theological Union, in 1979 and the Monastery of the Risen Christ in San Luis Obispo, California, in 2014.

== St. Romuald's brief rule ==
Sit in your cell as in paradise. Put the whole world behind you and forget it. Watch your thoughts like a good fisherman watching for fish. The path you must follow is in the Psalms—never leave it. If you have just come to the monastery, and in spite of your good will you cannot accomplish what you want, take every opportunity you can to sing the Psalms in your heart and to understand them with your mind. And if your mind wanders as you read, do not give up; hurry back and apply your mind to the words once more. Realize above all that you are in God's presence, and stand there with the attitude of one who stands before the emperor. Empty yourself completely and sit waiting, content with the grace of God, like the chick who tastes nothing and eats nothing but what his mother brings him.
