= Paul Giustiniani =

Roman Catholic clergyman

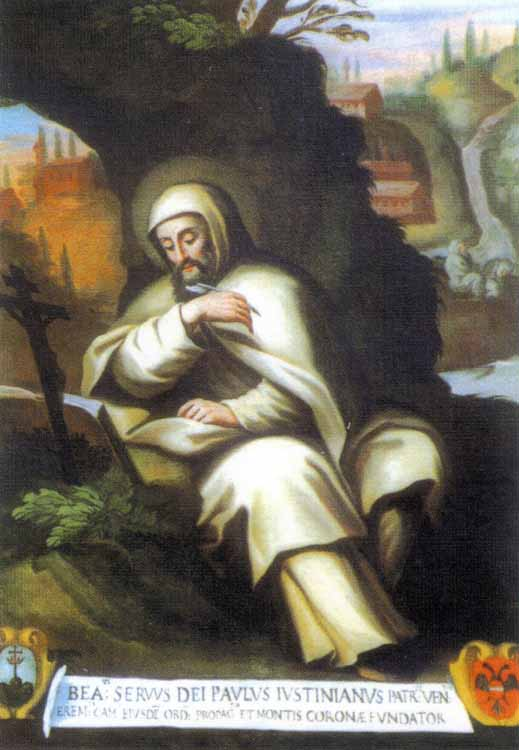
Paul Giustiniani

Paul (Paolo) Giustiniani (1476–1528), born Tommaso (Thomas), was a Roman Catholic clergyman who reformed the Camaldolese order of monks.

In 1510, he joined Camaldoli. At the time, there were problems and disagreements in monastic observance between the hermits and monks in Camaldoli, and which Prior General Peter Delfino was unable to resolve. He was friends with Pope Leo X, who granted Giustiniani the powers to institute reform of the order. He was elected superior of the hermitage and Camaldoli in 1516 and published the Regula Vitae Eremiticae in 1520.

However, he continued to encounter disagreement and opposition to his reforms, and so subsequently left with some other hermits to form a separate group, which would later evolve into an autonomous congregation.

He is venerated in the Roman Catholic Church as Blessed Paolo Giustiniani. His feast day is celebrated by the Camaldolese Order on 25 July and elsewhere on 28 July.
