= Church of the Holy Polish Brothers Martyrs, Bydgoszcz =

Catholic church in Kuyavian-Pomeranian, Poland

Coordinates: 53°06′04″N 18°02′34″E

Church of the Holy Polish Brothers Martyrs
- Polish: Kościół Świętych Polskich Braci Męczenników w Bydgoszczy
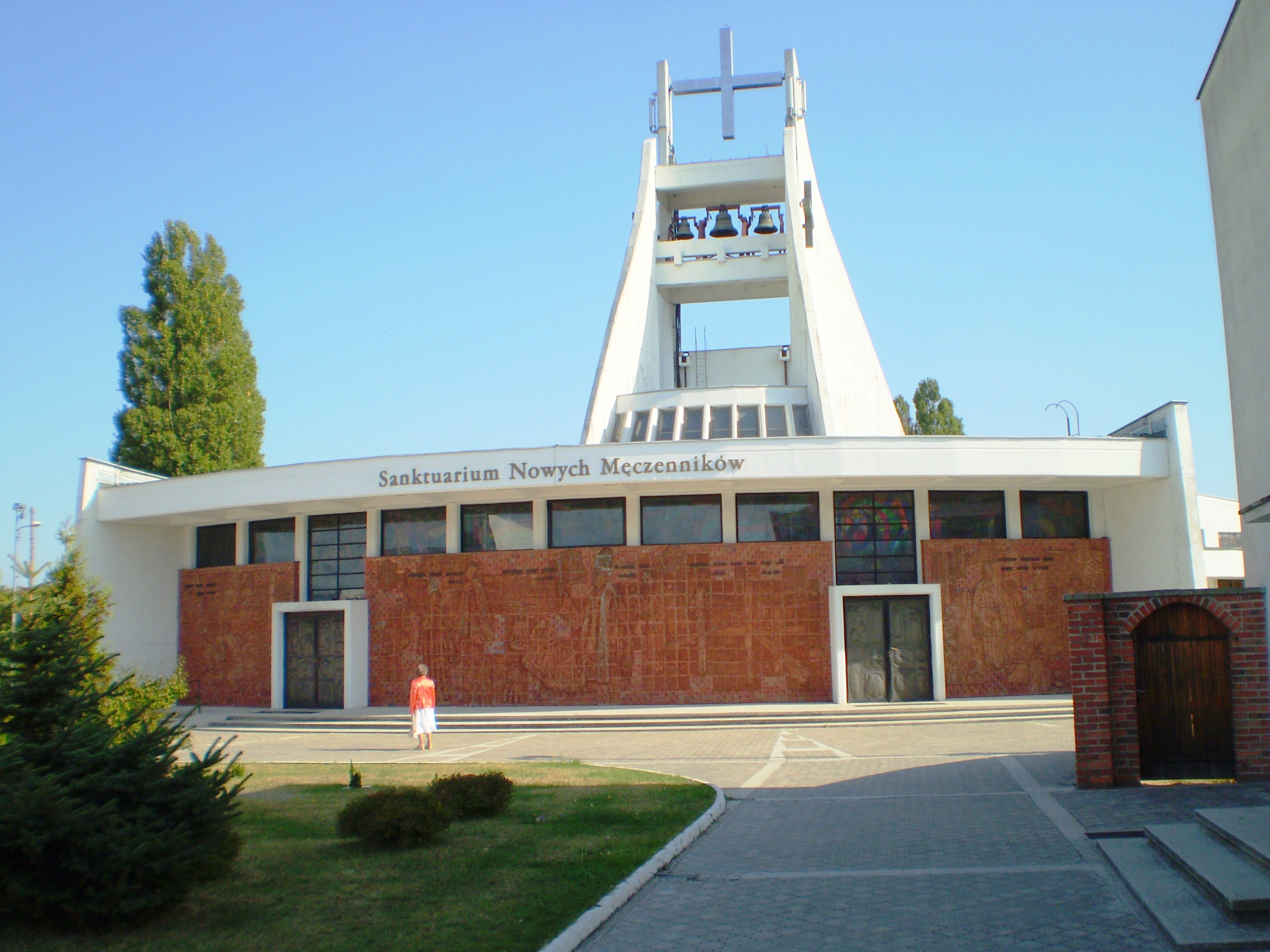
- Church of the Holy Polish Brothers Martyrs, Bydgoszcz
- Church of the Holy Polish Brothers Martyrs
- Location: 3 Jerzego Popiełuszki street, Bydgoszcz
- Country: Poland
- Denomination: Catholic Church
- Website: http://www.meczennicy.bydgoszcz.pl/

History
- Status: Church
- Dedication: Five Saint Martyr Brothers
- Dedicated: November 23, 1986

Architecture
- Functional status: Active
- Architect: Leopold Taraszkiewicz
- Architectural type: Modernism
- Completed: 1982

The Church of the Holy Polish Brothers Martyrs is a Catholic church that has been elevated to the rank of a sanctuary. It houses the relics of the "Five Saint Polish Brothers". In 1984, Father Jerzy Popiełuszko celebrated his last Holy Mass there before being abducted and assassinated by members of the Security Service.

The church is located at 3 Jerzego Popiełuszki street, in the Wyżyny district of Bydgoszcz, Poland.

== History ==
=== Pre-WWII schemes ===
The first efforts to build a Catholic church in the area (today's Kapuściska and Wyżyny districts) date back to the interwar period.

Before 1939, a church building committee had been established in Kapuściska district: the aim was to build on the escarpment of the southern bank of the Brda river, mirroring the 1925 Saint Stanislaus of Szczepanów's Church on northern bank (Siernieczek district). However, the outbreak of WWII prevented any further development of the plan.

=== Post WWII period ===
After the war (1946), the catholic church of "Saint Joseph the Craftsman in Bydgoszcz" was created in the southern suburbs, from a former Evangelical church, in Toruńska street.

In the following decades, Kapuściska (1950s) and Wyżyny (1960s-1970s) districts saw a dramatic increase of their residents, thanks to the many housing estates erected. However, the state authorities did not approve of any erection of new parishes, following a nationwide movement. To mitigate the decision, Primate Stefan Wyszyński had taken the initiative to support the creation of pastoral centers on Polish territory: one of them was built in Wyżyny area.

Eventually, in 1973, after many efforts, the authorities granted the construction of a new church in Bydgoszcz. The project aspired to honor the memory of Bydgoszcz victims of Nazi terror. Cardinal Stefan Wyszyński was the initiator of the construction of the Holy Polish Brothers Martyrs church. The plan design was commissioned to Leopold Taraszkiewicz, a specialist of sacral construction from the Gdańsk University of Technology and carried out by engineer Tadeusz Lisiewicz from Bydgoszcz. Interiors were designed by Kazimierz Gąsiorowski from Warsaw and realized by Bydgoszcz engineer Henryk Misterek.

The municipal authorities designated a plot at Szpitalna street: the foundation works comprised the manual drilling of 250 15 metres (49 ft) piles into the ground, which took almost a year.

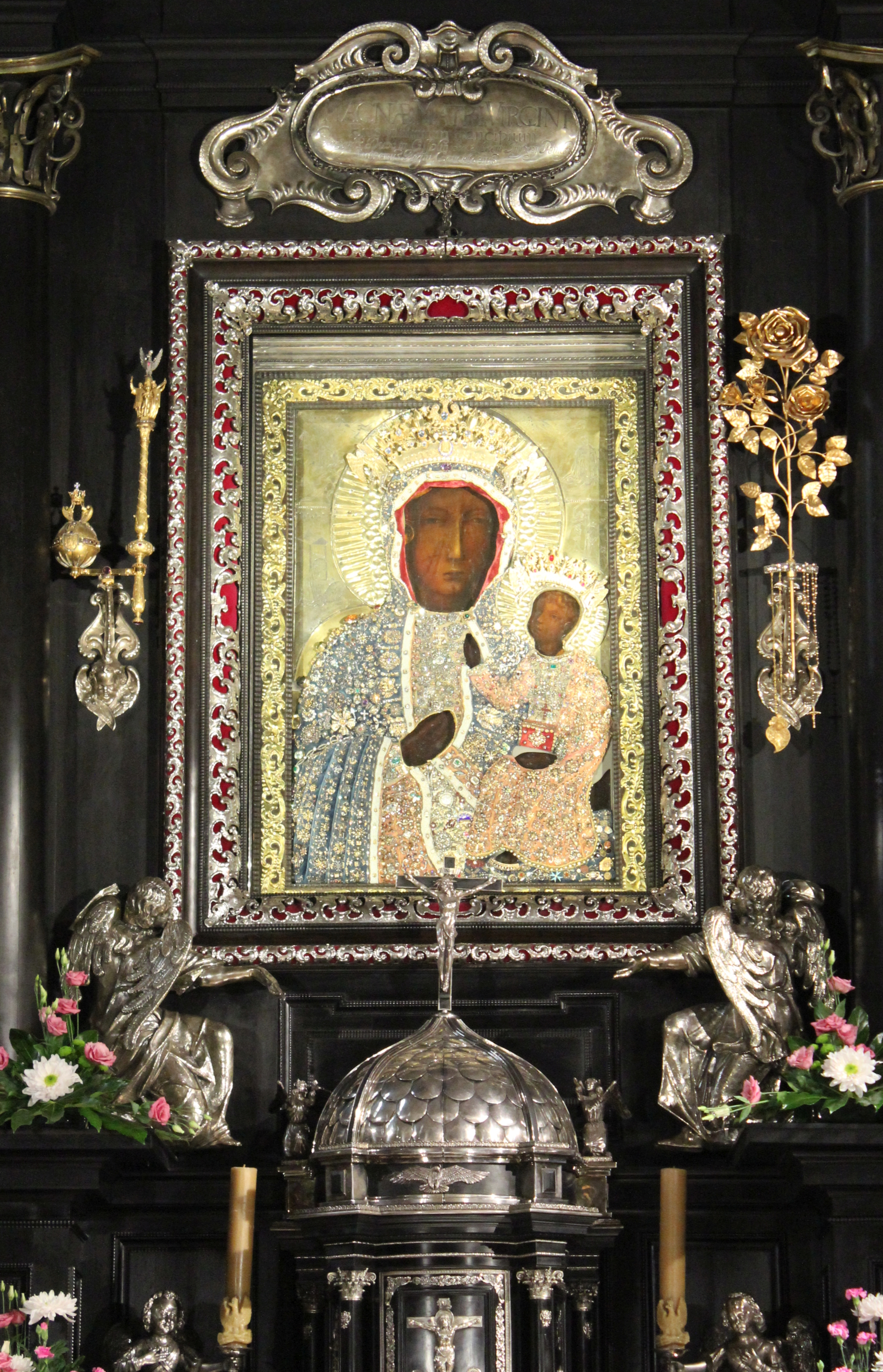
Black Madonna of Częstochowa, original

On August 15, 1976, the parish dedicated to the "St. Polish Brothers Martyrs" was created. Its parson was Father Romuald Biniak, who was in charge of supervising the construction of the church. It was the first parish in Bydgoszcz to receive a building permit since the end of the second World War. In Primate Wyszyński's decree, one can read: "This temple is to commemorate for eternity all nameless Poles who gave their lives for faith and homeland, and were not elevated to the altars." From the beginning, the construction was performed using without any participation of construction companies and the workforce was provided by volunteers, workers, engineers, constructors and artists. Together, they dug out 6,500 tonnes (1,020,000 st) of material from the site.

The rectory was first built in 1977. On April 15, 1978, the cornerstone of the future church was laid: the ceremony led by the Primate of Poland Stefan Wyszyński was attended by 30,000 inhabitants. The stone block comes from the foundations of the cathedral in Gniezno. It is still visible nowadays, embedded in the eastern wall between the church and the Chapel of the Memory.

On June 10, 1978, the first chapel was erected (Chapel of the Visitation of the Mother of God) and called the small church. On the same day, the site was visited by the picture Black Madonna of Częstochowa: despite a fierce opposition of the communist authorities, the procession was followed by several thousands of people. A replica of the Black Madonna, realized by Maria Torwirt from Toruń, has been installed on the altar in memory of this day.

The construction resumed towards northern and southern surrounding sites. Next edifices to be completed were the church tower and the main amphitheater with its upper gallery. On September 18, 1980, Primate Stefan Wyszyński consecrated the cross and the bells that were to be mounted on the church tower.

The first Holy Mass on the site was led by Cardinal Józef Glemp on December 18, 1982. The same Cardinal Józef Glemp solemnly consecrated the new church on November 23, 1986.

In 1986, a house for the Grey Ursulines serving in the parish was built on the site.

== Relationship with Blessed Father Jerzy Popiełuszko ==
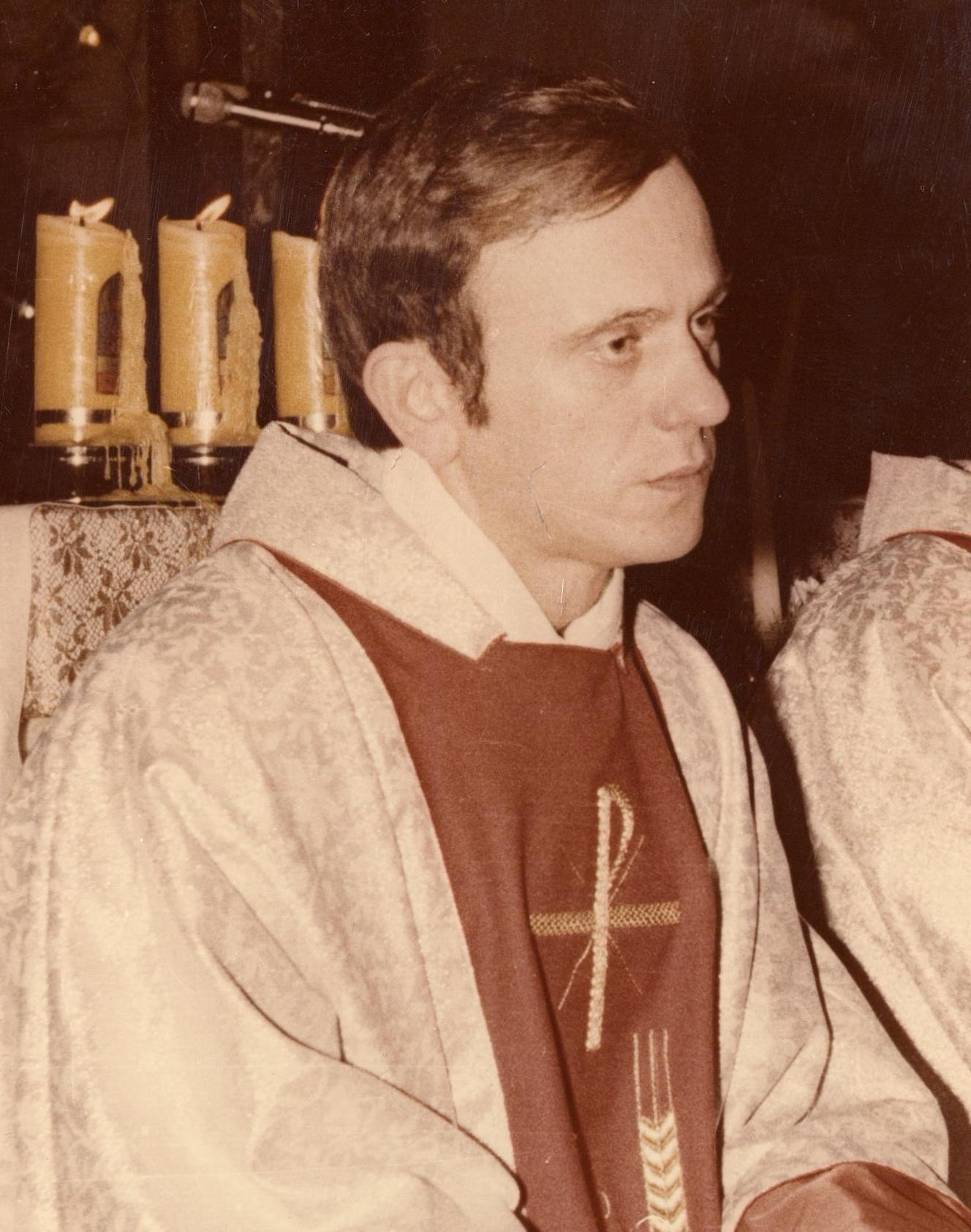
Father Jerzy Popiełuszko

The Church of the Holy Polish Brothers Martyrs was the last place where Father Jerzy Popieluszko celebrated a mass before he was murdered by officers of the Security Service (SB). Invited by the Pastoral Care of the Working People (Polish: Duszpasterstwa Ludzi Pracy), he arrived in Bydgoszcz on October 19, 1984. At 18.00, he celebrated his last Holy Mass in the church. His last words during the meditation were: Let us pray that we may be free from fear and intimidation, but above all from retaliation and violence.

Around 10 p.m., he went back to Warsaw with his driver, Waldemar Chrostowski. On the road between Bydgoszcz and Toruń, three officers of the SB (Grzegorz Piotrowski, Leszek Pękala and Waldemar Chmielewski) stopped the car and, after an extreme beating on the road, threw the almost-dead man from the Włocławek dam into the Vistula river. The news of the murder deeply shocked public opinion in the country and around the world. On June 6, 2010, Father Jerzy Popiełuszko was beatified.

On October 19, 1985, for the first anniversary of his death, a statue of Father Popiełuszko was unveiled on the site. In 1995, the organ of the church was named after him.

== Sanctuary of the New Martyrs ==
From the very beginning, the place became a center of patriotic thought related to the martyrdom of the Polish nation. In the 1980s, it was a church where people, shrouded in the spirit of "Solidarność Union" prayed for Homeland.

Veterans' associations supported the set up around the church of symbolic graves and commemorative plaques for the heroes of the fight for free Poland, such as:

- Father Jerzy Popieluszko;
- Sybirak;
- Katyn victims;
- Auschwitz victims;
- Polish Scouting.

During Pope John Paul II's trip to Poland in 1999, Bydgoszcz had been named the Station of the New Martyrs. On June 7, 1999, during the Holy Mass at the airport, John Paul II referred to the symbolism represented by the invocation of the church:

"This church [of the Holy Polish Brothers Martyrs] commemorates all nameless Poles who, during the history of Polish Christianity, gave their lives for Christ's Gospel and Homeland, starting with St. Wojciech [Adalbert of Prague]".

He also called for the commemoration of the martyrs who gave their lives for the faith. In response to this appeal, a year after the Pope's pilgrimage, (June 7, 2000) Henryk Muszyński, then Archbishop of Gniezno, officially elevated the church to the dignity of Sanctuary of the New Martyrs, as a way to commemorate the martyrdom of Poland. Furthermore, mementoes of the presence of John Paul II in Bydgoszcz were deposited in the papal chapel.

=== Relics of the Holy Polish Martyr Brothers ===
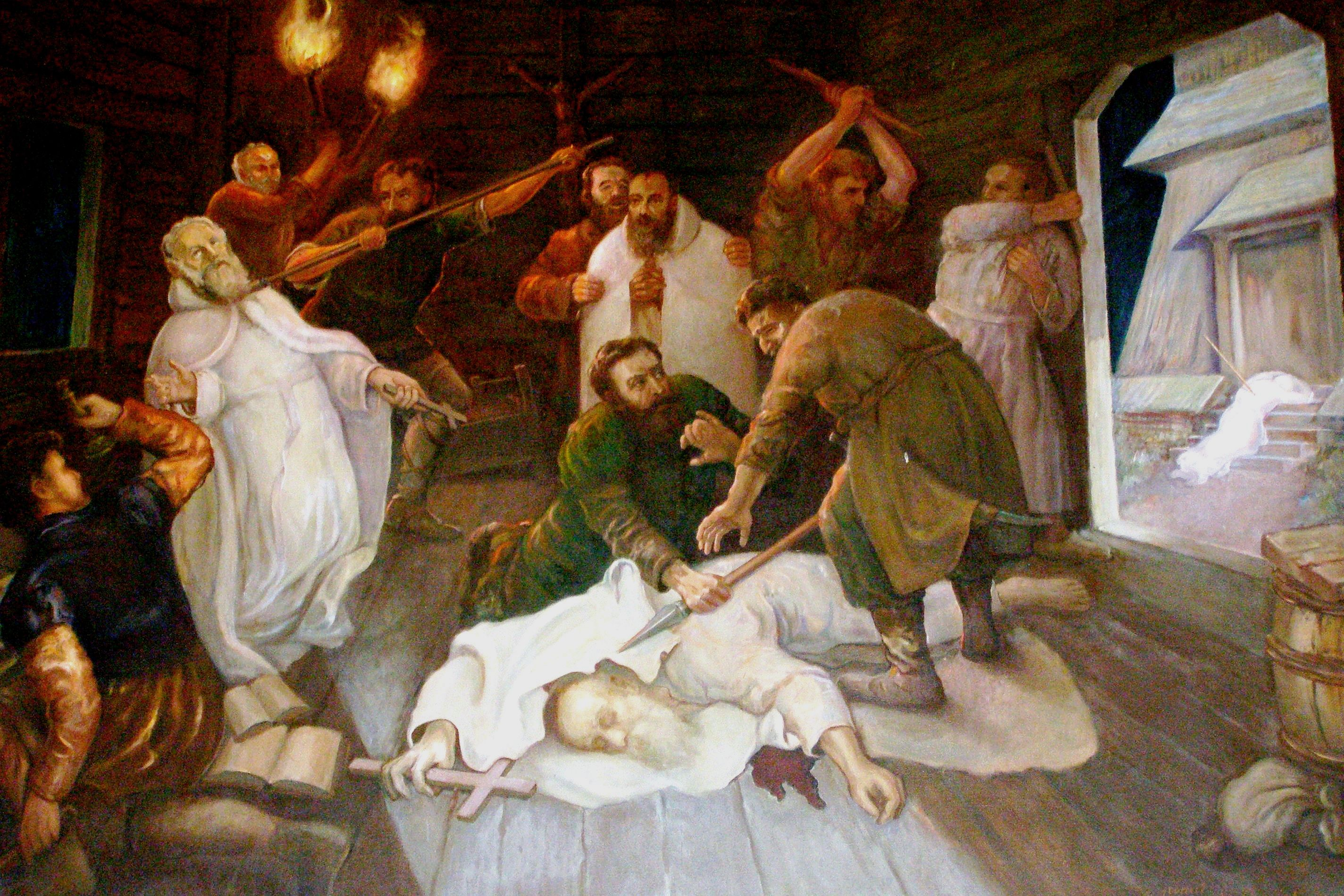
The five brothers martyrs. Founding hermitage in Bieniszew

Stefan Wyszyński, then Primate of Poland, desired personally to have the edifice dedicated to the Poles persecuted for justice; as such, he considered Bydgoszcz area to be particularly predestined for this purpose.

The "Five Martyr Brothers" are Christian hermits:

- Benedict and Jan, two Italian Benedictines;
- Mateusz and Isaac, two Polish novices;
- Krystyn, their Polish helper .

They were murdered during a robbery on the night of November 10, 1003, most likely in the village of Święty Wojciech near Międzyrzecz.

Isaac, Mateusz and Krystyn are the first Polish saints canonized in the history of the Catholic Church. In 1038, the relics of the Five Brothers Martyrs were transported from Gniezno to Prague by Czech soldiers during a plundering expedition to Poland.

In 1987, František Tomášek, then Archbishop of Prague, donated the relics for the new church in Bydgoszcz. Currently, they are exposed for public veneration in the chapel of the Divine Mercy. The reliquary, realized by the artist Robert Kaja, portrays five figures of martyrs supporting a royal crown topped with a cross. Part of the relics is walled up in the main altar.

== Architecture ==
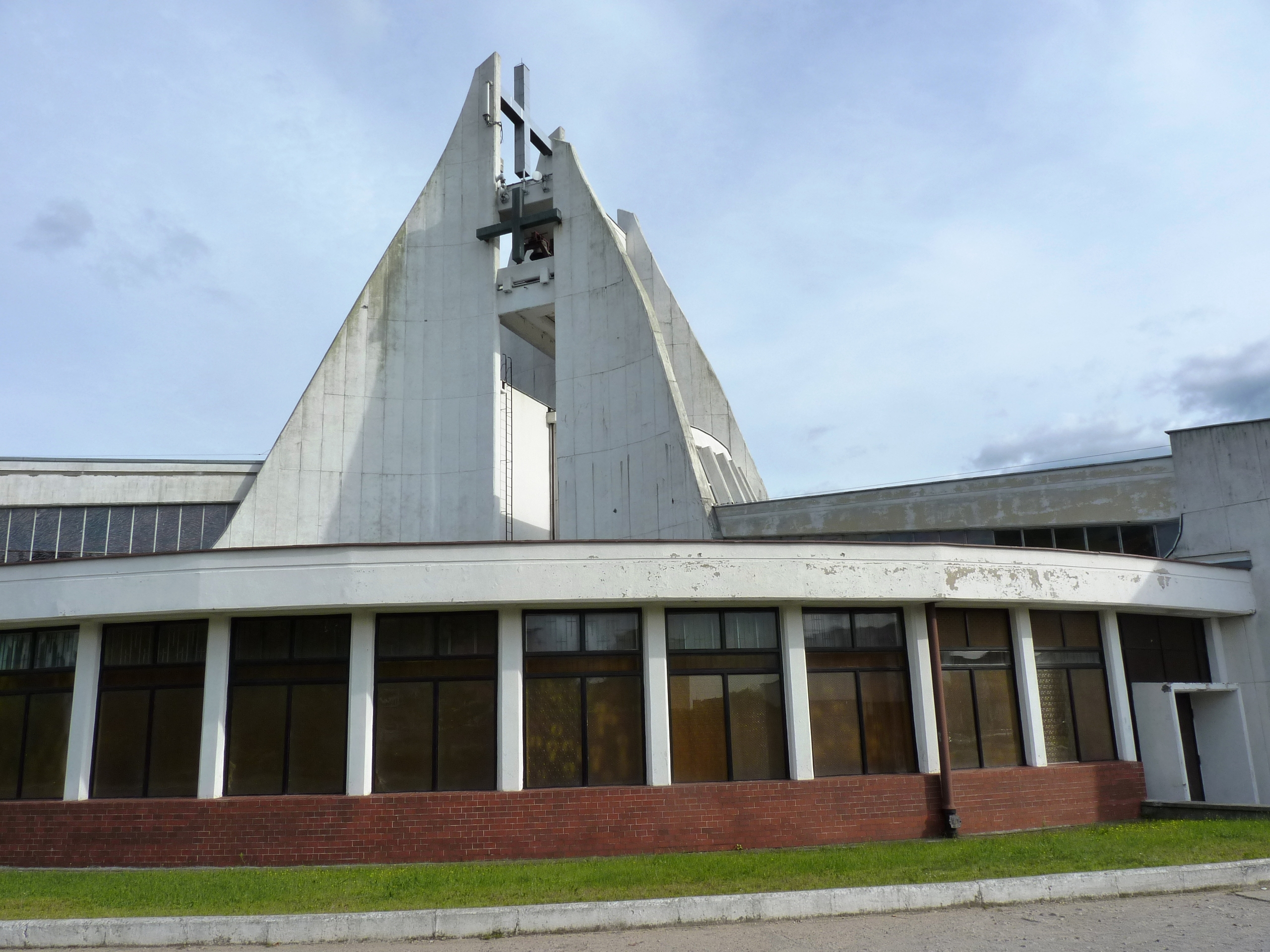
Triangular ship sail-like elements of the roof

The church design refers both to sailing elements and to the evangelical meeting of barges on the lake. The footprint consists of four circle segments with different sizes, having their separating sections above the roofs portrayed as triangular ship sails.

The foundations outlines draw the shape of a chalice, standing on a sacramental bread:

- the small church represents the base of the chalice;
- the main church is the bowl of the chalice;
- the host covers the memorial halls and utility rooms.

Beneath the masts rests the base of the bell tower, topped with a Greek cross. Ceramic bas-reliefs were used to adorn the facade and its interiors.

The surface of the edifice is 3,260 square metres (0.81 acres) and the main church nave area, (1,454 square metres (0.359 acres)), equals Bydgoszcz Basilica's. The bell tower is 29.5 metres (97 ft) high, limited to 30m due to the proximity of the airport approach path. The church can accommodate up to 4,000 people.

In its shape, the Holy Polish Brothers Martyrs church shows similitudes with another Taraszkiewicz's work, "Our Lady Queen of the Rosary Church" in Przymorze district of Gdańsk, built in 1971.

== Church components ==
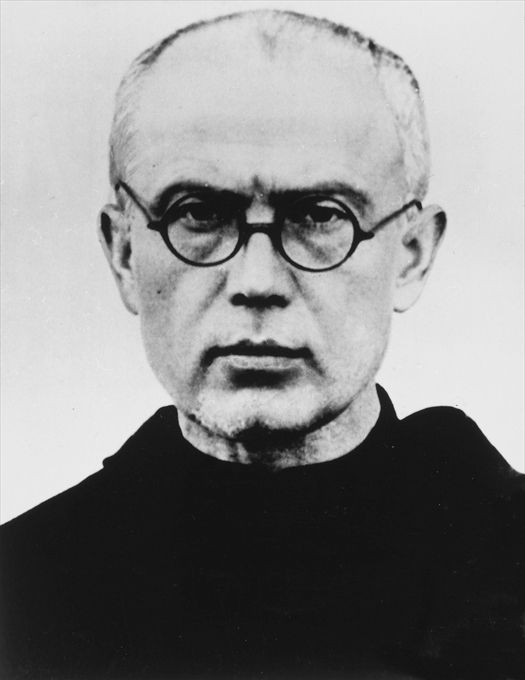
Father Maximilian Kolbe, 1939

- Holy Polish Brothers Martyrs main church (i.e. the main circle). It hosts the main altar, where some of the relics of the Saints are embedded. Bas-reliefs decorate the side walls, they represent:
  - Saint Stanislaus the Martyr;
  - Saint Maximilian Kolbe;
  - Father Jakubowski, a Bydgoszcz priest murdered in September 1939 in a northern forest of the city;
  - Saint Adalbert of Prague;
  - Saint Andrew Bobola;
  - Blessed Father Jerzy Popieluszko.

On the outer walls, bas-reliefs depict national heroes and scenes from the construction of the church. Stained glass windows in the eastern wall quote the eight blessings on which Pope John Paul II based his teaching during his pilgrimage to his homeland in 1999.

- Chapel of the Visitation of Our Lady (Small church). It serves as a chapel for daily services. The oak-paneled walls and the floor sloping down towards the altar render the impression of being inside a boat. The altar carries the replica of "Our Lady of Czestochowa", by Maria Torwirt, surrounded by numerous votive offerings. On the north side is the chapel of Saint Urszula Ledóchowska with her relics, facing the figure and relics of Saint Pio of Pietrelcina. The chapel decor is complemented by stained glass windows with Marian elements.
- Chapel of Remembrance (North Circle). It consists of:
  - Chapel of the Martyrdom of Bydgoszcz, which commemorates the suffering of the city from 1939 to 1945. The floor is made of cobblestones from the Bydgoszcz Stary Rynek covered by the blood of the murdered in September 1939. On the walls are paintings referring to the martyrdom of the inhabitants of Bydgoszcz and a hand mark from the wall of the ex-Jesuit church on Stary Rynek. In the corner stands a triptych: "Our Lady of the Gate of Dawn", "Merciful Jesus" and "December Madonna", by Jerzy Puciata, a local artist. One can also find memorial plaques.
  - Chapel of Blessed Father Jerzy Popiełuszko. It keeps the spirit of the then-martial law. The display cases contain photographs, souvenirs, memorabilia, replicas and drawings from that period. The blessed martyr is represented on photographs from his last service and the liturgical vestments he used are on display.
  - Chapel of the New Martyrs, dedicated to the 108 martyrs who were beatified by John Paul II in Warsaw in 1999. The front wall bears a picture of the Resurrected Christ defeating Satan, under which one can find an urn with soil from the places of execution of Poles during World War II. The list of the 108 martyrs are inscribed on the left wall, while on the right are portraits of the blessed from the Archdiocese of Gniezno. The interiors are decorated with religious sculptures.
  - Papal Chapel, gathering liturgical equipment from the Holy Mass celebrated by John Paul II at the airport of Bydgoszcz on June 7, 1999: the altar, two papal thrones, the chasubles of the Pope and Stanisław Dziwisz, photographs, a copy of the act of granting Honorary Citizenship of Bydgoszcz to John Paul II and a certificate of the planting of the papal oak in 2006.
  - The Chapel of the Martyrs of Our Times, arranged by the visual artist Janusz Karnisza. In the center stands a large cross piercing the ceiling: from it hangs a small portrait of Jerzy Popieluszko. Under the latter are placed relics donated by his mother and the relics of the eleven Sisters of Nazareth, murdered by the Nazis on August 1, 1943, in Novogrudok, Belarus (offered on November 13, 2003, by Archbishop Henryk Muszyński). On the altar stands a replica of the monument from Saint. Brigid Church in Gdańsk, while the main wall bear an image of the Face of Christ and a painting depicting Pilate's judgment over Christ, by the artist Jan Kaja. A map of the world pinpoints the places of modern persecution of Christians.
  - The Memorial Chamber of Primate Stefan Wyszyński
  - An exhibition area retracing the building the church and souvenirs from John Paul II's stay in Bydgoszcz.
- Utility and social rooms make the Southern circle.

== Surroundings ==
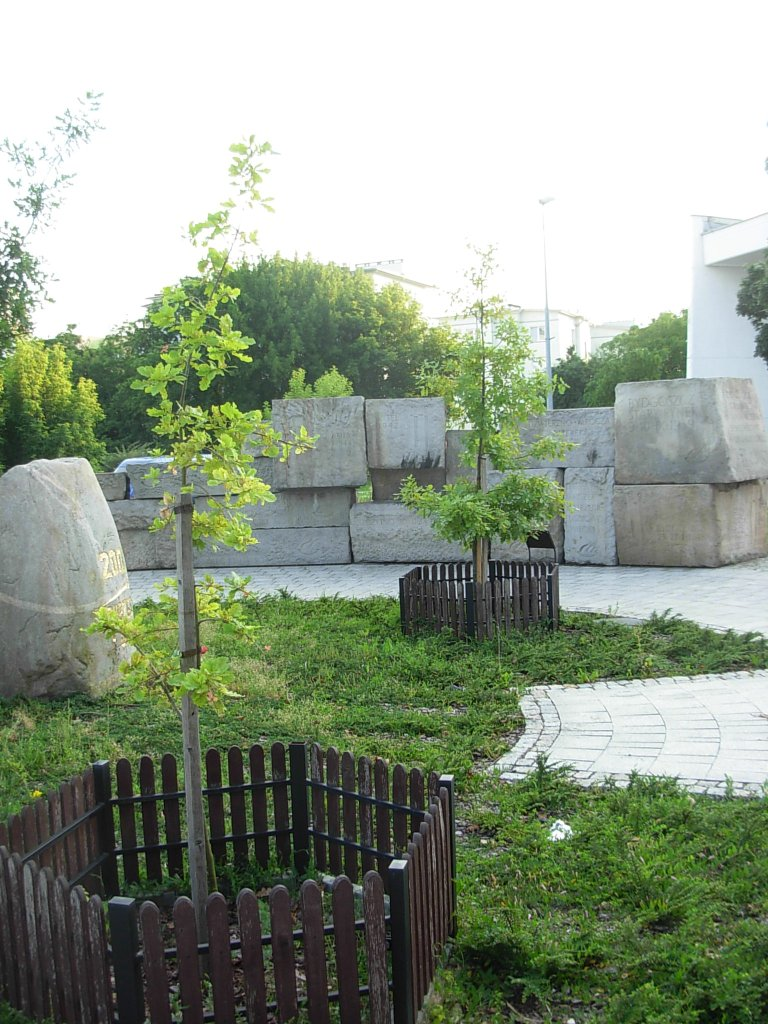
Commemorative oaks

- Monument to Father Jerzy Popiełuszko by Jacek Marek Krzyżyński from Otłoczyn, unveiled on October 19, 1985.
- Figure of Our Lady of the Immaculate Conception, unveiled on May 3, 1986, in the very place where Father Popiełuszko set off on his last journey.
- Symbolic stones commemorating places of execution of Poles (e.g. Katyn, Siberia).
- Earthwork with names of places commemorating the struggle and martyrdom of Poles during the German occupation. Initially (September 5, 1969) placed nearby the "Monument to Struggle and Martyrdom" (Polish: Pomnik Walki i Męczeństwa Ziemi Bydgoskiej) on Stary Rynek in Bydgoszcz, it was moved to the vicinity of the church in September 2007.
- A boulder, with the inscription "2000 years of Christianity". It comes from the ornamentation of John Paul II's altar at Bydgoszcz airport (June 5, 1999).
- Three oaks planted on November 11, 2000. The first celebrates 2000 years of Christianity, the second is dedicated to John Paul II, the third commemorates the Primate of the Millennium, Cardinal Stefan Wyszyński.
- Bas-reliefs on the church commemorating the struggle of Poles for freedom during the period between the Bar Confederation and the Warsaw Uprising.
- A burnt oak stump together with a shrine stand for the destructive wars, thoughtlessness and vandalism of modern times.

== Other elements ==
- Bells

Three bells stand in the church tower, they have been made in 1980 by bell founder Antoni Kruszyński, from the foundry of the Kruszewski Brothers in Węgrów. They were lifted up to the tower in March 1981.

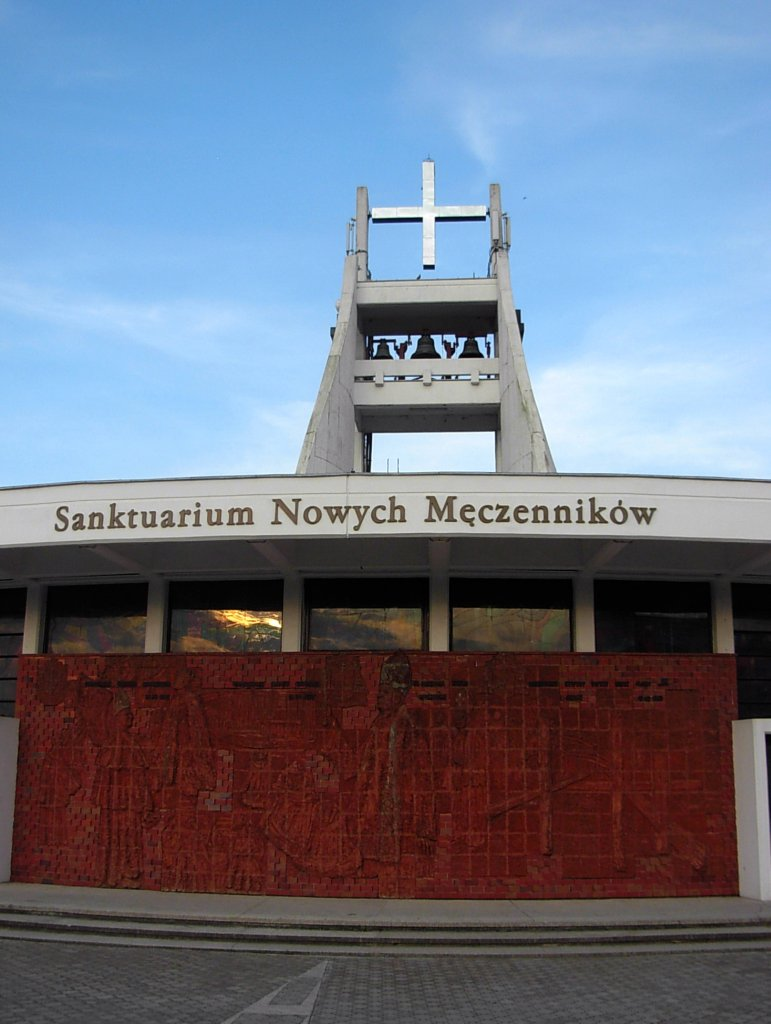
Bells tower

  - The largest, with an E note, weights 1,700 kilograms (270 st) and bears the inscription: Bell funded by the inhabitants of Bydgoszcz to commemorate the martyrdom of 40,000 inhabitants murdered in 1939-1945 - on the other side, it reads: I am calling you and also have love.
  - The second bell, G-noted, with a mass of 900 kilograms (140 st), has been named "Mary". Under the name an inscription reads: Bell funded by the faithful of the parish of St. Polish Brothers Martyrs in Bydgoszcz to commemorate the Visitation of the Parish by "Our Lady of Czestochowa" on June 10, 1978 - the opposite side bears: Here is the Mother of our trust.
  - The third bell, with an H note and a mass of 550 kilograms (87 st) is named "Romuald". Inscriptions read Bell funded by the first parish priest of St. Polish Brothers Martyrs in Bydgoszcz Father Romuald Biniak and Preach the glory of the goodness of working people who built this temple.

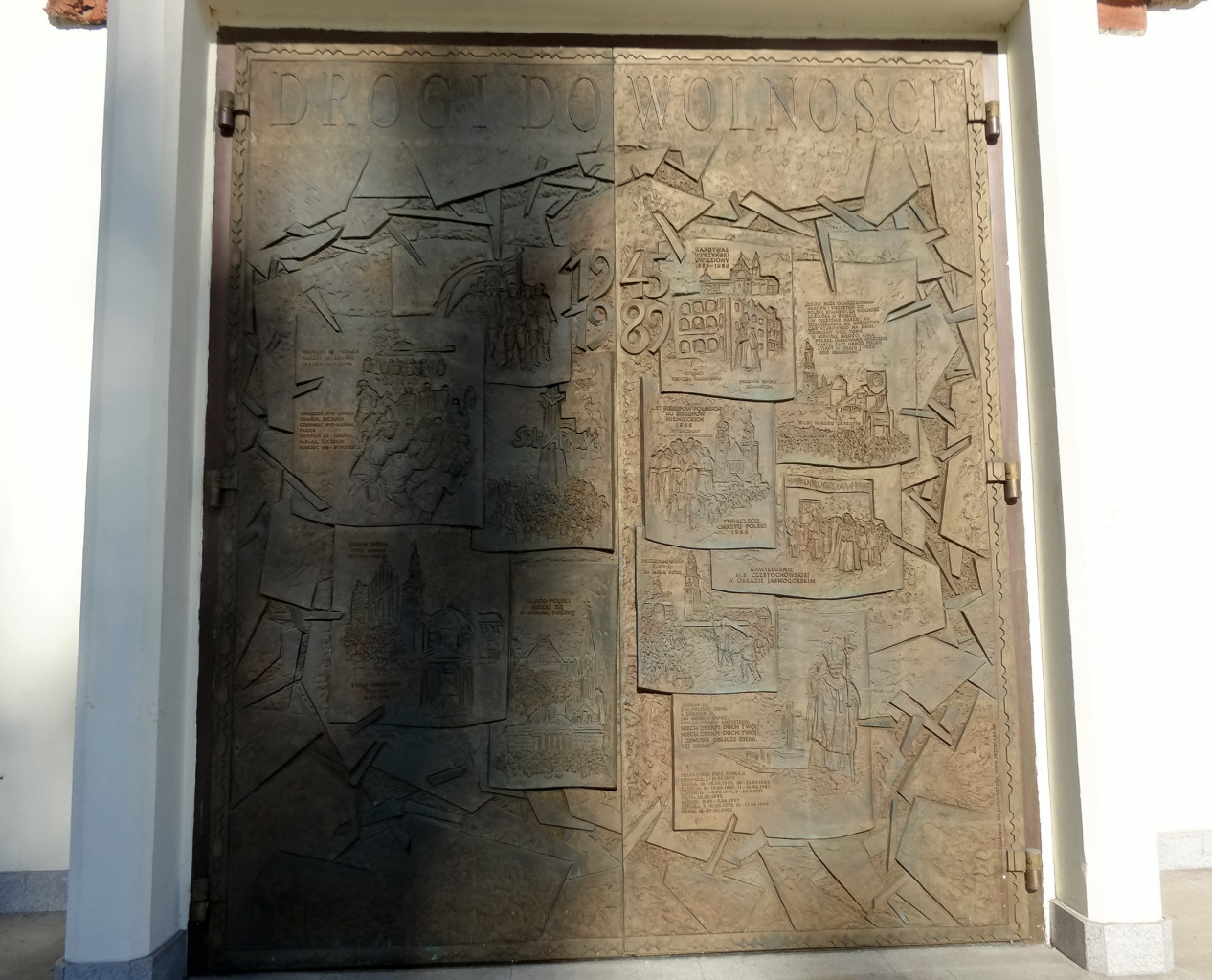
Main bronze doors

- Bronze doors

In the middle of the church stands a large two-sided commemorative bronze door, realized by sculptor Jacek Kucaba. It has been consecrated on October 19, 2009, by Cardinal Józef Glemp. On the inside, the carved scenes commemorate the life and mission of Blessed Father Jerzy Popieluszko (ordination, preachings, last Holy Mass in Bydgoszcz, kidnapping, torture and funeral). On the outside are paintings entitled "Roads to Freedom 1945-1989", depicting the uprisings and the church-led road that guided Poles to freedom.

The four remaining entrance doors, forged by the artist Marek Rona, display Polish eagles from various periods of history: Henryk IV Probus's tombstone, Casimir III the Great's rule, Władysław II Jagiełło and Sigismund I the Old era, Stephen Báthory and John III Sobieski time, Stanisław August Poniatowski reign and the emblem of the Second Polish Republic (1919–1927).

- Pipe organ

The church organ was built by Bronisław Cepka from Wronki. Originally, the instrument was intended for a church in Warsaw. However, these plans did not come to fruition and eventually the pieces were transferred to the church of St. Polish Brothers Martyrs. The organ features 3,500 pipes, 43 voices, including Spanish bells and trumpets. The instrument was blessed on December 2, 1995, by Cardinal Józef Glemp. The organ is adorned with a statue of "Our Lady of Ludźmierz". The upper balustrade is decorated with several coats of arms and the Piast Eagle.

- Baptismal font

The baptismal font, set outside the presbytery, is made of a uniform granite block flanked by three doors referring to the Trinity. Its author is the artist Michał Kubiak.

== Gallery ==
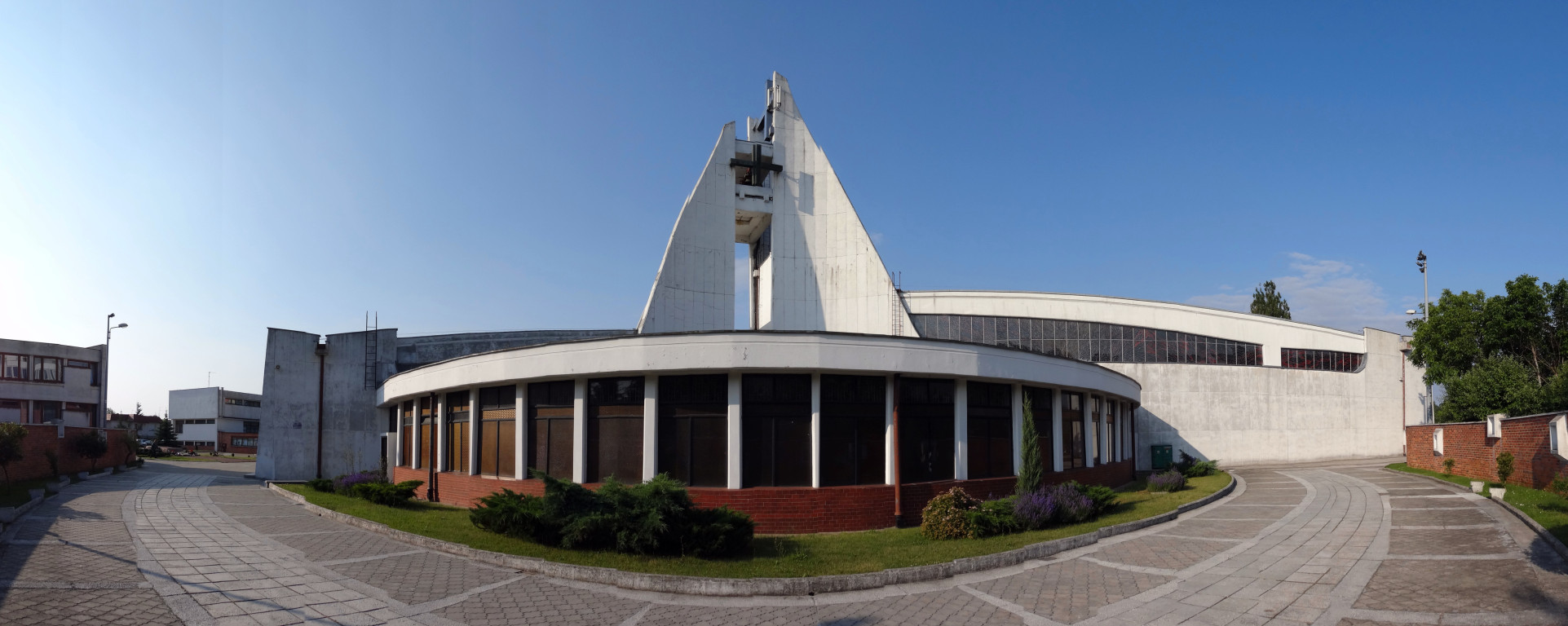
Panoramic view

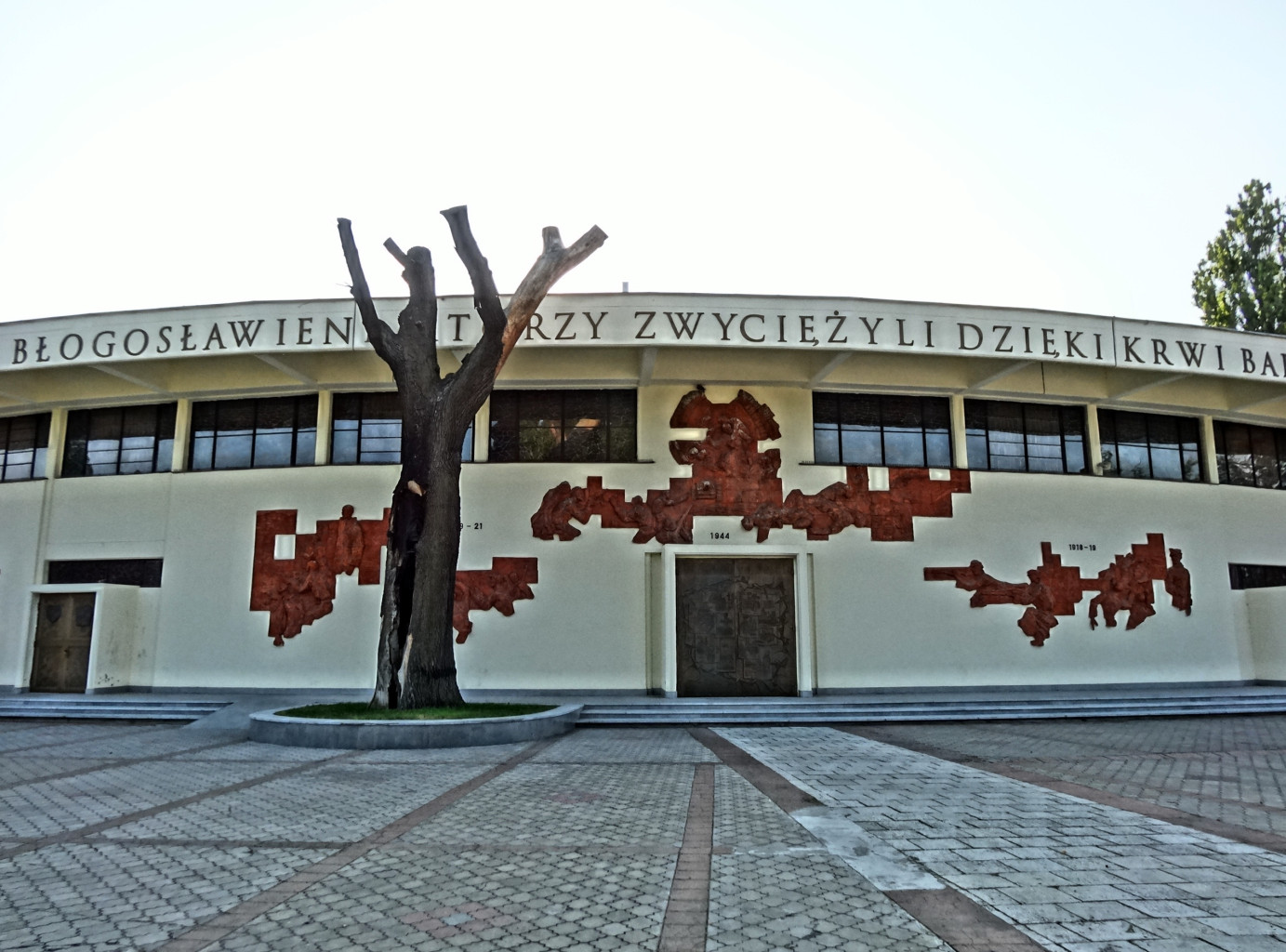
Entrance with the burnt oak stump

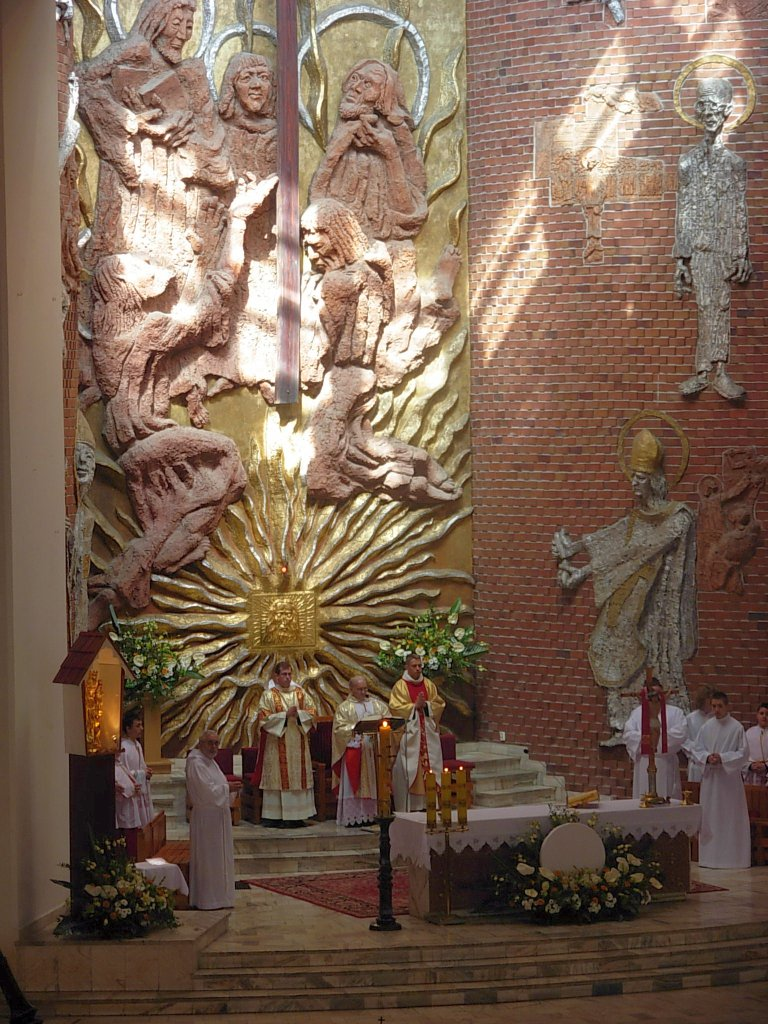
Interiors - Main altar

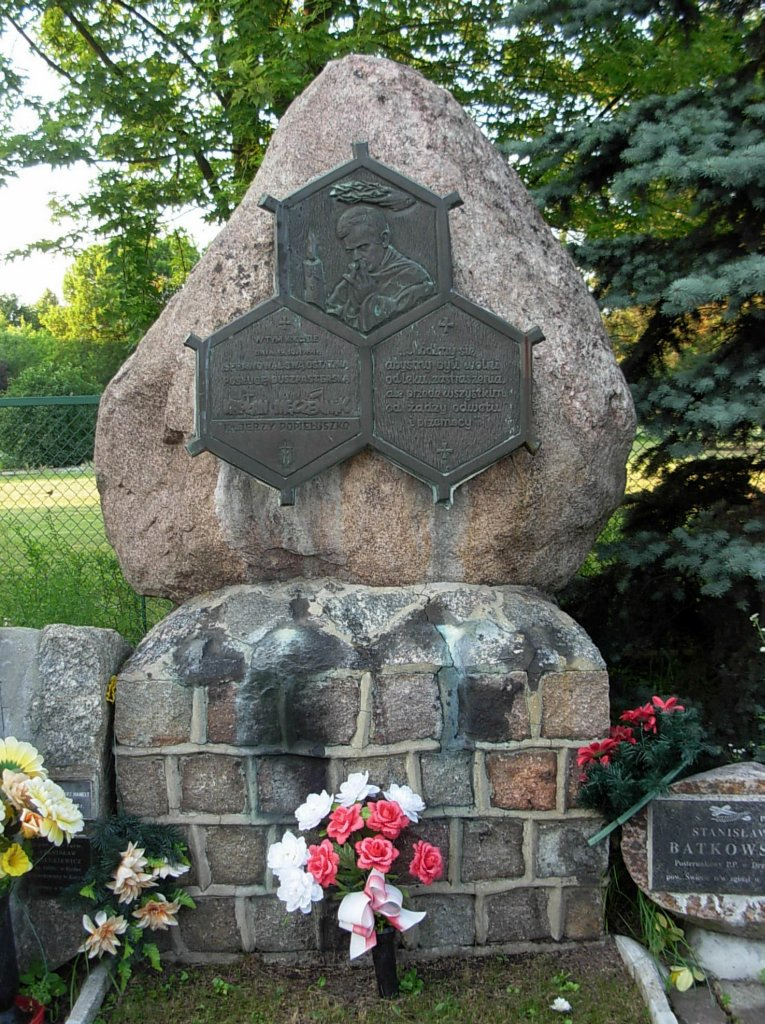
Monument to Father Jerzy Popiełuszko

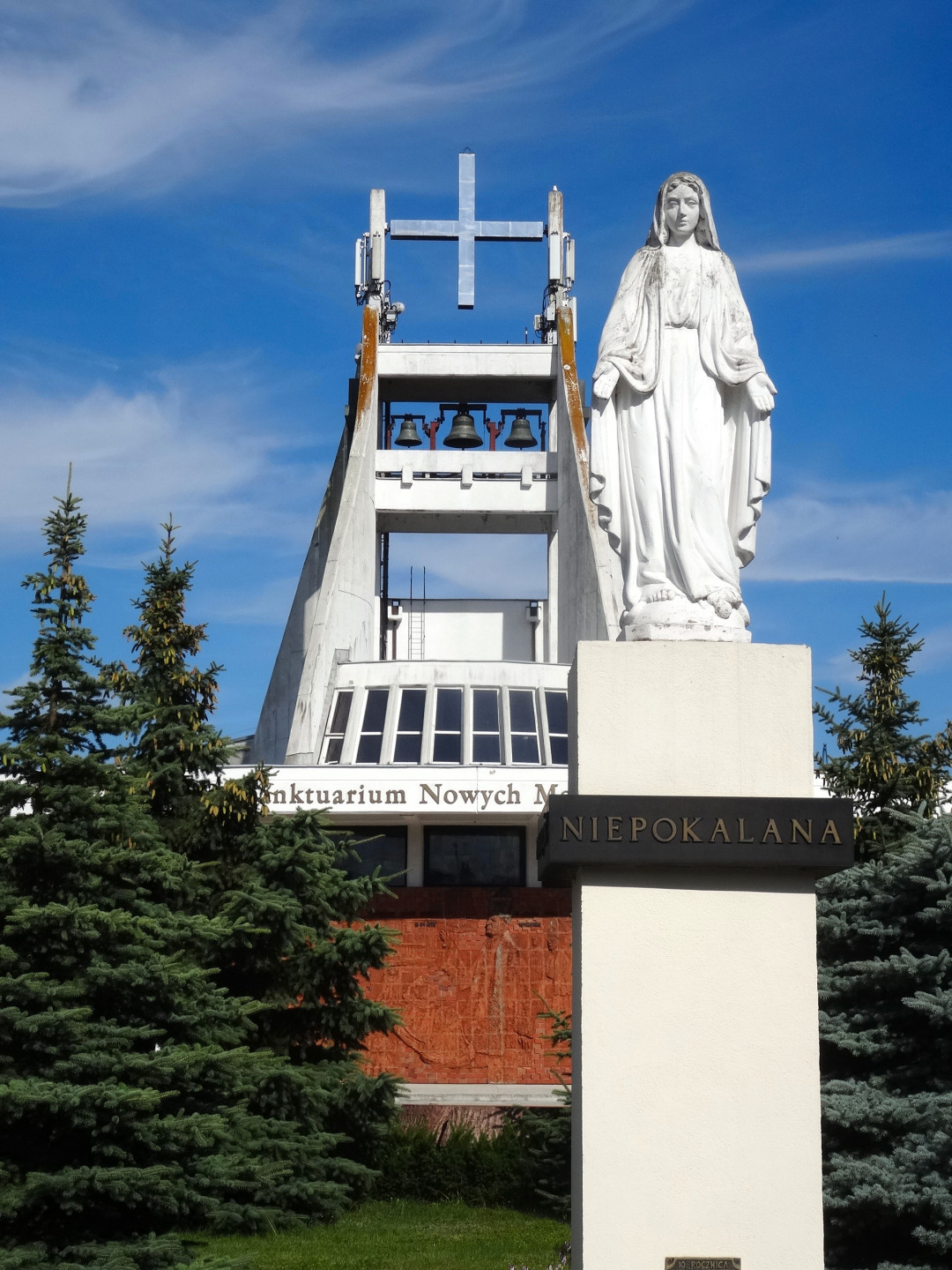
Our Lady of the Immaculate Conception

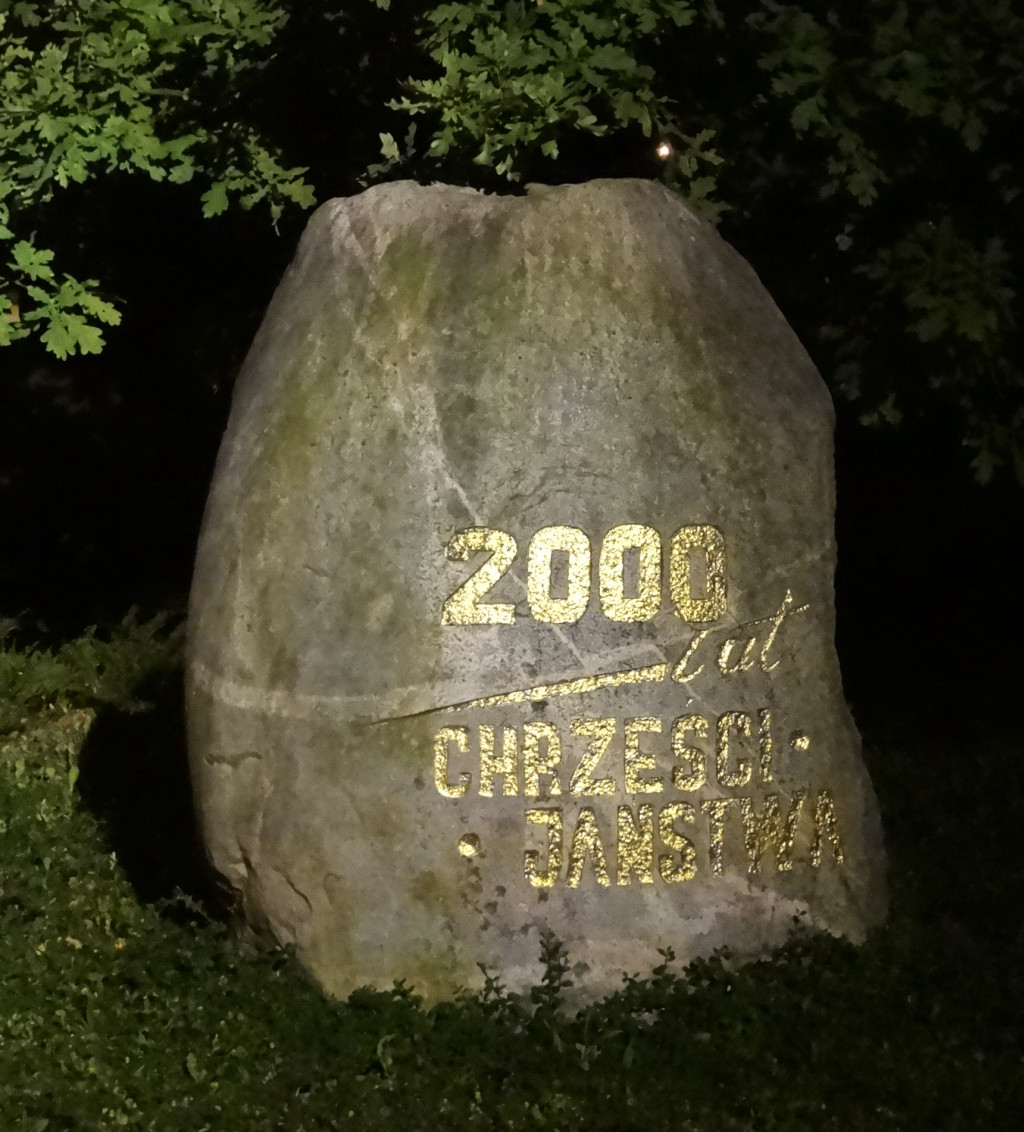
"2000 years of Christianity" Stone

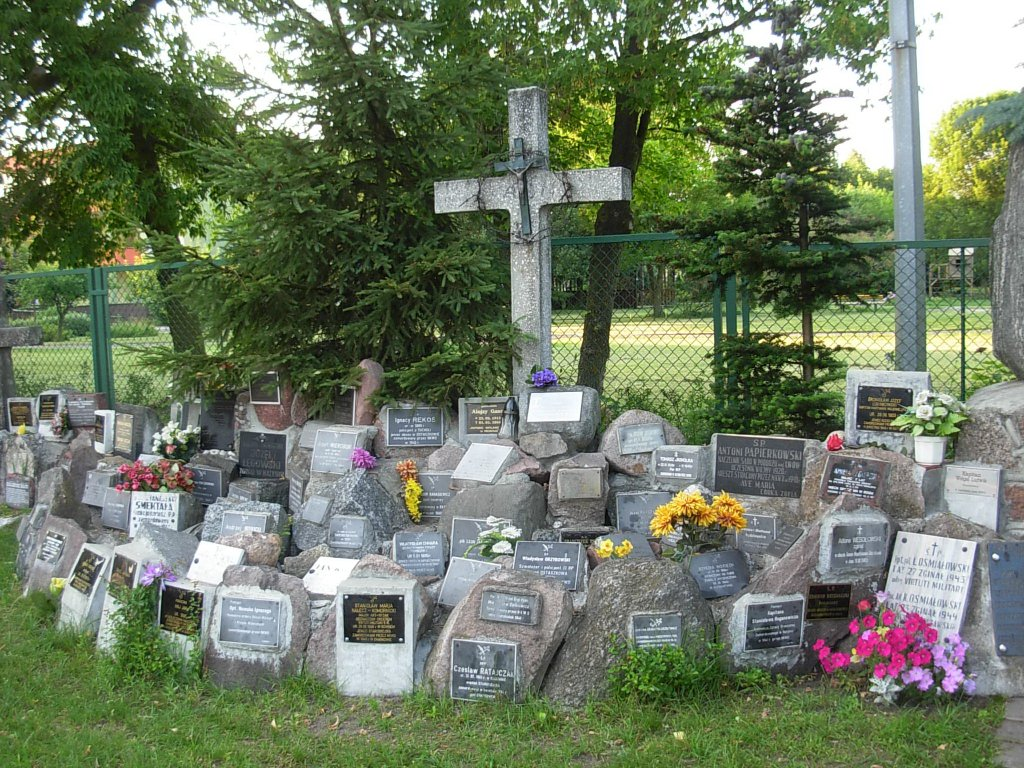
Symbolic stones

== See also ==
- Bydgoszcz
- The five Brothers Martyrs
- Stefan Wyszyński
- Katyn massacre
- Jerzy Popiełuszko
- Last rosary mass of Jerzy Popiełuszko

== Bibliography ==
- Biniak, Romuald (2010). Sanktuarium Nowych Męczenników, Świątynia Modlitwy i Pamięci. Rok 2010 [Sanctuary of the New Martyrs, Temple of Prayer and Remembrance. Year 2010] (in Polish). Bydgoszcz: Pejzaż. ISBN 9788361641568.
- Misterek, Henryk (1991). Wspomnienia z budowy kościoła Św. Polskich Braci Męczenników w Bydgoszczy. Kalendarz Bydgoski [Memories of the construction of the church of St. Polish Brothers Martyrs in Bydgoszcz. Bydgoszcz calendar] (in Polish). Bydgoszcz: Towarzystwo Miłośników Miasta Bydgoszczy. pp. 180–182.
- Jastrzębska-Puzowska, Iwona (2009). Kościół pw. Świętych Polskich Braci Męczenników w Bydgoszczy – modernizm w powojennej architekturze sakralnej. Materiały do dziejów kultury i sztuki Bydgoszczy i regionu. zeszyt 14 [Church of Holy Polish Brothers Martyrs in Bydgoszcz - modernism in post-war sacral architecture. Materials for the history of culture and art of Bydgoszcz and the region. notebook 14.] (in Polish). Bydgoszcz: Pracownia dokumentacji i popularyzacji zabytków wojewódzkiego ośrodka kultury w Bydgoszczy. pp. 180–182.
