= Parisius =

Italian Roman Catholic saint

Saint Parisius
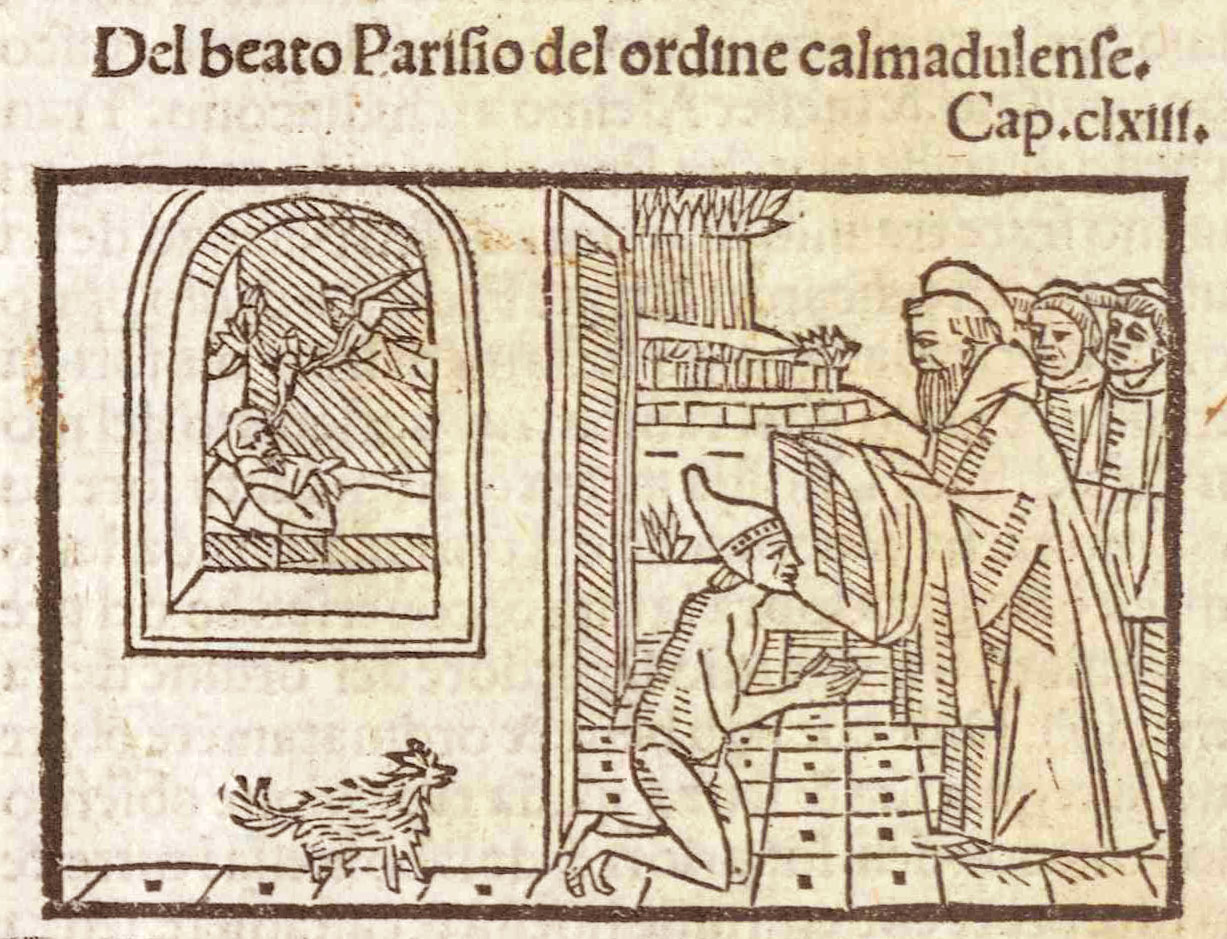
- Parisius in the Golden Legend (1497)
- Born: 1160; Treviso or Bologna, Italy
- Died: 1267; Treviso, Italy
- Venerated in: Camaldolese Order, Roman Catholic Church, Diocese of Treviso
- Major shrine: Cathedral of St. Peter, Treviso
- Feast: 11 June

Parisius (Italian: Parisio) was a Camaldolese monk and spiritual director.

It is believed that Parisius was born in 1160, at either Treviso or Bologna. At the age of twelve, Parisius entered the Camaldolese order. Shortly after being ordained a priest in 1191, Parisius was appointed as the spiritual director of the nuns of the Order at the Monastery of St. Christina in Treviso. He remained in this ministry for the remaining seventy years of his life.

During his life, many miracles were credited to his intercession, and he is reported to have had the gift of prophecy. After his death, he was buried in the Cathedral of St. Peter in Treviso.
