= Camaldolese =

Monastic communities of the Order of Saint Benedict

The term Camaldolese, in the context of Catholic institutes of consecrated life of pontifical right, refers to institutes tracing their origin to the Holy Hermitage (Italian: Sacro Eremo) founded by St. Romuald in Camaldoli, high in the mountains of Tuscany, Italy, near the city of Arezzo. The two extant institutes are the Camaldolese Benedictine Congregation—a component of the Benedictine Confederation whose members use the postnominals OSB Cam.—and the Camadolese Hermits of Mount Corona (Latin: Congregatio Eremitarum Camaldulensium Montis Coronae), whose members use the postnominals ECMC. Apart from the Catholic monasteries and hermitages, ecumenical Christian hermitages with a Camaldolese spirituality have arisen as well.

== History ==
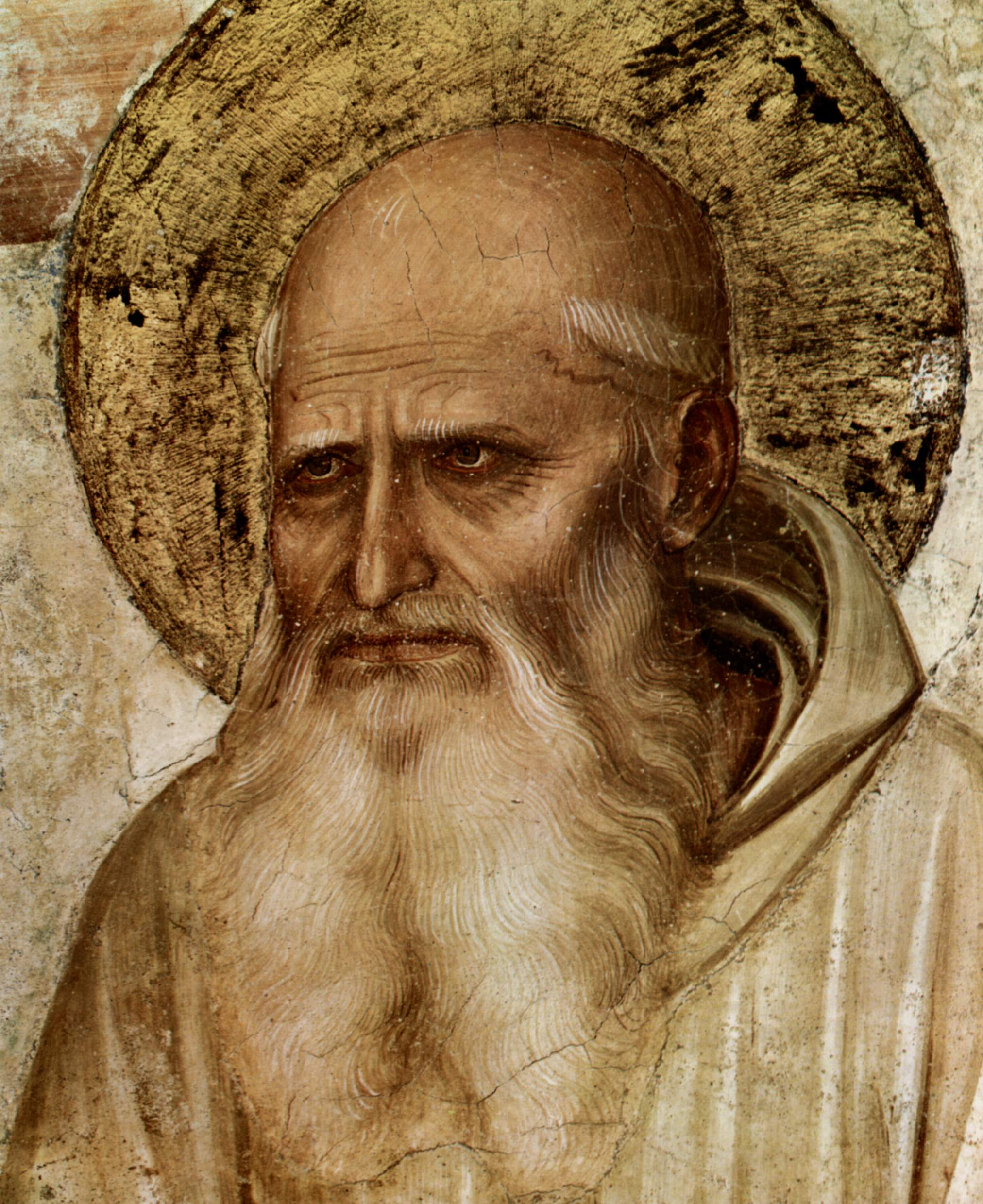
St. Romuald

The Camaldolese were established through the efforts of the Italian monk Saint Romuald (c. 950-1025/27). His reform sought to renew and integrate the eremitical tradition of monastic life with that of the cenobium.

In his youth, Romuald became acquainted with the three major schools of Western monastic tradition. The monastery where he first entered monastic life, Sant' Apollinare in Classe, was a traditional Benedictine community under the influence of the Cluniac reforms. Romuald chose to be under a spiritual master, Marinus, who followed a much harsher ascetic and solitary lifestyle that was originally of Irish eremitical origins. Some years later, Marinus and Romuald settled near the Abbey of Saint Michael de Cuxa, where Abbot Guarinus was also beginning reforms but was building mainly upon the Iberian Christian tradition. Later, drawing on his various early experiences, Romuald was able to establish his own monastic pattern, though he himself never thought of it as a separate entity, seeing it as an integral part of the Benedictine tradition.

Romuald moved around central Italy, founding several colonies of hermits (or "deserts"). Around the year 1012, he made his chief foundation, the Sacred Hermitage of Camaldoli in the Tuscan hills. There the monks lived in individual cells, but also observed the common life, with liturgical celebrations daily in the community church and common meals in the refectory. The monks at Camaldoli adopted the distinctive white habit, later characteristic of their tradition, and there emerged in these early years the combination of the two cenobite and hermit branches that afterwards became so marked a feature of the order.

Romuald and the early Camaldolese exercised considerable influence on the religious movements of their time. The emperors Otto III and Henry II esteemed Romuald highly and sought his advice on religious questions.

In his old age Romuald started on a missionary expedition to Hungary with twenty-five of his monks, but he was unable to accomplish the journey, and he died in 1027. The order was approved by Pope Alexander II in 1072.

There have been Camaldolese hermitages and monasteries at sites throughout Italy.

== Organization ==
=== Current institutes ===
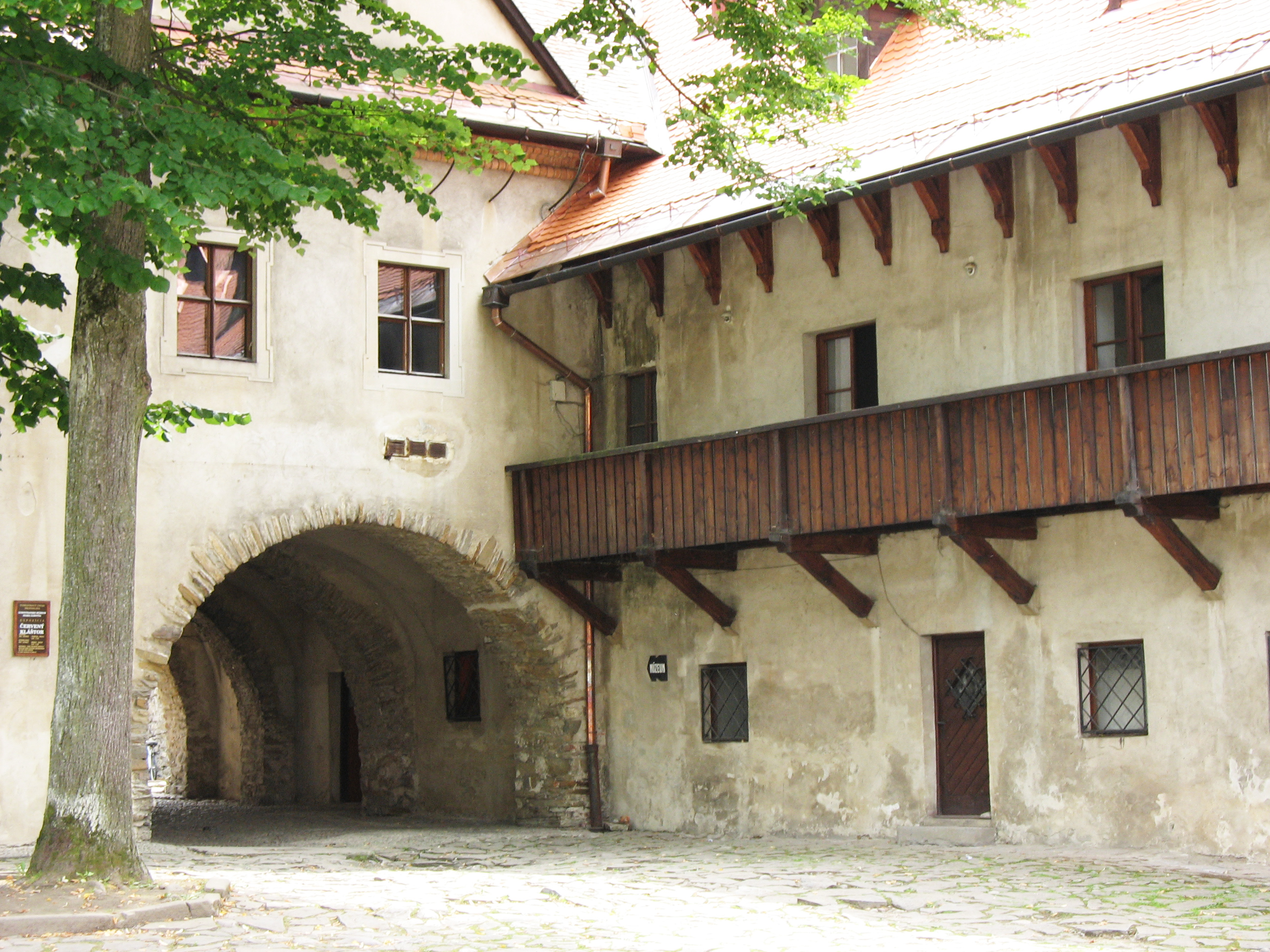
Former Camaldolese monastery in Červený Kláštor in Slovakia

Currently two separate Camaldolese institutes of consecrated life exist: the Camaldolese Benedictine Congregation and the Camaldolese Hermits. Various unsuccessful attempts at reunion between them occurred over the centuries - the longest-lasting that of 1634–1667. In 1667, Pope Clement IX, recognizing the failure, issued a Bull establishing a definitive separation between the congregations.

==== Camaldolese Benedictine Congregation ====
The Camaldolese Benedictine Congregation (OSB Cam.) is headquartered in the hamlet of Camaldoli in Tuscany. On the mountainside stands the 11th-century Holy Hermitage founded by St. Romuald. Its 16th-century monastery stands a few kilometers below.

The next community founded by the Camaldolese congregation was the Monastery of St. Mary of the Angels in Florence. By the 13th century, its scriptorium had become known throughout Europe as a major source of high-quality parchments, then much in demand. In this monastery the artist Lorenzo Monaco tentatively explored a vocation as a monk from 1390 onwards. Only the church of the monastery now remains in service.

Circa 1603 the Camaldolese Hermit Monastery in Kraków in Poland was established in the village of Bielany (now surrounded by Kraków). The priory consists of hermitages and the Church of Our Lady of the Assumption. Visitors are welcome for scheduled masses.

The New Camaldoli Hermitage on the coast road south of Big Sur, California, was founded in 1958 by the Holy Hermitage of Camaldoli, Italy. Officially named the "Immaculate Heart Hermitage", it stands on a mountainside overlooking the Pacific Ocean. New Camaldoli has founded two daughter communities, Incarnation Monastery in Berkeley, California, near the GTU, north of U.C. Berkeley in 1979; and the Monastery of the Risen Christ in San Luis Obispo, California in 2014.

The order maintains a mix of monasteries and hermitages for men in countries on five continents. Perhaps most prominent is Saccidananda Ashram, founded in 1950 in the village of Tannirpalli in the Tiruchirapalli District of Tamil Nadu, India, on the bank of the River Kavery. Monasteries for women began in 1086; they are located now mostly in Italy and Poland, also in Tanzania and America. An oblate community started in Australia, which since the mid-1990s continues under the guidance of the Prior New Camaldoli, Big Sur.

==== Camaldolese Hermits of Mount Corona ====
Camaldolese Hermits of Mount Corona
- Congregatio Eremitarum Camaldulensium Montis Coronae (Latin)
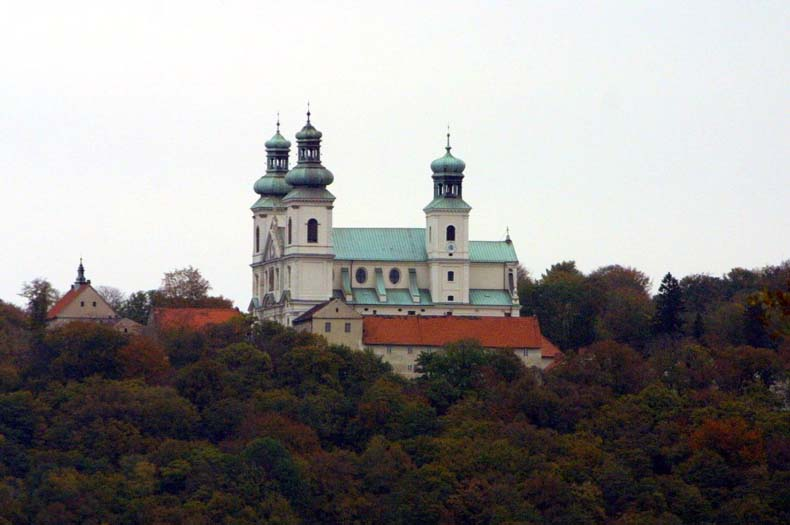
- Camaldolese Priory of Bielany in Kraków, Poland
- Abbreviation: Post-nominal letters: E.C.M.C.
- Formation: 1523; 503 years ago
- Founder: Saint Romuald and Blessed Paul Giustiniani
- Founded at: Camaldoli, Italy
- Type: Monastic Order of Pontifical Right (for Men)
- Headquarters: Sacro Eremo Tuscolano, 00040 Monteporzio Catone, Italy
- Members: 67 members (35 priests) as of 2018
- Father Major: Fr. Emir José Castillo Zárate, ECMC
- Affiliations: Catholic Church
- Website: www.catholic-hierarchy.org/diocese/dqecm.html

The other institute, known as the Camaldolese Hermits of Mount Corona, was established by the Renaissance reformer Paul Giustiniani (1476-1528). This group lives solely in hermitages, usually with a very small number of monks comprising the community. There are three houses in Italy, two in Poland, and one each in Spain, the United States, and Colombia, as well as a newer foundation in Venezuela. Unlike the other institute, it is not a member of the larger Benedictine Confederation.

- Eremo Di San Girolamo (Monte Cucco), founded in 1521, does not have the separate, solitary cells typical of the other Coronese Hermitages.
- Eremo SS. Annunziata Di Monte Rua, founded in 1537, served as the center of various Coronese Hermitages in the former Republic of Venice.
- Sacro Eremo Tuscolano, founded in 1607 at Frascati in the Alban Hills, ordinarily functions as the residence of the father major (superior general) and as the novitiate house for Italy.
- Eremo Di Monte Argentino, the "Silver Mountain", was founded in 1609 in the outskirts of Cracow, Poland. Pope John Paul II visited it in August 2002.
- Eremo Cinque Martiri in Bieniszew in Poland was founded in 1663. In 1941 the hermitage was suppressed by the Nazis; three hermits died in concentration camps. It is presently the novitiate house for Poland.
- Yermo Camaldulense N.S. De Herrera, Burgos, Spain, was founded in 1925 on the site of an ancient Cistercian abbey. It is a novitiate house.
- Holy Family Hermitage in Bloomingdale, Ohio, was founded in the Diocese of Steubenville in 1959. Nine solitary cells stand, according to historical models, in a semicircle about the church. It is a novitiate house.
- Yermo Camaldulense de la Santa Cruz in Antioquia, Colombia, was founded in 1969. It is a novitiate house.
- Yermo Camaldulense Santa Maria de Los Angeles, Venezuela

The Camaldolese Crown (Italian: Corona), designed by Bl. Michele Pina (1450–1522), is sometimes called the Crown of Our Lord (Italian: Corona Del Signore). It was officially approved by papal brief on 18 February 1516.

=== Extinct congregations ===
An early Benedictine Camaldolese site was founded in Florence, St. Mary of the Angels.

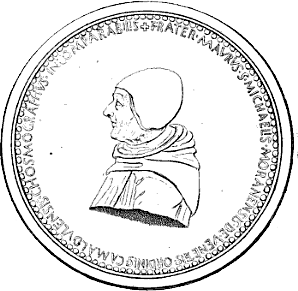
Fra Mauro of the Camaldolese Monastery of St. Michael in Murano, Venice (c. 1459)

Previously there were three autonomous congregations, based in Turin (founded 1596), Venice (1474–1569) and France (founded 1526). The monasteries attached to Hermitage of Turin seem to have been absorbed by the Monte Corona congregation in the 18th century. The Venetian congregation, which was headed by an abbot, and the French one were eventually suppressed by the Holy See. The French monks became associated with Jansenism, due to which their congregation was suppressed in 1770 and the monks dispersed.

By the early 20th century, the Venetian congregation, which was entirely coenobitic, was felt by Rome to be too few in numbers for continued existence, and its members were offered the opportunity to seek admission with the Congregation of Camaldoli. It had contributed many of its members to the service of the Church, most notably Pope Gregory XVI. The noted cartographer Fra Mauro had been a member of the mother monastery of St. Michael of Murano. It was in this community that the German merchant Daniel became a monk. Eventually, he established a solitary hermitage in the woods, where he spent long periods in prayer. He was murdered in his cell by robbers in 1413 and is today venerated as Saint Daniel of Murano.

In the Kingdom of Hungary, four Camaldolese monasteries were established: Zobor Hill (1695), Lánzsér (German: Landsee) (1701), Vöröskolostor (1710) and Majk (1733). In 1782 the Emperor Joseph II ordered the dissolution of every monastic order that, in his view, did not pursue useful activities. Thus the Camaldolese monasteries in that realm were secularized.

== Communities of nuns ==
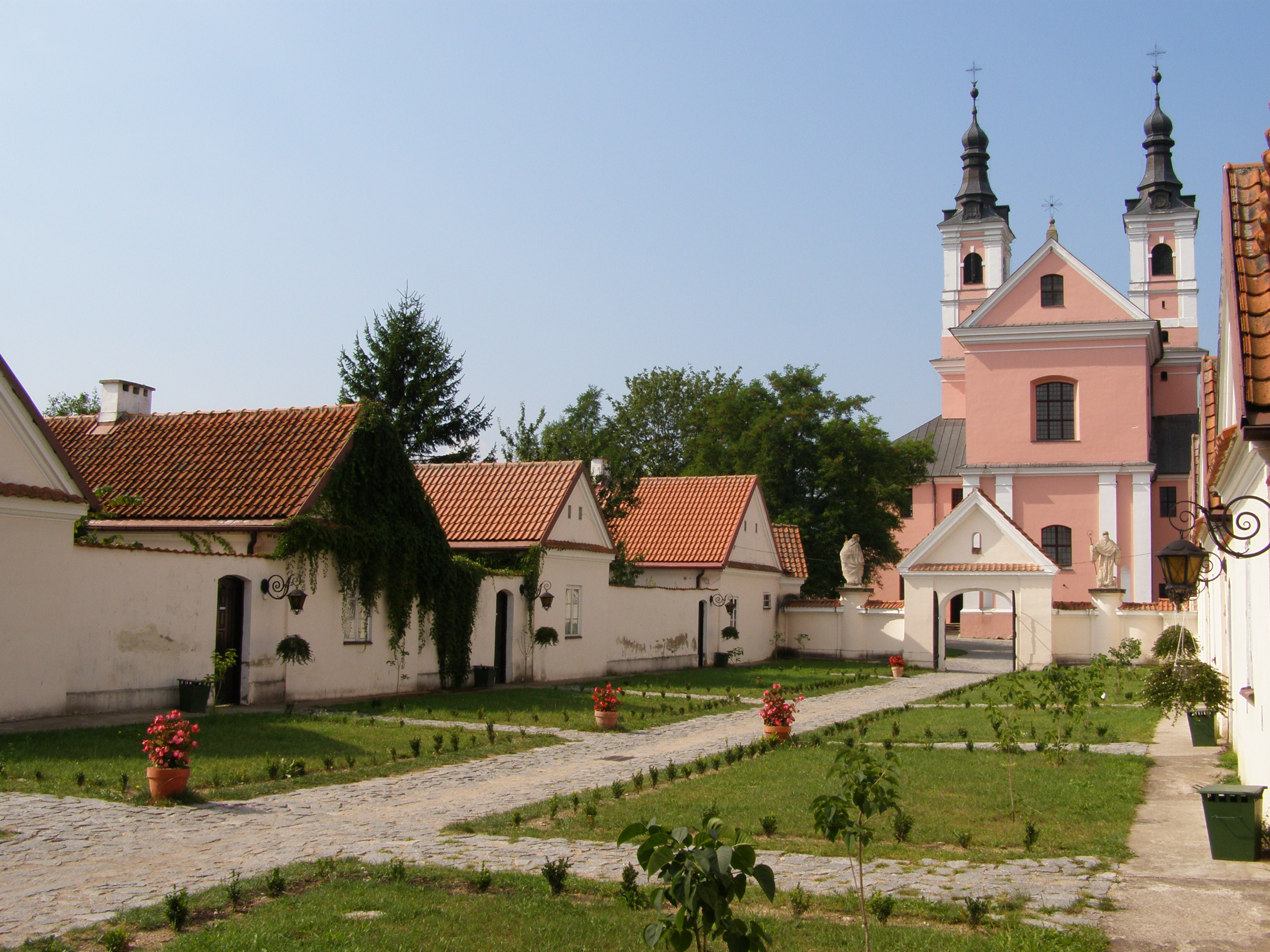
Former Camaldolese hermitage in Wigry, Poland

Soon after the various communities established by St. Romuald began to develop, communities of nuns desired to share in this reform. Beginning under the guidance of Blessed Rudolph II, third Prior General of Camaldoli, they were accepted into the life of the Congregation. He founded the Monastery of San Pietro di Luco in Mugello near Florence to establish the model of their "Little Rule" in 1086.

At their zenith, only ten monasteries of nuns were a part of the Order. There were many small monasteries, however, which followed the Camaldolese Rule but were subject to local bishops. Of those who form a part of the Congregation of the Holy Hermitage, their Motherhouse is the Abbey of St. Anthony the Abbot in Rome, where the abbess lives.

Over time the Camaldolese nuns came to be concentrated mostly in Italy and in Poland, in Złoczew. A few foundations, though, have been made in other countries. In France, a monastery of nuns was established by Polish nuns of the Order but it is on the verge of closure, with just one nun in residence. A monastery has been founded in Tanzania, which is currently flourishing.

Founded in 1979 by three Sisters, in Windsor, New York, Transfiguration Monastery became formally affiliated with the Camaldolese Benedictine Congregation in 1986. Sister Mary Donald Corcoran, O.S.B. Cam., has served as prioress since its foundation, which she made with two companions, Sisters Placid (a former recluse from France) and Jean Marie Pearse, a native of the region. For practical reasons, they have begun the process of changing their affiliation to an American Benedictine congregation, while still retaining Camaldolese traditions.

== Modern era ==
The Benedictine Camaldolese order extended its presence to the United States in 1958 with the founding of Immaculate Heart Hermitage, more commonly called New Camaldoli Hermitage, in the Santa Lucia Mountains of Big Sur, California. New Camaldoli Hermitage later established a daughter house, Incarnation Monastery in Berkeley, California. Fr. Cyprian Consiglio is the current Prior at New Camadoli Hermitage of Big Sur.

The Camaldolese Hermits of Monte Corona established the Holy Family Hermitage in Bloomingdale, Ohio. For several years, there was also a small community, Epiphany Monastery, in New Boston, New Hampshire, which was closed in 1998.

There are Camaldolese communities in India, Brazil, and Tanzania, among others.

An ecumenical Christian community of Camaldolese solitaries is present in various countries throughout the world and is known as the Community of Solitude (CoS). The Camaldolese Oblate Community of Australasia is another ecumenical community.

== Saints and Blesseds of the Order ==
Saints

- Pietro I Orseolo (c. 928 – 10 January 987), Doge of Venice who later became a monk, canonized on 2 May 1731
- Benedetto, Giovanni, Matteo, Isaaco, and Cristino, (died 10/11 November 1003), martyrs
- Bruno of Querfurt (c. 974 – 14 February 1009), Bishop and Martyr; Second Apostle of the Prussians
- Romuald (c. 951 – 19 June 1027), founder of the order, canonized on 9 July 1595
- Domenico Loricato (c. 995 – c. 1060), monk and hermit
- Rodolfo Gabrielli (c. 1034 – 17 October 1064), Bishop of Gubbio
- Theobald of Provins (c. 1033 – 30 June 1066), noble and hermit, canonized in 1073
- Parisius (c. 1160 – c. 1267), spiritual director
- Ambrogio Traversari (c. 1386 – 20 October 1439), Prior General of the Camaldolese Order

Blesseds

- Forte Gabrielli (died 9 May 1040), professed religious, beatified on 17 March 1756
- Lucia da Settefonti (died 12th century), virgin and abbess, beatified in c. 1779
- Giovanna de Bagno di Romagna (died c. 1105), professed religious and virgin, beatified on 15 April 1823
- Bogumił z Dobrowa (c. 1135? – c. 1204?), Archbishop of Gniezno, beatified on 27 May 1925
- Domenico Vernagalli (c. 1180 – 20 April 1219), professed religious, beatified on 17 August 1854
- Bartolomeo Aiutamicristo of Pisa (died 28 January 1224), beatified on 10 September 1857
- Gherardesca of Pisa (c. 1200 – c. 1269/1270), professed religious and hermit, beatified on 29 May 1856
- Angelo of Acquapagana (c. 1261 – 19 August 1313), beatified on 24 July 1845
- Angelo of Gualdo Tadino (c. 1270 – 15 January 1325), hermit, beatified on 3 August 1825
- Tommaso da Costacciaro (died 25 March 1337), monk, beatified on 18 March 1778
- Alberto of Sassoferato (died 7 August 1350), monk, beatified on 30 September 1837
- Angelo of Massaccio (died c. 1458), martyr, beatified on 22 April 1842
- Michele Pini/Pina (fl. 1401 – 27 January 1466), beatified in c. 1807

Declared Blessed by popular acclaim

- Pietro Gabrielli (c. 970 – 26 July 1040), hermit
- Guido d'Arezzo (c. 991/992 – c.1045/1050), music theorist
- Guido della Gherardesca (c. 1060 – 20 May 1140), hermit
- Gherardo di Serra di Conti (Serradiconti) (c. 1280 – 16 November 1367), monk
- Daniele d'Ungrispach (c. 1344 – c. 1411), martyr
- Pietro Massaleno (c. 1375 – 20 December 1453), hermit
- Paolo (Tommaso) Giustiniani (c. 1476 – c. 1528), reformer

Servants of God

- Maciej (Alojzy) Poprawa (3 March 1893 – 14 August 1942), martyred by Nazis, declared as such in 2003
- Walenty (Cherubin) Kozik (1 February 1906 – 25 September 1942), martyred by Nazis, declared as such in 2003

== See also ==
- Christian monasticism
- Červený Kláštor (monastery)
