= Bieniszew =

Coordinates: 52.2838°N 18.1833°E

- Village
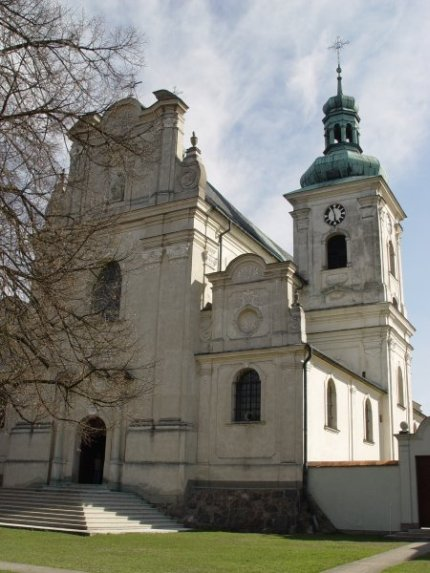
- Interactive map of Bieniszew
- Country: Poland
- Voivodeship: Greater Poland
- County: Konin County

Bieniszew is a village within Konin County, Wielkopolskie (Greater) Voivodeship, in western Poland.

Place is famous for its great Camaldolese Monastery – Eremus ss. Quinque Martyrum – Hermitage of Five Martyred Brothers. Bieniszew is considered as the place of martyrdom of five monks: John, Benedict, Mathew, Isaac, Kristin – traditionally known to be the first Polish Camaldolese monks.

Foundation of the monastery began in the early 17th century, when in 1621 fr. Silvanus Boselli E.C. sought sponsorship and guidance in Grand Crown Marshal Mikołaj Wolski, who was a founder of the first Camaldolese monastery in Poland, in Bielany near Cracow). But this attempt was unsuccessful and for the next forty years no progress was made. Then fr. Boselli together with fr. Hieronim Krasowski began another attempt to persuade this time a governor of Radziejów Albert Kadzidłowski to be a founder of a new monastery. At first he was unwilling but extraordinary circumstances and events persuade him to let go. He agreed to give the monks only a part of oak forest together with Owl Mountain and granted the right to fish in the Skąpe lake and cut trees in the forest. A royal act confirmed that grant on 1 August 1663. Soon monks started to build a wooden church, which survived nearly twenty years. First mass was celebrated on 17 October 1666. In 1741, fire destroyed almost the whole church with its great main altar, marvellous painting of Mary with Jesus and part of the library. 6 years later erection of the new brick church began. Because of the poor financial condition of the monastery it took nearly 34 years. It was consecrated in 1797 just a few years after Poland was divided by three invaders: Russia, Prussia and Austria – commonly known as Partitions of Poland. Initially Bieniszew was in the Prussian partition but after Napoleon Bonaparte's crusade through Europe it came under Russia. During this time the number of monks was decreasing, in 1810 there were only five fathers, which was insufficient to elect a new abbot. In 1819 the monastery was dissolved.

Monks returned to Bieniszew in 1937 and on 2 July that year, the monastery was reconsecrated. But soon the World War II erupted and monks were in danger again. Some of the fathers were sent to concentration camps mainly in Dachau and Ravensbruck. Only fr. Florian Niedźwiadek survived the war. Cloister and other buildings were occupied by Hitlerjugend organization, which destroyed almost everything: altars, paintings, stalls, liturgical books and vessels. Furthermore, they opened tombs and scattered monks bones within forest.

After the war, Camaldolese returned to Bieniszew and started to rebuild what was destroyed. The restoration work lasted nearly 30 years.

In 2003 monastery celebrated the 1000 anniversary of Five Brothers Martyrdom. The celebrations gathered thousands of pilgrims and for a couple of days turned this hermitage into a religious center.

In 2008 there were two fathers and 6 brothers in the monastery.
