= Romuald =

Founder of the Camaldolese order

== Introduction ==
Saint Romuald
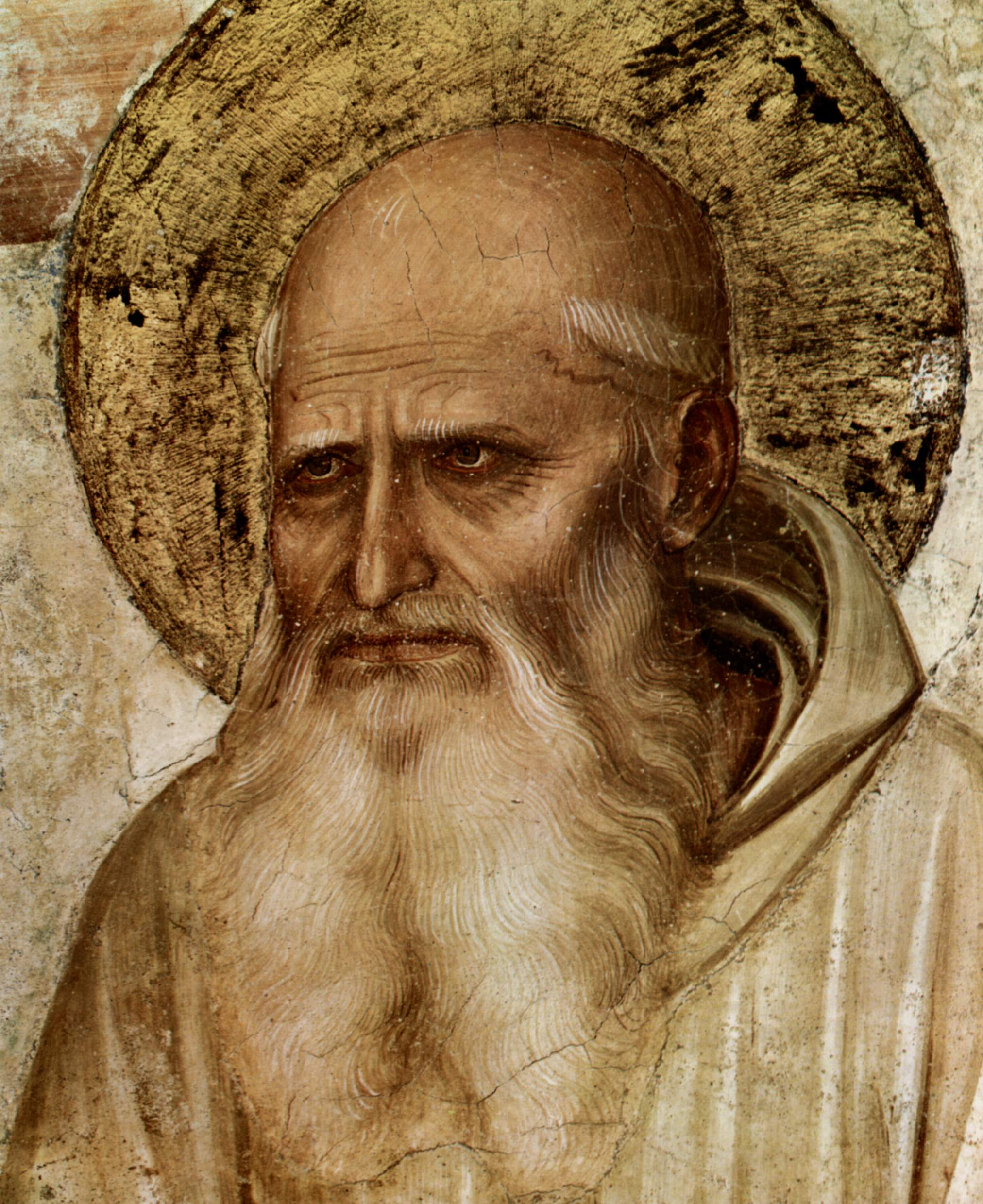
- Portrait by Fra Angelico

Abbot Confessor of the Faith
- Born: c. 951; Ravenna
- Died: 19 June 1027; Val di Castro
- Venerated in: Catholic Church; Eastern Orthodox Church
- Feast: Catholic Church: 19 June; General Roman Calendar of 1960: 7 February; Eastern Orthodox Church: 7 February

St. Romuald of Ravenna (c. 950 - 1027 AD) was a 10th and 11th century Italian nobleman, hermit, monk, and monastic reformer following the dissolution of the Carolingian Empire in 887 AD. St. Romuald would inspire later figures such as St. Peter Damian, who would later write Romuald's hagiography, (Vita Beati Romualdi) in 1042 AD as a model of monastic reform.

== Life ==
According to the vita by Peter Damian, written about 15 years after Romuald's death, Romuald was born in Ravenna, in northeastern Italy, to the aristocratic Onesti family. His father was Sergius degli Onesti, and his mother was Traversara Traversari. As a youth, according to early accounts, Romuald indulged in the pleasures and sins common to a 10th-century nobleman. At the age of 20, he served as second to his father, who killed a relative in a duel over property. Romuald was devastated and went to the Basilica of Sant'Apollinare in Classe to do 40 days of penance. After some indecision, Romuald became a monk there. San Apollinare had recently been reformed by St. Mayeul of Cluny Abbey, but still was not strict enough in its observance to satisfy Romuald. His injudicious correction of the less zealous aroused such enmity against him that he applied for, and was readily granted, permission to retire to Venice, where he placed himself under the direction of a hermit named Marinus and lived a life of extraordinary severity.

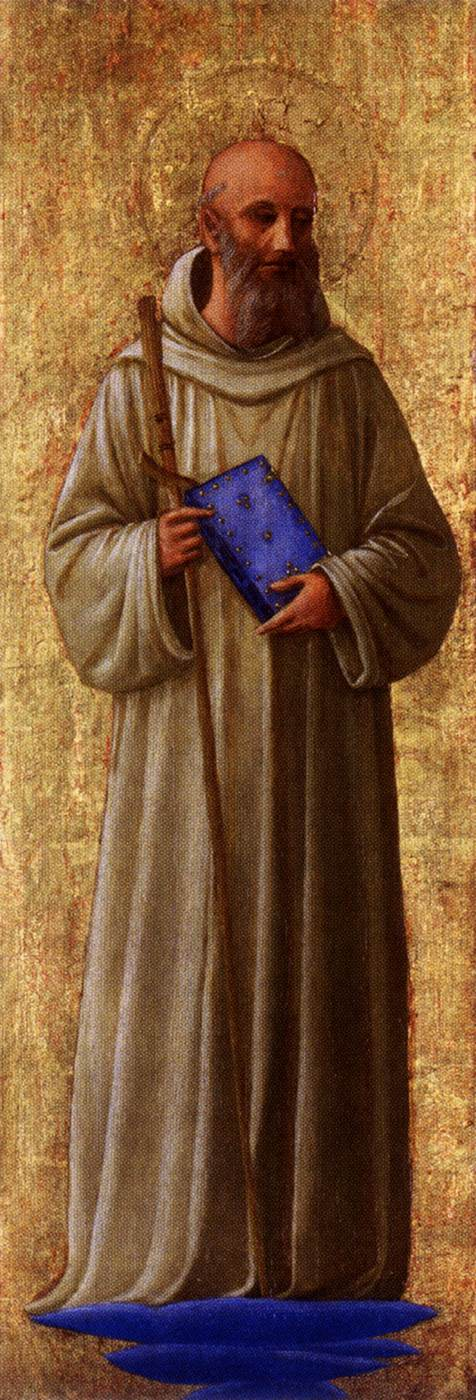
San Romualdo, from the San Marco altarpiece by Fra Angelico (Minneapolis Institute of Arts)

About 978, Pietro I Orseolo, Doge of Venice, who had obtained his office by acquiescence in the murder of his predecessor, began to suffer remorse for his crime. On the advice of Guarinus, Abbot of Saint-Michel-de-Cuxa, in Catalonia, and of Marinus and Romuald, he abandoned his office and relations, and fled to Cuxa, where he took the habit of St. Benedict, while Romuald and Marinus erected a hermitage close to the monastery. Romuald lived there for about ten years, taking advantage of the library of Cuxa to refine his ideas regarding monasticism.

He then spent the next 30 years travelling in Italy, founding and reforming monasteries and hermitages. His reputation being known to advisors of the Holy Roman Emperor Otto III, Romuald was persuaded by him to take the vacant office of abbot at Sant'Apollinare to help bring about a more dedicated way of life there. The monks, however, resisted his reforms, and after a year, Romuald resigned, hurling his abbot's staff at Otto's feet in total frustration. He then again withdrew to the eremitical life.

In 1012, he arrived at the Diocese of Arezzo. Here, according to the legend, a certain Maldolus, who had seen a vision of monks in white garments ascending into Heaven, granted him some land, which later became known as the Campus Maldoli, or Camaldoli. St. Romuald built on this land five cells for hermits, which, with the monastery at Fontebuono, built two years later, became the famous mother-house of the Camaldolese Order. Romuald's daunting charisma awed Rainier of Tuscany, who was neither able to face Romuald nor to send him away. Romuald founded several other monasteries, including the monastery of Val di Castro, where he died in 1027.

Romuald's feast day was not included in the Tridentine calendar. It was added in 1594 for celebration on 19 June, the date of his death, but in the following year it was transferred by Pope Clement VIII to 7 February, the anniversary of the transfer of his relics to Fabriano in 1481, and in 1969 it was moved back to the day of his death.

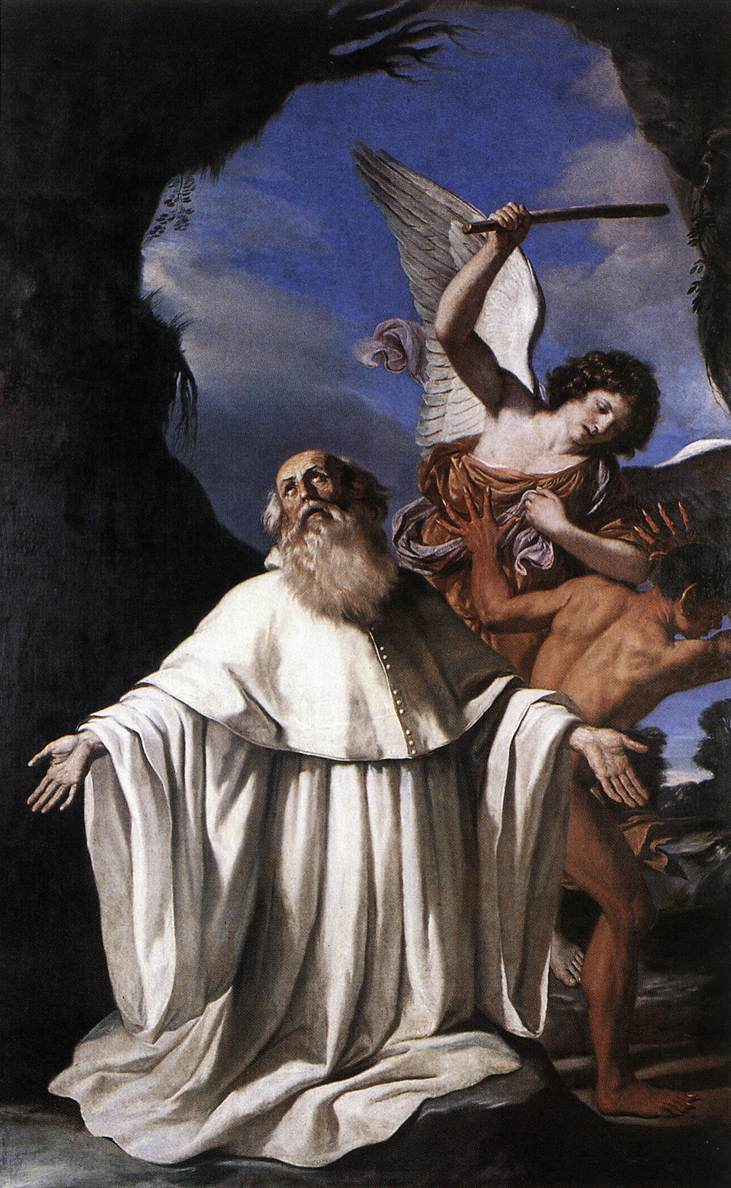
In San Romualdo, painted for the Church of San Romualdo, Ravenna, by Guercino, 1641, an angel uses the abbot's baton to chastise an errant figure (Pinacoteca Comunale, Ravenna).

== St. Romuald's Rule ==
In his youth, Romuald became acquainted with three major schools of Western monastic tradition. Sant'Apollinare in Classe was a traditional Benedictine monastery under the influence of the Cluniac Reforms. Marinus followed a much harsher, ascetic, and solitary lifestyle, which originated in Irish eremitic traditions. The abbot of Sant Miguel de Cuxa, Guarinus, had also begun reforms but primarily drew on a third Christian tradition, that of the Iberian Peninsula. Romuald integrated these traditions and established his own monastic order. The admonition in his rule, Empty yourself completely and sit waiting, places him in relation to the long Christian history of intellectual stillness and interior passivity in meditation, as reflected in the nearly contemporary Byzantine ascetic practice known as Hesychasm.

Sit in your cell as in paradise. Put the whole world behind you and forget it. Watch your thoughts like a good fisherman watching for fish. The path you must follow is in the Psalms — never leave it.

If you have just come to the monastery, and in spite of your good will you cannot accomplish what you want, take every opportunity you can to sing the Psalms in your heart and to understand them with your mind. And if your mind wanders as you read, do not give up; hurry back and apply your mind to the words once more.

Archbishop Cosmo Francesco Ruppi noted that, "Interiorization of the spiritual dimension, the primacy of solitude and contemplation, slow penetration of the Word of God and calm meditation on the Psalms are the pillars of Camaldolese spirituality, which St. Romuald gives as the essential core of his Rule."

Romuald's reforms provided a structural context to accommodate both the eremitic and cenobitic aspects of monastic life.

== See also ==
- Catholic Church in Italy
- List of Catholic saints
- Saint Romuald, patron saint archive
- List of Eastern Orthodox saints
