= Camaldoli =

Frazione in Poppi, Tuscany, Italy

Coordinates: 43°47′N 11°49′E

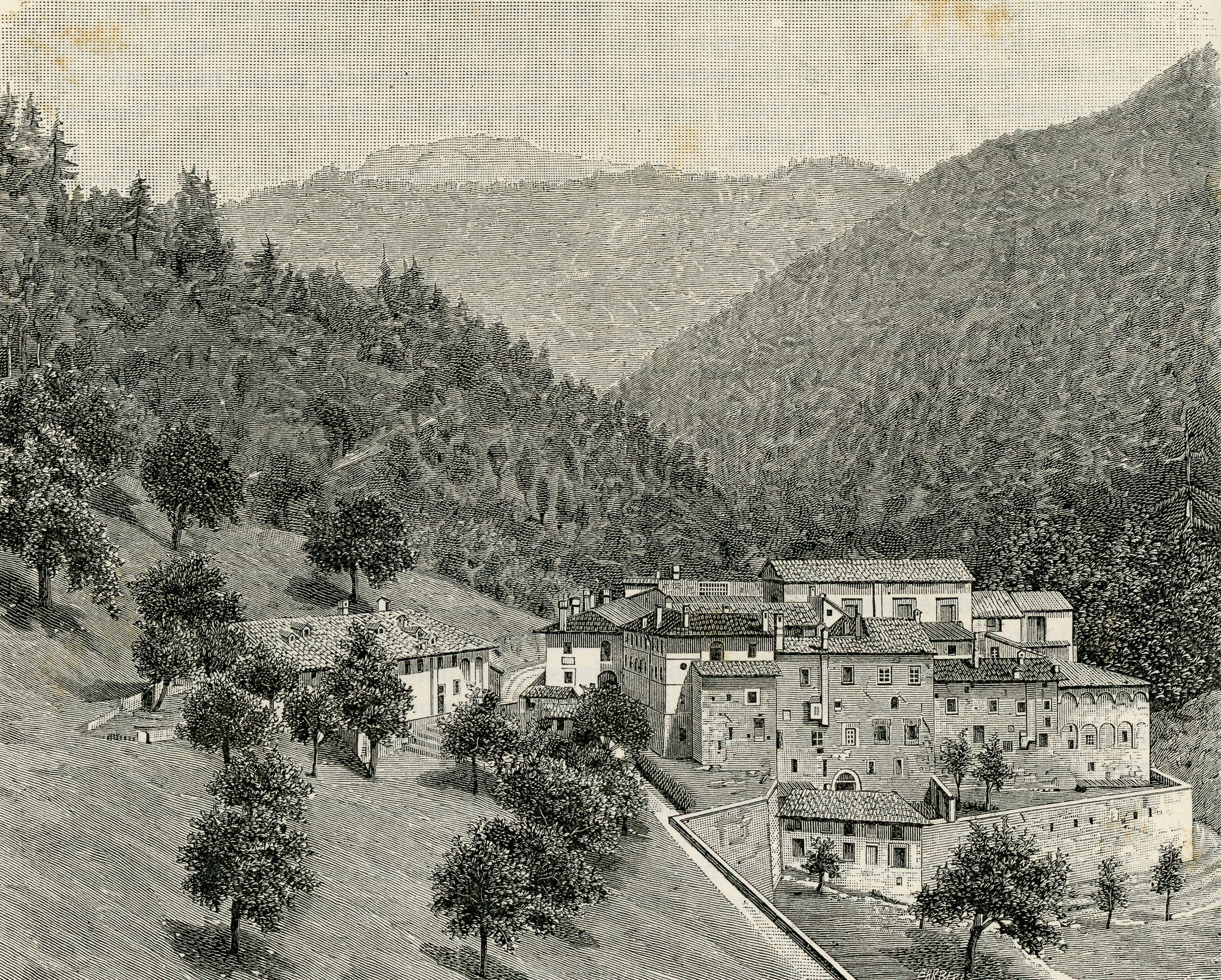
The Camaldoli monastery, 1898

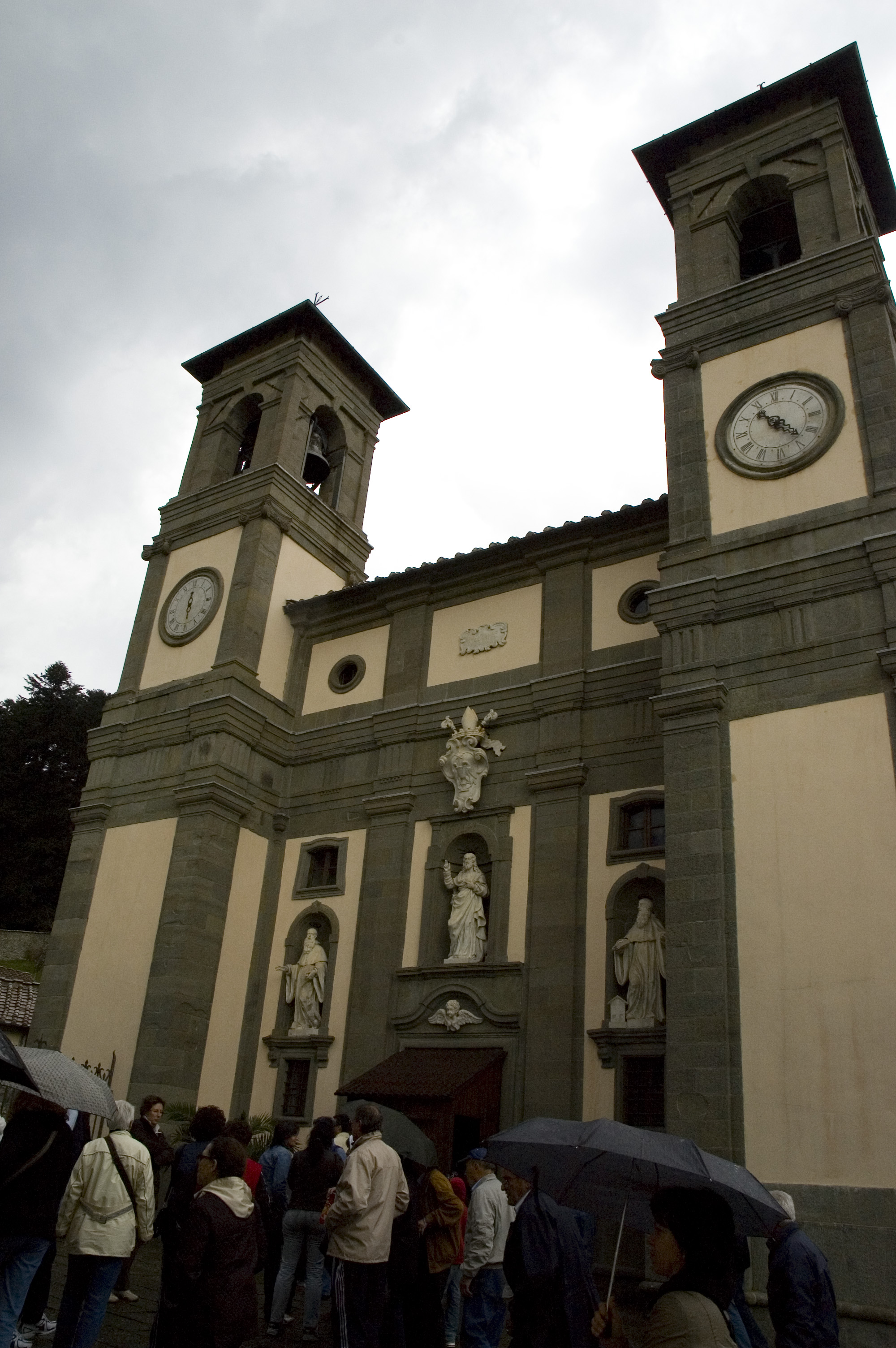
The church in Eremo di Camaldoli

Camaldoli (Italian pronunciation: [kaˈmaldoli]) is a frazione of the comune of Poppi, in Tuscany, Italy. It is mostly known as the ancestral seat of the Camaldolese monastic order, originated in the eponymous hermitage, which can still be visited. The name was derived from Tedald's diploma of 1027 where he writes that the church is located "in loco qui dicitur Campo Malduli" - 'in a place which is named Maldolo's field'.

== Overview ==
The Holy Hermitage and Monastery of Camaldoli is situated in an ancient forest in the Tuscan Apennines. It was founded around 1012 by Saint Romuald, a Benedictine monk, with the permission of Tedald, Bishop of Arezzo.

In the monastery of Camaldoli, there is a welcoming room, a great hall, and an old style pharmacy. The pharmacy was originally a laboratory where monks studied and worked with medicinal herbs. These medicines would be used in the old hospital that can still be visited today. The precious walnut décor dates back to 1543. The church was constructed in the Baroque style and contains works by Giorgio Vasari. It was established to deal with the ever-growing number of pilgrims, drawn by good reports of the monks, and for reflection in the middle of the forest.

A few kilometers further up the mountain is the "Sacred Hermitage", or Sacro Eremo which is the more ancient part of the foundation. It was personally established by St. Romuald and has served as the heart of both the community and the order, which bears the location's name.

An important document of Political Catholicism in Italy, the Codice di Camaldoli, was drafted in the monastery in July, 1943.
