= Battle of Craonne =

1814 battle during the War of the Sixth Coalition

- Part of the Campaign of France of the Sixth Coalition
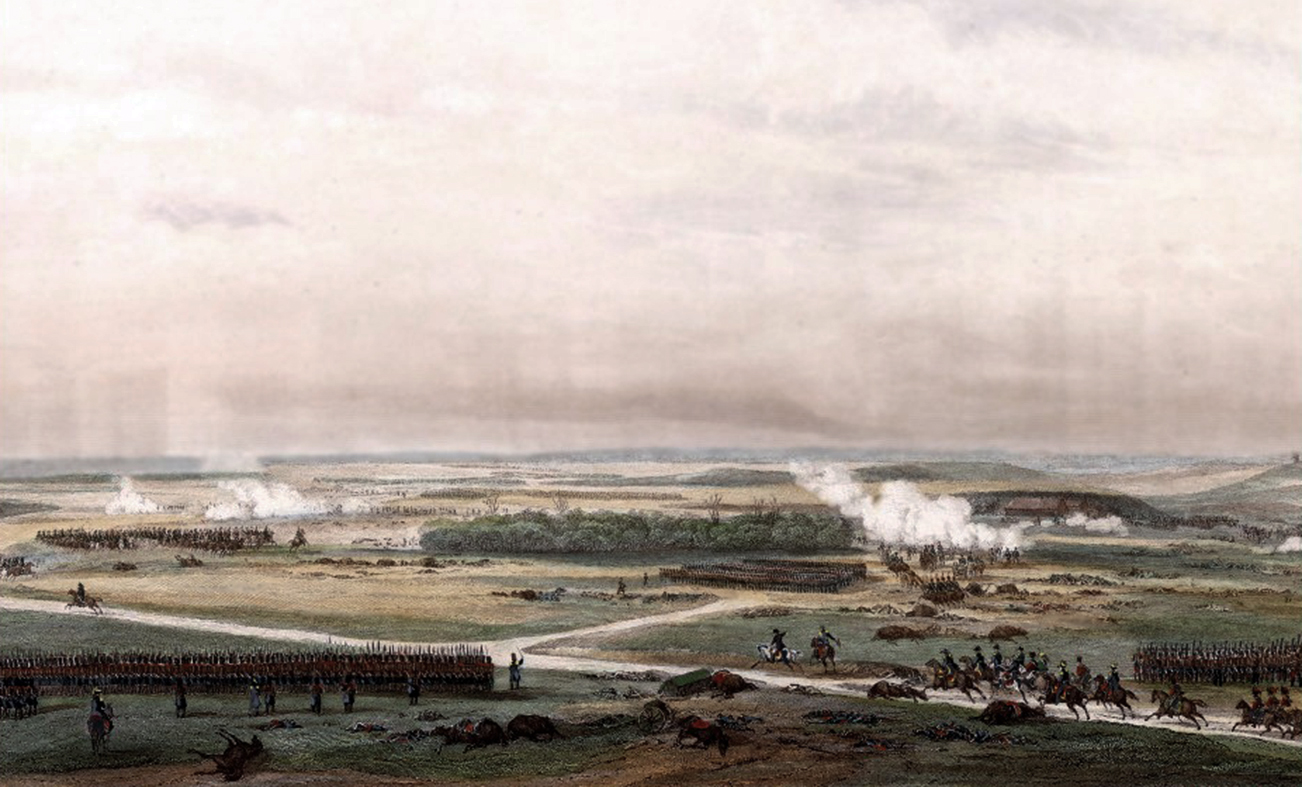
- The battle of Craonne, by Theodore Jung
Date	7 March 1814
Location	Craonne, France 49°26′27″N 3°47′15″E
Result	French victory (see the Result section)

Belligerents
(First French Empire) France	(Kingdom of Prussia) Prussia (Russian Empire) Russia

Commanders and leaders
(First French Empire) Napoleon Bonaparte (First French Empire) Michel Ney (First French Empire) Étienne de Nansouty	Overall: (Kingdom of Prussia) Gebhard Leberecht von Blücher (Russian Empire) Ferdinand Fyodorovich Wintzingerode Craonne: (Russian Empire) Mikhail Vorontsov

Strength
Overall: 48,000. Craonne: 30,000; 102 guns.	Overall: 110,000. Craonne: 22,300; 96 guns.

Casualties and losses
5,400–8,000	5,000
- Location within France

War of the Sixth Coalition:
Campaign in north-east France
current battle
Napoleon in command
Napoleon not in command

The Battle of Craonne (7 March 1814) was fought between an Imperial French army under Emperor Napoleon I opposing a combined army of Imperial Russians and Prussians led by Prussian Field Marshal Gebhard Leberecht von Blücher. The War of the Sixth Coalition engagement began when the bulk of Napoleon's army tried to drive Mikhail Semyonovich Vorontsov's 22,000 Russians off the Chemin des Dames plateau to the west of Craonne. After a bitter struggle, Napoleon's attacks compelled Vorontsov's force to withdraw, but French casualties exceeded Russian losses. While the battle raged, Blücher's attempt to turn Napoleon's east flank ended in failure due to poor planning.

In late February 1814, Blücher's army separated from the main Allied army of Austrian field marshal Karl Philipp, Prince of Schwarzenberg, moving northwest and making a dash at Paris. Napoleon left Marshal Jacques MacDonald with one army to observe Schwarzenberg and started after Blücher with another army. Blücher evaded Napoleon's attempt to trap him and retreated north toward Laon, picking up reinforcements as he went. Russian forces under Ferdinand von Wintzingerode and a Prussian corps led by Friedrich Wilhelm Freiherr von Bülow would soon give Blücher a huge numerical advantage over the French. Napoleon came into contact with Vorontsov's corps on the evening of 6 March, believing that he had Blücher on the run. The next contest would be the Battle of Laon on 9–10 March.

Craonne is located 25 kilometres (16 mi) southeast of Laon and about 90 kilometres (56 mi) northeast of Paris.

== Background ==
=== Operations ===
On 22 February 1814, Schwarzenberg with nearly 150,000 Allied troops faced Napoleon with half that number at Troyes. Because bad news arrived from the south and the Allied army was poorly supplied, but mainly because he believed that he was outnumbered, Schwarzenberg ordered a retreat that evening. Disappointed that no battle was going to be fought, Blücher proposed that his army separate from the main army and operate to the north. To this Schwarzenberg agreed and Blücher's 53,000 soldiers began moving northwest. When he realized that the Prussian field marshal's army was headed for Paris, Napoleon left 42,000 troops under Marshal Jacques MacDonald to contain Schwarzenberg and marched after Blücher with 35,000 men. An additional 10,000 soldiers under Marshals Auguste de Marmont and Édouard Mortier stood between the Prussian field marshal and Paris.

Marmont and Mortier blocked Blücher's advance on 28 February when they defeated Friedrich von Kleist's corps in the Battle of Gué-à-Tresmes. The following day, Blücher again failed to push the reinforced French out of his path, but time had run out. On 2 March the Prussian field marshal realized that Napoleon was following him and decided to retreat to the north bank of the Ourcq River. He knew that Wintzingerode's Russians and Bülow's Prussians were nearby and hoped to join them soon. The premature surrender of Soissons allowed Blücher to more easily cross to the north bank of the Aisne River on 3–4 March. By this time Napoleon knew that Wintzingerode had joined Blücher, giving him at least 70,000 men to oppose 48,000 French troops. However, the French emperor believed that Bülow was still well to the north near Avesnes-sur-Helpe.

=== Pre-battle maneuvers ===
In fact, Blücher may have had as many as 110,000 troops by this time. They were distributed as follows – Russians: Wintzingerode (30,000), Louis Alexandre Andrault de Langeron (26,000), Fabian Gottlieb von Osten-Sacken (13,700); Prussians: Bülow (16,900), Kleist (10,600), Ludwig Yorck von Wartenburg (13,500). For his part, Napoleon had 34,233 troops on 2 March while Marmont and Mortier had been reinforced to 17,000 men but lost possibly 3,000 casualties in the week before Craonne. Yet, Napoleon hoped to get to Laon before Blücher's army arrived there. On 5 March, Napoleon was at Fismes from where he hoped to move straight north to Laon. Since he lacked a pontoon bridge to cross the Aisne, the French emperor directed his forces to move northeast to Berry-au-Bac where there was a stone bridge. Berry-au-Bac was on the direct road from Reims to Laon. On this day, Napoleon ordered Jan Willem Janssens at Mézières to gather up the Ardennes garrisons and operate in Blücher's rear areas. Janssens promptly obeyed and the movements of his troops threw a scare into the Allies.

At 5:00 am on 5 March, Guard cavalry divisions under Pierre David de Colbert-Chabanais and Louis Marie Levesque de Laferrière surprised and captured Reims and its Allied garrison. Napoleon ordered Étienne Marie Antoine Champion de Nansouty to seize Berry-au-Bac with a cavalry force consisting of Rémi Joseph Isidore Exelmans' division and Louis Michel Pac's brigade. At the Battle of Berry-au-Bac, Nansouty's troopers overran some Russian cavalry and captured 200 men and two guns, but the main prize was their seizure of the bridge. Louis Friant's 1st Old Guard Division and Claude Marie Meunier's 1st Young Guard Division crossed and occupied positions as far north as Corbeny. From 3:00–6:00 pm on 5 March, Marmont and Mortier tried to capture Soissons from its Russian garrison, but were repulsed. The Russians sustained 1,056 casualties, while the French lost 800–900 men. Another source calculated French losses as 1,500 men.

Blücher realized that Napoleon was trying to reach Laon by the Reims road. He sent Bülow and his wagon trains back to Laon. The Prussian commander began to shift his other forces to the northeast. By 6 March Napoleon had 30,500 men near Berry-au-Bac. He planned to send an advanced guard north toward Festieux, but needed to make sure of Blücher's intentions. During the day of 6 March, Meunier's division encountered Russian forces near Vauclair Abbey (Vauclerc) while two battalions of the Old Guard were needed to flush out Craonne's Russian defenders. At first Blücher directed his army to concentrate near Craonne, but he decided that position was too cramped for his 90,000 men. He also heard that French cavalry were advancing north on the Reims road. Changing plans, Blücher planned to assemble 10,000 cavalry and 60 horse artillery guns under Wintzingerode and send it toward Festieux. Wintzingerode's force consisted of 5,500 of his own horsemen plus all of the reserve cavalry belonging to Langeron and Yorck. Blücher ordered Wintzingerode's infantry, commanded by Vorontsov, to remain behind and directly oppose Napoleon's army.

=== Allied corps commanders ===
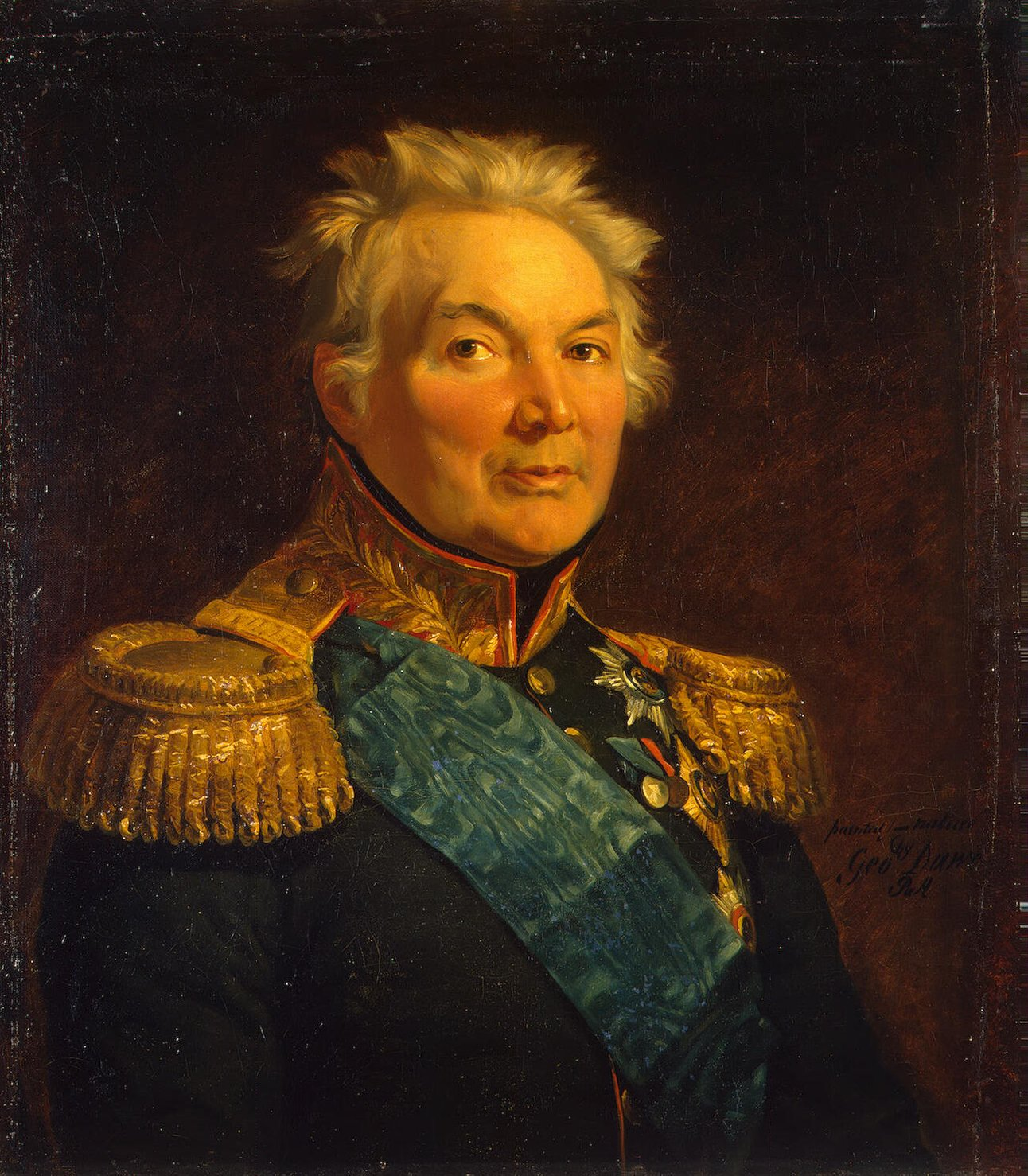
Russian General Fabian von Osten-Sacken

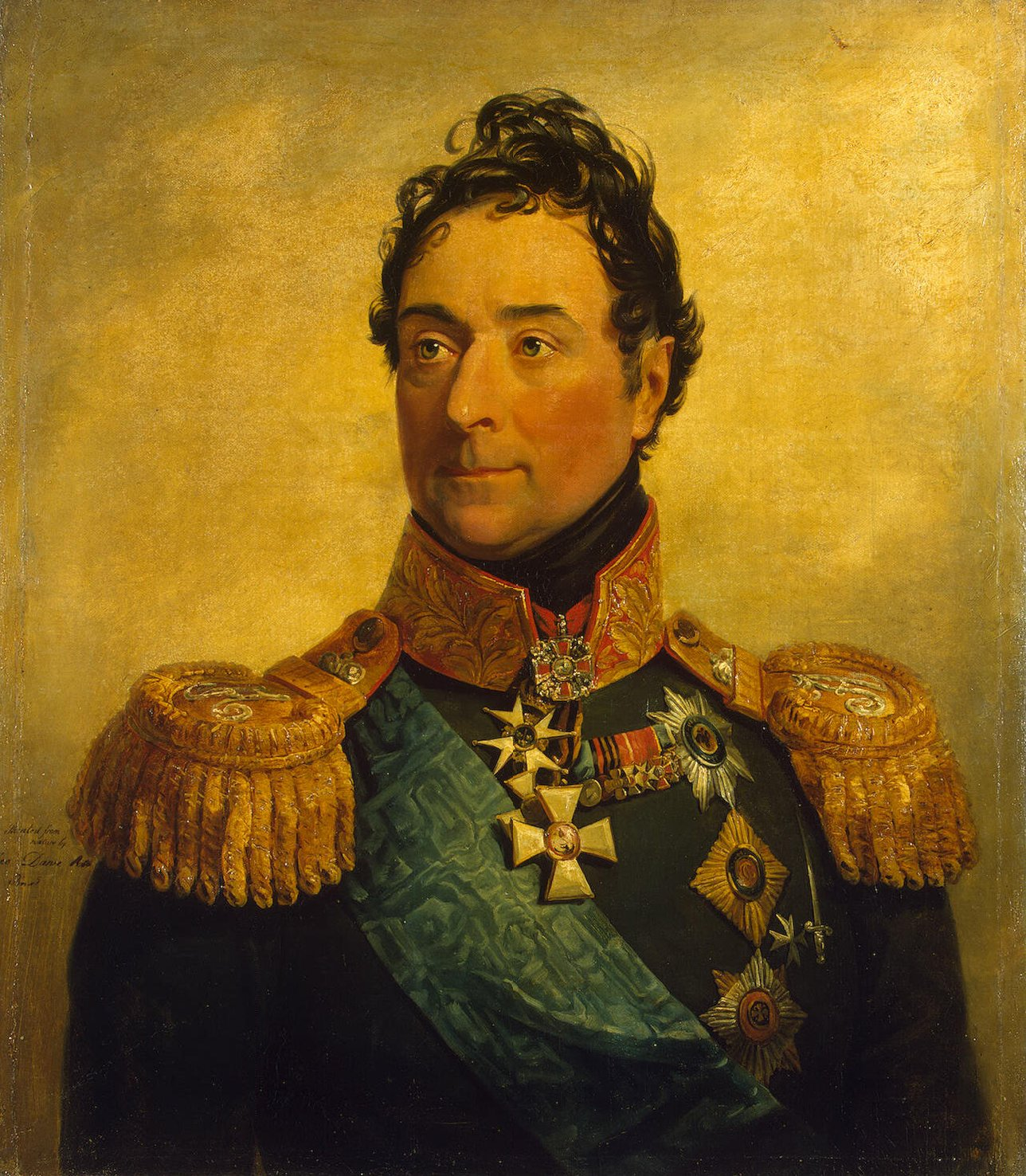
Russian General Louis Andrault de Langeron

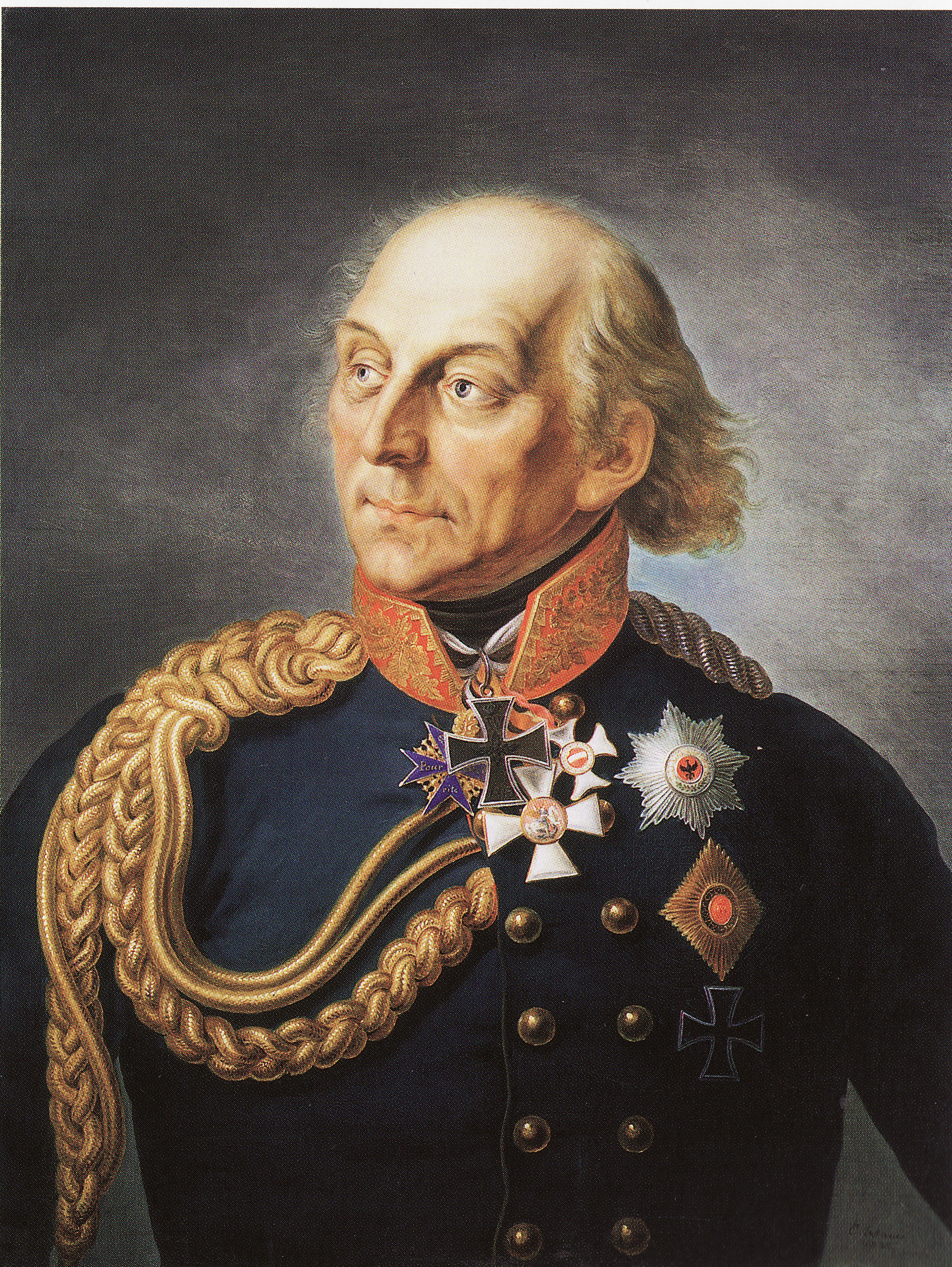
Prussian General Ludwig Yorck

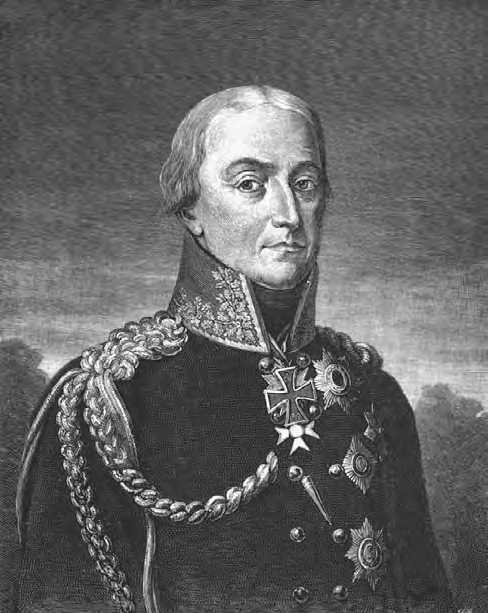
Prussian General Friedrich von Bülow

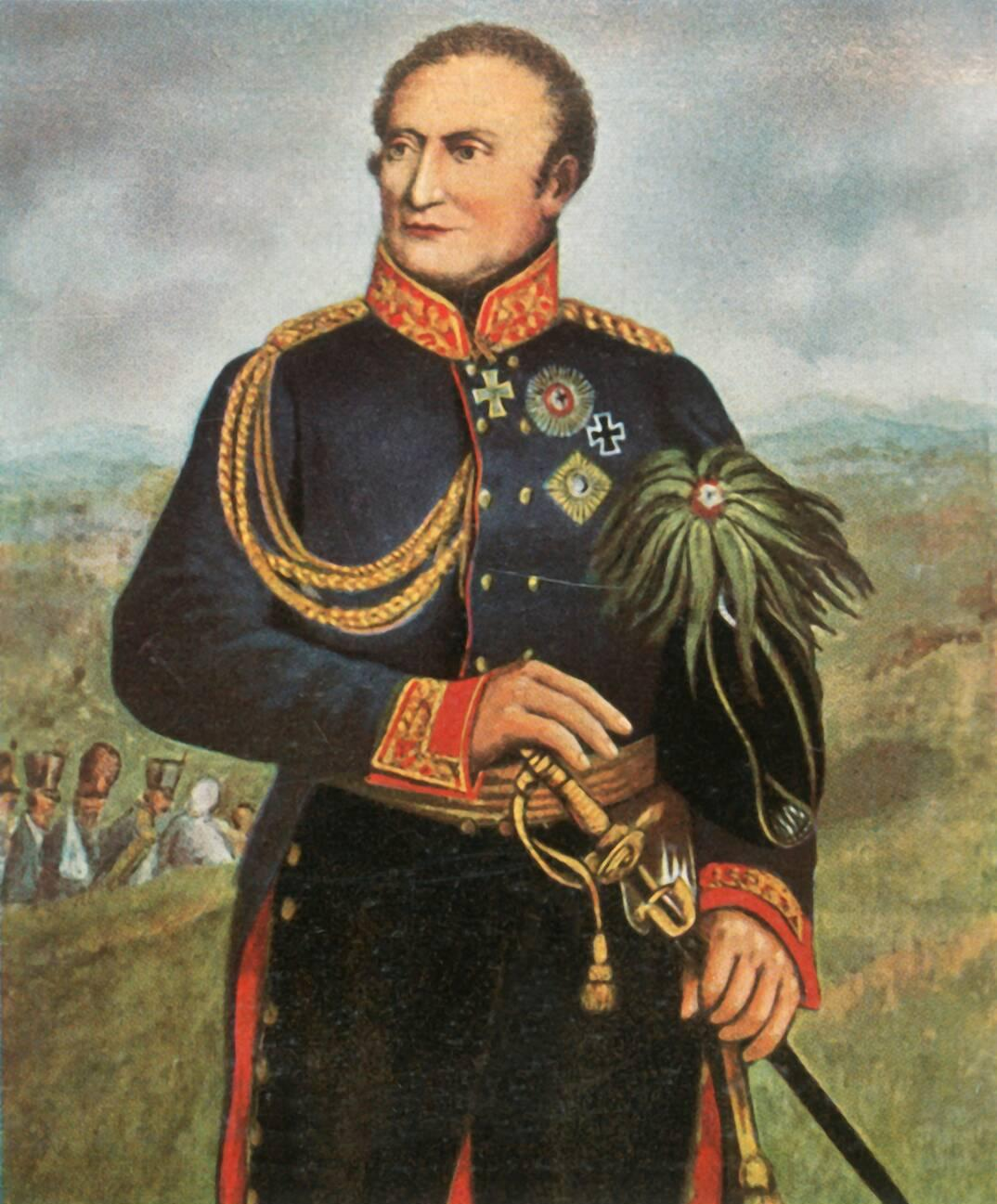
Prussian General Friedrich von Kleist

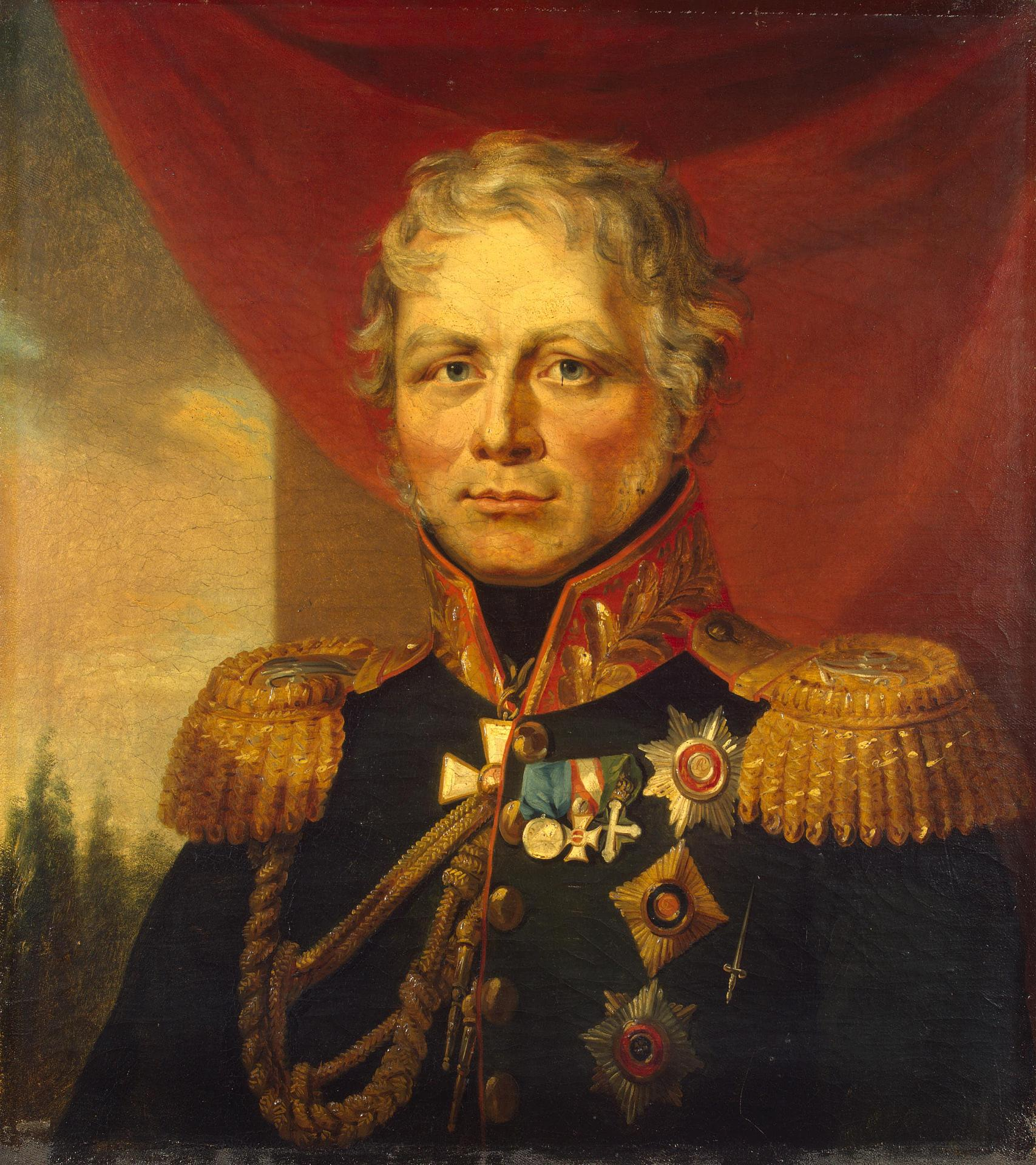
Russian General Ferdinand von Wintzingerode

=== French corps commanders ===
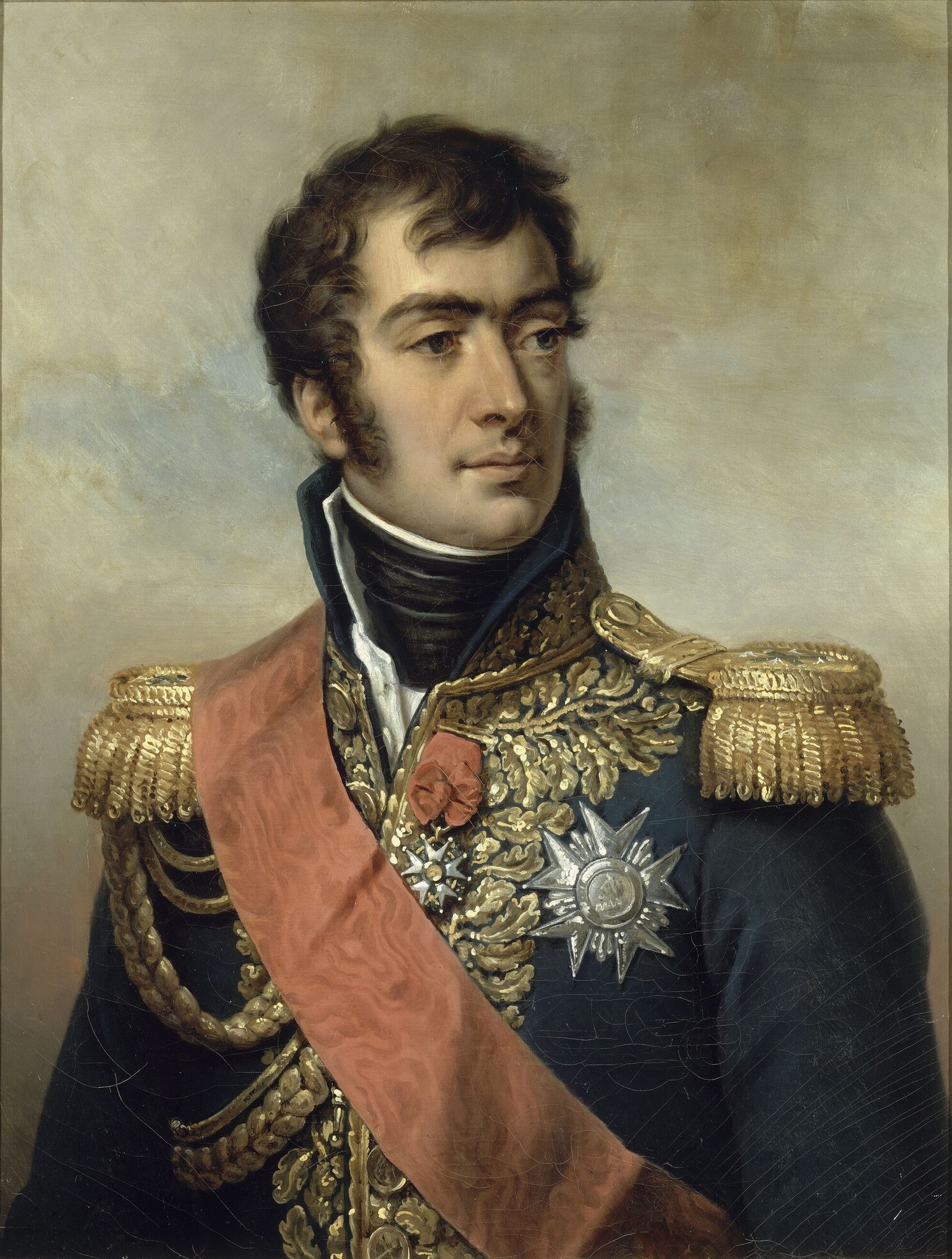
Marshal Auguste de Marmont

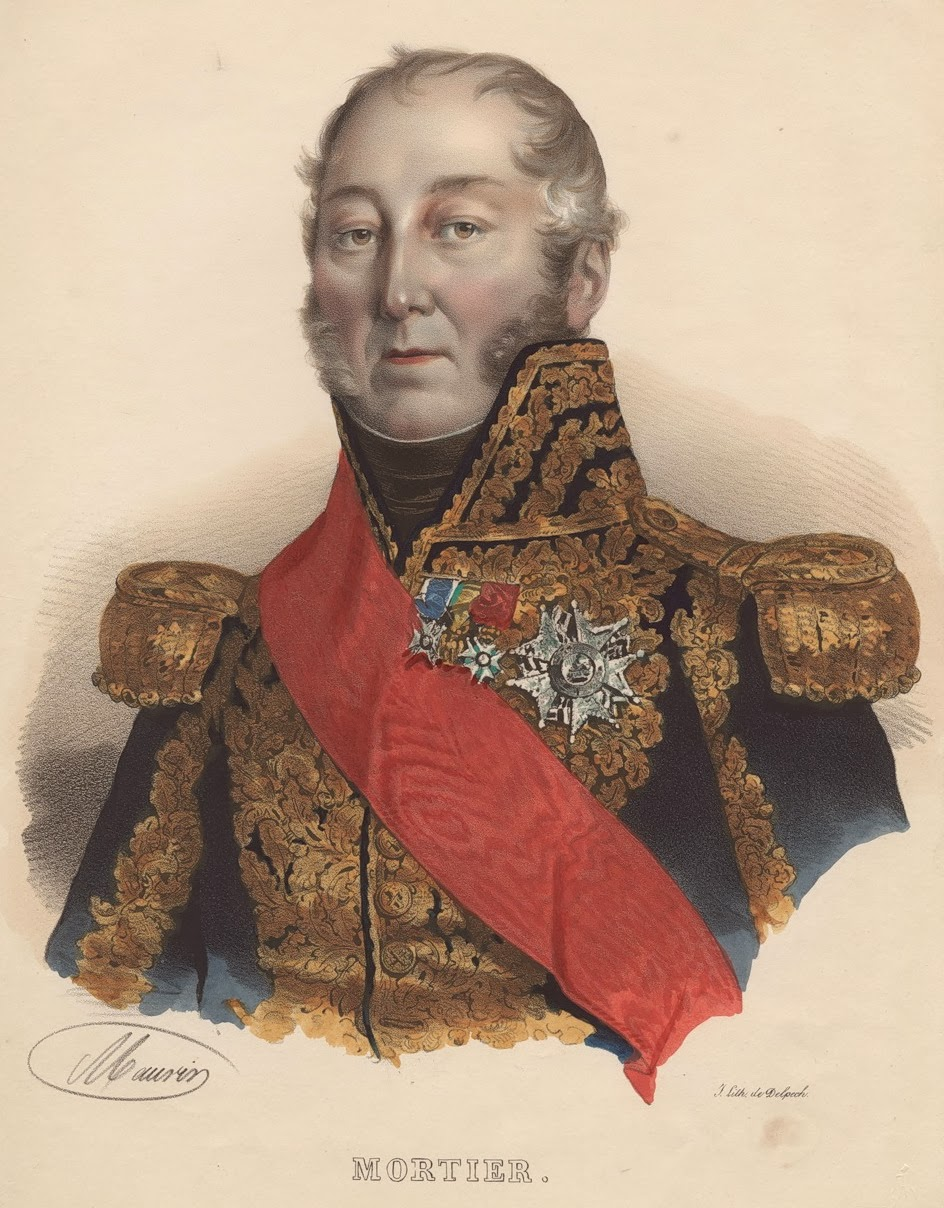
Marshal Édouard Mortier

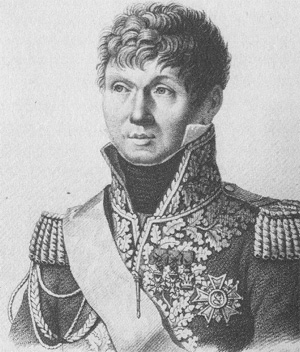
Marshal Claude Perrin Victor

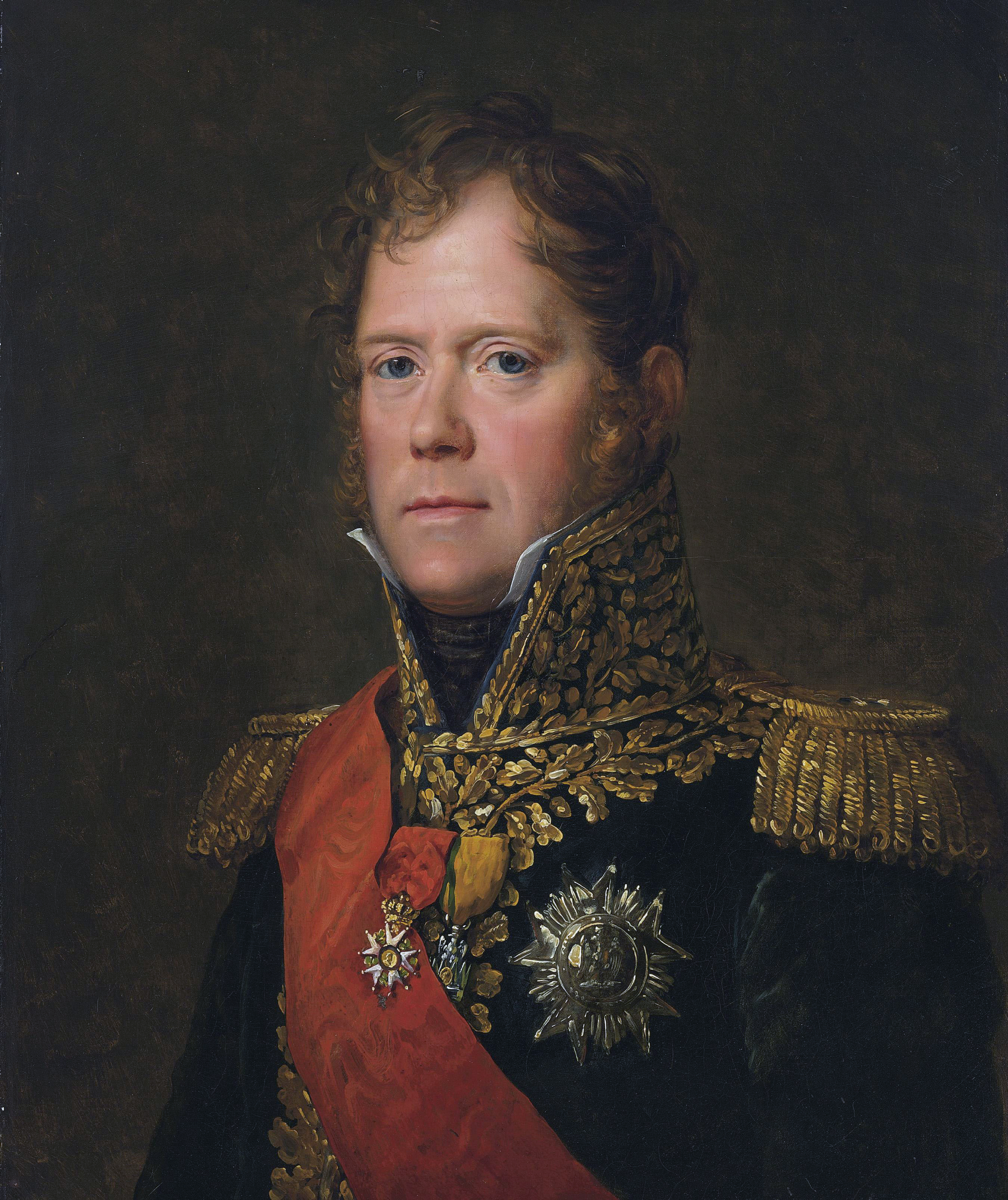
Marshal Michel Ney

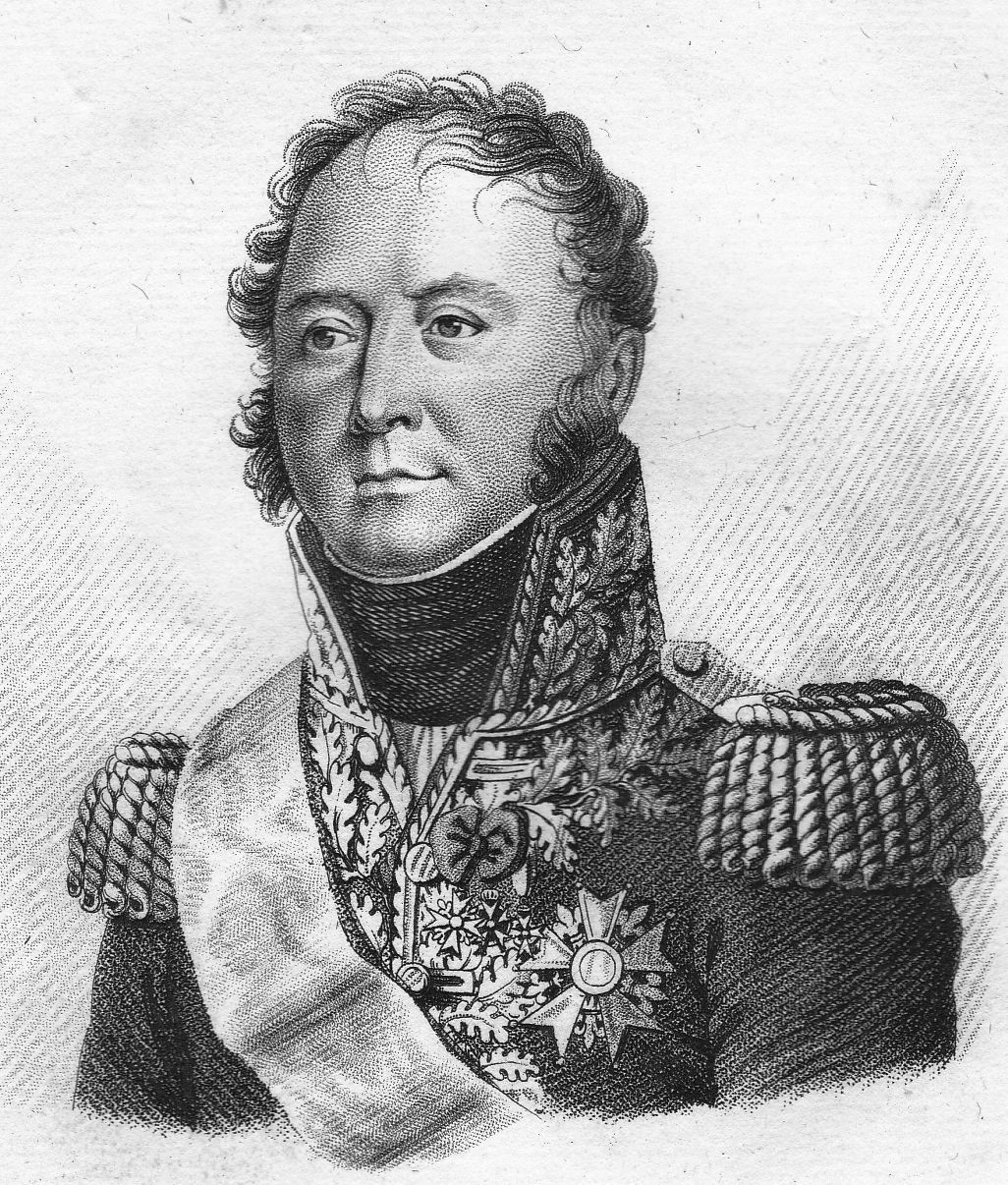
General of Division Augustin Belliard (replaced Grouchy)

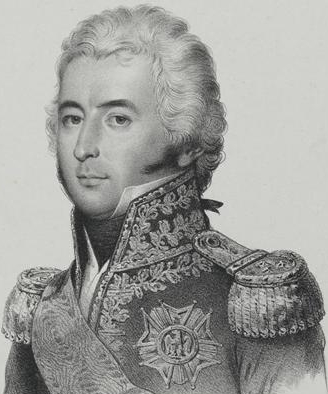
General of Division Étienne de Nansouty

== Forces ==
=== French order of battle ===
French Army at Craonne, 7 March 1814
Napoleon I
Corps	Division	Strength	Brigade	Units
Ney's Corps; Marshal Michel Ney	9th Infantry Division: General of Division; Pierre François Xavier Boyer	1,886	General of Brigade; Antoine Gruyer	2nd Light Infantry Regiment, 1st, 2nd, 6th Battalions
Ney's Corps; Marshal Michel Ney	9th Infantry Division: General of Division; Pierre François Xavier Boyer	1,886	General of Brigade; Antoine Gruyer	24th Line Infantry Regiment, 1st Battalion
Ney's Corps; Marshal Michel Ney	9th Infantry Division: General of Division; Pierre François Xavier Boyer	1,886	General of Brigade; Antoine Gruyer	36th Line Infantry Regiment, 6th Battalion
Ney's Corps; Marshal Michel Ney	9th Infantry Division: General of Division; Pierre François Xavier Boyer	1,886	General of Brigade; Antoine Gruyer	122nd Line Infantry Regiment, 1st, 4th Battalions
Ney's Corps; Marshal Michel Ney	9th Infantry Division: General of Division; Pierre François Xavier Boyer	1,886	General of Brigade; David Hendrik Chassé	Brigade detached to VII Corps
Ney's Corps; Marshal Michel Ney	9th Infantry Division: General of Division; Pierre François Xavier Boyer	1,886	Artillery; 8 6-pound cannons 4 howitzers	5th Foot Artillery Regiment, 22nd Company
Ney's Corps; Marshal Michel Ney	9th Infantry Division: General of Division; Pierre François Xavier Boyer	1,886	Artillery; 8 6-pound cannons 4 howitzers	8th Foot Artillery Regiment, 10th Company
Ney's Corps; Marshal Michel Ney	9th Infantry Division: General of Division; Pierre François Xavier Boyer	1,886	Artillery; 8 6-pound cannons 4 howitzers	4th and 9th (bis) Train Battalions, 2nd Companies
Ney's Corps; Marshal Michel Ney	1st Young Guard Division: General of Division; Claude Marie Meunier	865	Brigade: Unknown	1st Voltigeur Regiment
Ney's Corps; Marshal Michel Ney	1st Young Guard Division: General of Division; Claude Marie Meunier	865	Brigade: Unknown	2nd Voltigeur Regiment
Ney's Corps; Marshal Michel Ney	1st Young Guard Division: General of Division; Claude Marie Meunier	865	Brigade: Unknown	3rd Voltigeur Regiment
Ney's Corps; Marshal Michel Ney	1st Young Guard Division: General of Division; Claude Marie Meunier	865	Brigade: Unknown	4th Voltigeur Regiment
Ney's Corps; Marshal Michel Ney	2nd Young Guard Division: General of Division; Philibert Jean-Baptiste Curial	1,022	Brigade: Unknown	5th Voltigeur Regiment
Ney's Corps; Marshal Michel Ney	2nd Young Guard Division: General of Division; Philibert Jean-Baptiste Curial	1,022	Brigade: Unknown	6th Voltigeur Regiment
Ney's Corps; Marshal Michel Ney	2nd Young Guard Division: General of Division; Philibert Jean-Baptiste Curial	1,022	Brigade: Unknown	7th Voltigeur Regiment
Ney's Corps; Marshal Michel Ney	2nd Young Guard Division: General of Division; Philibert Jean-Baptiste Curial	1,022	Brigade: Unknown	8th Voltigeur Regiment
Victor's Corps; Marshal Claude Perrin Victor (WIA); General of Division; Henri François Charpentier	7th Young Guard Division: General of Division; Henri François Charpentier	3,600	Brigades: Unknown	3rd and 4th Tirailleur Regiments, 3rd Battalions
Victor's Corps; Marshal Claude Perrin Victor (WIA); General of Division; Henri François Charpentier	7th Young Guard Division: General of Division; Henri François Charpentier	3,600	Brigades: Unknown	10th, 11th and 12th Tirailleur Regiments, 3rd Battalions
Victor's Corps; Marshal Claude Perrin Victor (WIA); General of Division; Henri François Charpentier	7th Young Guard Division: General of Division; Henri François Charpentier	3,600	Brigades: Unknown	3rd and 4th Voltigeur Regiments, 3rd Battalions
Victor's Corps; Marshal Claude Perrin Victor (WIA); General of Division; Henri François Charpentier	7th Young Guard Division: General of Division; Henri François Charpentier	3,600	Brigades: Unknown	5th and 6th Voltigeur Regiments, 3rd Battalions
Victor's Corps; Marshal Claude Perrin Victor (WIA); General of Division; Henri François Charpentier	7th Young Guard Division: General of Division; Henri François Charpentier	3,600	Brigades: Unknown	7th, 8th and 11th Voltigeur Regiments, 3rd Battalions
Victor's Corps; Marshal Claude Perrin Victor (WIA); General of Division; Henri François Charpentier	2nd Provisional Young Guard Division: General of Division; Joseph Boyer de Rébeval (WIA)	3,800	General of Brigade; Auguste Julien Bigarré (WIA)	Infantry units unknown
Victor's Corps; Marshal Claude Perrin Victor (WIA); General of Division; Henri François Charpentier	2nd Provisional Young Guard Division: General of Division; Joseph Boyer de Rébeval (WIA)	3,800	General of Brigade; Jacques Le Capitaine (WIA)	Infantry units unknown
Victor's Corps; Marshal Claude Perrin Victor (WIA); General of Division; Henri François Charpentier	2nd Provisional Young Guard Division: General of Division; Joseph Boyer de Rébeval (WIA)	3,800	Artillery	1st Foot Artillery Regiment, 14th Company
Victor's Corps; Marshal Claude Perrin Victor (WIA); General of Division; Henri François Charpentier	2nd Provisional Young Guard Division: General of Division; Joseph Boyer de Rébeval (WIA)	3,800	Artillery	7th Foot Artillery Regiment, 8th Company
Victor's Corps; Marshal Claude Perrin Victor (WIA); General of Division; Henri François Charpentier	2nd Provisional Young Guard Division: General of Division; Joseph Boyer de Rébeval (WIA)	3,800	Artillery	14th Train Battalion, 5th Company
Grouchy's Corps; General of Division; Emmanuel de Grouchy (WIA); General of Division; Augustin-Daniel Belliard	3rd Guard Cavalry Division: General of Division; Louis Marie Levesque-Laferrière (WIA)	1,250	General of Brigade; Jean Dieudonné Lion	Guard Chasseurs a Cheval Regiment
Grouchy's Corps; General of Division; Emmanuel de Grouchy (WIA); General of Division; Augustin-Daniel Belliard	3rd Guard Cavalry Division: General of Division; Louis Marie Levesque-Laferrière (WIA)	1,250	General of Brigade; Jean Dieudonné Lion	Empress Dragoon Regiment
Grouchy's Corps; General of Division; Emmanuel de Grouchy (WIA); General of Division; Augustin-Daniel Belliard	3rd Guard Cavalry Division: General of Division; Louis Marie Levesque-Laferrière (WIA)	1,250	General of Brigade; Louis-Michel Letort de Lorville	Guard Horse Grenadier Regiment
Grouchy's Corps; General of Division; Emmanuel de Grouchy (WIA); General of Division; Augustin-Daniel Belliard	6th Heavy Cavalry Division: General of Division; Nicolas-François Roussel d'Hurbal	2,200	General of Brigade; Louis Ernest Joseph Sparre (WIA)	5th Dragoon Regiment
Grouchy's Corps; General of Division; Emmanuel de Grouchy (WIA); General of Division; Augustin-Daniel Belliard	6th Heavy Cavalry Division: General of Division; Nicolas-François Roussel d'Hurbal	2,200	General of Brigade; Louis Ernest Joseph Sparre (WIA)	12th Dragoon Regiment
Grouchy's Corps; General of Division; Emmanuel de Grouchy (WIA); General of Division; Augustin-Daniel Belliard	6th Heavy Cavalry Division: General of Division; Nicolas-François Roussel d'Hurbal	2,200	General of Brigade; André Rigaud	21st Dragoon Regiment
Grouchy's Corps; General of Division; Emmanuel de Grouchy (WIA); General of Division; Augustin-Daniel Belliard	6th Heavy Cavalry Division: General of Division; Nicolas-François Roussel d'Hurbal	2,200	General of Brigade; André Rigaud	26th Dragoon Regiment
Grouchy's Corps; General of Division; Emmanuel de Grouchy (WIA); General of Division; Augustin-Daniel Belliard	6th Heavy Cavalry Division: General of Division; Nicolas-François Roussel d'Hurbal	2,200	Artillery	2nd and 3rd Horse Artillery Regiments, 3rd Companies
Grouchy's Corps; General of Division; Emmanuel de Grouchy (WIA); General of Division; Augustin-Daniel Belliard	6th Heavy Cavalry Division: General of Division; Nicolas-François Roussel d'Hurbal	2,200	Artillery	1/2nd (bis), 2/5th and 5/6th Train Battalions
Nansouty's Corps; General of Division; Étienne Antoine Champion de Nansouty	Cavalry Division: General of Division; Rémi Joseph Isidore Exelmans	1,350	Brigades: Unknown	Cavalry units unknown
Nansouty's Corps; General of Division; Étienne Antoine Champion de Nansouty	Cavalry Brigade: General of Brigade; Louis Michel Pac	450	Brigades: None	3rd Hussar Regiment
Nansouty's Corps; General of Division; Étienne Antoine Champion de Nansouty	Cavalry Brigade: General of Brigade; Louis Michel Pac	450	Brigades: None	14th, 26th and 27th Chasseurs à Cheval Regiments
Reserve; Marshal Édouard Mortier	1st Old Guard Division: General of Division; Louis Friant	3,800	General of Brigade; Pierre Cambronne	1st Guard Foot Chasseur Regiment, 1st and 2nd Battalions
Reserve; Marshal Édouard Mortier	1st Old Guard Division: General of Division; Louis Friant	3,800	General of Brigade; Pierre Cambronne	2nd Guard Foot Chasseur Regiment, 1st and 2nd Battalions
Reserve; Marshal Édouard Mortier	1st Old Guard Division: General of Division; Louis Friant	3,800	General of Brigade; Jean-Martin Petit	1st Guard Foot Grenadier Regiment, 1st and 2nd Battalions
Reserve; Marshal Édouard Mortier	1st Old Guard Division: General of Division; Louis Friant	3,800	General of Brigade; Jean-Martin Petit	2nd Guard Foot Grenadier Regiment, 1st and 2nd Battalions
Reserve; Marshal Édouard Mortier	1st Old Guard Division: General of Division; Louis Friant	3,800	Attached units	Guard Sapper Battalion, 1st, 2nd and 3rd Companies
Reserve; Marshal Édouard Mortier	1st Old Guard Division: General of Division; Louis Friant	3,800	Attached units	Guard Marine Battalion, 3rd Company
Reserve; Marshal Édouard Mortier	1st Old Guard Division: General of Division; Louis Friant	3,800	Attached units	Guard Engineering Train
Reserve; Marshal Édouard Mortier	2nd Old Guard Division: General of Brigade; Charles-Joseph Christiani	3,300	General of Brigade; Christiani	Fusilier Chasseur Regiment
Reserve; Marshal Édouard Mortier	2nd Old Guard Division: General of Brigade; Charles-Joseph Christiani	3,300	General of Brigade; Christiani	Fusilier Grenadier Regiment
Reserve; Marshal Édouard Mortier	2nd Old Guard Division: General of Brigade; Charles-Joseph Christiani	3,300	General of Brigade; Christiani	Vélites of Turin
Reserve; Marshal Édouard Mortier	2nd Old Guard Division: General of Brigade; Charles-Joseph Christiani	3,300	General of Brigade; Jean Louis Gros	Flanquer Chasseur Regiment
Reserve; Marshal Édouard Mortier	2nd Old Guard Division: General of Brigade; Charles-Joseph Christiani	3,300	General of Brigade; Jean Louis Gros	Flanquer Grenadier Regiment
Reserve; Marshal Édouard Mortier	2nd Old Guard Division: General of Brigade; Charles-Joseph Christiani	3,300	General of Brigade; Jean Louis Gros	Vélites of Florence
Reserve; Marshal Édouard Mortier	2nd Old Guard Division: General of Brigade; Charles-Joseph Christiani	3,300	Artillery	3rd Foot Artillery Regiment, 25th Company
Reserve; Marshal Édouard Mortier	2nd Old Guard Division: General of Brigade; Charles-Joseph Christiani	3,300	Artillery	7th Horse Artillery Regiment, 2nd Company
Reserve; Marshal Édouard Mortier	2nd Old Guard Division: General of Brigade; Charles-Joseph Christiani	3,300	Artillery	2/7th (bis), 3/9th (bis) and 2/13th Train Battalions
Reserve; Marshal Édouard Mortier	3rd Provisional Young Guard Division: General of Brigade; Paul-Jean-Baptiste Poret de Morvan	4,800	Brigades: Unknown	Infantry units unknown
Reserve; Marshal Édouard Mortier	1st Guard Cavalry Division: General of Division; Pierre David de Colbert-Chabanais	1,100	Brigades: Unknown	2nd Guard Éclaireur Regiment
Reserve; Marshal Édouard Mortier	1st Guard Cavalry Division: General of Division; Pierre David de Colbert-Chabanais	1,100	Brigades: Unknown	2nd Guard Chevau-Léger Lancer Regiment
Reserve; Marshal Édouard Mortier	1st Guard Cavalry Division: General of Division; Pierre David de Colbert-Chabanais	1,100	Brigades: Unknown	Guard Chasseurs à Cheval Regiment
Reserve; Marshal Édouard Mortier	1st Guard Cavalry Division: General of Division; Pierre David de Colbert-Chabanais	1,100	Brigades: Unknown	Empress Dragoon Regiment
Reserve; Marshal Édouard Mortier	1st Guard Cavalry Division: General of Division; Pierre David de Colbert-Chabanais	1,100	Brigades: Unknown	Guard Horse Grenadier Regiment
Reserve; Marshal Édouard Mortier	1st Guard Cavalry Division: General of Division; Pierre David de Colbert-Chabanais	1,100	Brigades: Unknown	Horse Artillery
Army Total	23,573 infantry, 6,350 cavalry	29,923		

=== Russian order of battle ===
Russian Army at Craonne, 7 March 1814
Lieutenant General Mikhail Vorontsov
Formation	Division	Strength	Brigade	Units
First Line Right Wing	Independent Brigades	1,000	General; Alexander Benkendorf	Pavlograd Hussar Regiment, six squadrons
First Line Right Wing	Independent Brigades	1,000	General; Alexander Benkendorf	Bug Cossacks
First Line Right Wing	Independent Brigades	1,250	General; Afanasy Ivanovich Krasovsky (WIA)	14th Jäger Regiment, one battalion
First Line Right Wing	Independent Brigades	1,250	General; Afanasy Ivanovich Krasovsky (WIA)	15th Jäger Regiment, one battalion
First Line Right Wing	Independent Brigades	2,154	Generalmajor; Vasily Ivanovich Harpe (Garpe)	Navaguinsk Infantry Regiment, two battalions
First Line Right Wing	Independent Brigades	2,154	Generalmajor; Vasily Ivanovich Harpe (Garpe)	Converged Grenadier Battalion, 9th Division
First Line Right Wing	Independent Brigades	2,154	Generalmajor; Vasily Ivanovich Harpe (Garpe)	Converged Grenadier Battalion, 15th Division
First Line Right Wing	Independent Brigades	2,154	Generalmajor; Vasily Ivanovich Harpe (Garpe)	Converged Grenadier Battalion, 18th Division
First Line Right Wing	Independent Brigades	36 guns	Colonel Vinspar	Position Battery Nr. 31 (12 12-pound guns)
First Line Right Wing	Independent Brigades	36 guns	Colonel Vinspar	Horse Battery Nr. 7 (12 6-pound guns)
First Line Right Wing	Independent Brigades	36 guns	Colonel Vinspar	Horse Battery Nr. 21 (12 6-pound guns)
First Line Left Wing	24th Division: General; Nikolay Vasilyevich Vuich (Vuitsch)	4,300	General Swarikin	Chirvan Infantry Regiment, 1st and 3rd Battalions
First Line Left Wing	24th Division: General; Nikolay Vasilyevich Vuich (Vuitsch)	4,300	General Swarikin	Bourtirki Infantry Regiment, 1st and 3rd Battalions
First Line Left Wing	24th Division: General; Nikolay Vasilyevich Vuich (Vuitsch)	4,300	General Swarikin	19th Jäger Regiment, 1st and 3rd Battalions
First Line Left Wing	24th Division: General; Nikolay Vasilyevich Vuich (Vuitsch)	4,300	General Mikhail Ponset (from 14th Division)	Tula Infantry Regiment, 1st and 3rd Battalions
First Line Left Wing	24th Division: General; Nikolay Vasilyevich Vuich (Vuitsch)	4,300	General Mikhail Ponset (from 14th Division)	Navajinsk Infantry Regiment, 1st and 3rd Battalions
Second Line; General Vasily Laptiev (WIA)	21st Division: Laptiev	3,500; 36 guns	Colonel Rosen	Lithuania Infantry Regiment, one battalion
Second Line; General Vasily Laptiev (WIA)	21st Division: Laptiev	3,500; 36 guns	Colonel Rosen	Podolsk Infantry Regiment, one battalion
Second Line; General Vasily Laptiev (WIA)	21st Division: Laptiev	3,500; 36 guns	Colonel Rosen	Petrovsk Infantry Regiment, one battalion
Second Line; General Vasily Laptiev (WIA)	21st Division: Laptiev	3,500; 36 guns	Generalmajor; Alexander Karlovich Ridinger	Neva Infantry Regiment, one battalion
Second Line; General Vasily Laptiev (WIA)	21st Division: Laptiev	3,500; 36 guns	Generalmajor; Alexander Karlovich Ridinger	2nd Jäger Regiment, one battalion
Second Line; General Vasily Laptiev (WIA)	21st Division: Laptiev	3,500; 36 guns	Generalmajor; Alexander Karlovich Ridinger	44th Jäger Regiment, one battalion
Second Line; General Vasily Laptiev (WIA)	21st Division: Laptiev	3,500; 36 guns	Artillery	Position Battery Nr. 28 (12 12-pound guns)
Second Line; General Vasily Laptiev (WIA)	21st Division: Laptiev	3,500; 36 guns	Artillery	Light Battery Nr. 42 (12 6-pound guns)
Second Line; General Vasily Laptiev (WIA)	21st Division: Laptiev	3,500; 36 guns	Artillery	Light Battery Nr. 46 (12 6-pound guns)
Third Line; General-Leutnant; Pavel Aleksandrovich Stroganov	12th Division: Generalmajor; Nikolay Nikolaevich Hovansky (Chovansky) (WIA)	1,800	Brigades: Unknown	Smolensk Infantry Regiment, one battalion
Third Line; General-Leutnant; Pavel Aleksandrovich Stroganov	12th Division: Generalmajor; Nikolay Nikolaevich Hovansky (Chovansky) (WIA)	1,800	Brigades: Unknown	Narva Infantry Regiment, one battalion
Third Line; General-Leutnant; Pavel Aleksandrovich Stroganov	12th Division: Generalmajor; Nikolay Nikolaevich Hovansky (Chovansky) (WIA)	1,800	Brigades: Unknown	New Ingermanland Infantry Regiment, one battalion
Third Line; General-Leutnant; Pavel Aleksandrovich Stroganov	12th Division: Generalmajor; Nikolay Nikolaevich Hovansky (Chovansky) (WIA)	1,800	Brigades: Unknown	Alexopol Infantry Regiment, one battalion
Third Line; General-Leutnant; Pavel Aleksandrovich Stroganov	12th Division: Generalmajor; Nikolay Nikolaevich Hovansky (Chovansky) (WIA)	1,800	Brigades: Unknown	6th Jäger Regiment
Third Line; General-Leutnant; Pavel Aleksandrovich Stroganov	12th Division: Generalmajor; Nikolay Nikolaevich Hovansky (Chovansky) (WIA)	1,800	Brigades: Unknown	41st Jäger Regiment
Third Line; General-Leutnant; Pavel Aleksandrovich Stroganov	13th Division: General; Sergey Fyodorovich Zheltukhin (Selutschin)	3,300	Brigades: Unknown	Saratov Infantry Regiment, 1st and 3rd Battalions
Third Line; General-Leutnant; Pavel Aleksandrovich Stroganov	13th Division: General; Sergey Fyodorovich Zheltukhin (Selutschin)	3,300	Brigades: Unknown	Penza Infantry Regiment, 1st and 3rd Battalions
Third Line; General-Leutnant; Pavel Aleksandrovich Stroganov	Artillery	36 guns	Brigades: Unknown	Position Battery Nr. 53 (12 12-pound guns)
Third Line; General-Leutnant; Pavel Aleksandrovich Stroganov	Artillery	36 guns	Brigades: Unknown	Horse Battery Nr. 11 (12 6-pound guns)
Third Line; General-Leutnant; Pavel Aleksandrovich Stroganov	Artillery	36 guns	Brigades: Unknown	Light Battery Nr. 56 (12 6-pound guns)
Cavalry Corps; General-Leutnant; Ilarion Vasilievich Vasilshikov	2nd Hussar Division: Generalmajor; Sergey Nicolaevich Lanskoy †	1,500	Generalmajor; Ivan Mikhailovich Vadbolsky (Waddolski)	Akhtyrsk Hussar Regiment, six squadrons
Cavalry Corps; General-Leutnant; Ilarion Vasilievich Vasilshikov	2nd Hussar Division: Generalmajor; Sergey Nicolaevich Lanskoy †	1,500	Generalmajor; Ivan Mikhailovich Vadbolsky (Waddolski)	Mariopol Hussar Regiment, five squadrons
Cavalry Corps; General-Leutnant; Ilarion Vasilievich Vasilshikov	2nd Hussar Division: Generalmajor; Sergey Nicolaevich Lanskoy †	1,500	Colonel; Dmitri Vasilyevich Vasilshikov	White Russia Hussar Regiment, four squadrons
Cavalry Corps; General-Leutnant; Ilarion Vasilievich Vasilshikov	2nd Hussar Division: Generalmajor; Sergey Nicolaevich Lanskoy †	1,500	Colonel; Dmitri Vasilyevich Vasilshikov	Alexandria Hussar Regiment, five squadrons
Cavalry Corps; General-Leutnant; Ilarion Vasilievich Vasilshikov	3rd Dragoon Division: Generalmajor; Pantschichscheff	1,200	Generalmajor; Sergey Nikolaevich Ushakov II †	Smolensk Dragoon Regiment
Cavalry Corps; General-Leutnant; Ilarion Vasilievich Vasilshikov	3rd Dragoon Division: Generalmajor; Pantschichscheff	1,200	Generalmajor; Sergey Nikolaevich Ushakov II †	Courland Dragoon Regiment
Cavalry Corps; General-Leutnant; Ilarion Vasilievich Vasilshikov	3rd Dragoon Division: Generalmajor; Pantschichscheff	1,200	Generalmajor; Andrey Semyonovich Umanets (Umanez)	Tver Dragoon Regiment
Cavalry Corps; General-Leutnant; Ilarion Vasilievich Vasilshikov	3rd Dragoon Division: Generalmajor; Pantschichscheff	1,200	Generalmajor; Andrey Semyonovich Umanets (Umanez)	Kinburn Dragoon Regiment
Cavalry Corps; General-Leutnant; Ilarion Vasilievich Vasilshikov	3rd Dragoon Division: Generalmajor; Pantschichscheff	1,200	Artillery	Horse Artillery Battery Nr. 13 (12 6-pound guns)
Cavalry Corps; General-Leutnant; Ilarion Vasilievich Vasilshikov	Cossacks	1,200	Generalmajor; Akim Akimovich Karpov II	Karpov II Don Cossack Regiment
Cavalry Corps; General-Leutnant; Ilarion Vasilievich Vasilshikov	Cossacks	1,200	Generalmajor; Akim Akimovich Karpov II	Three unknown Cossack Regiments
Cavalry Corps; General-Leutnant; Ilarion Vasilievich Vasilshikov	Artillery	30 guns	Brigades: None	Horse Artillery Battery Nr. 1 (10 6-pound guns)
Cavalry Corps; General-Leutnant; Ilarion Vasilievich Vasilshikov	Artillery	30 guns	Brigades: None	Horse Artillery Battery Nr. 4 (8 6-pound guns)
Cavalry Corps; General-Leutnant; Ilarion Vasilievich Vasilshikov	Artillery	30 guns	Brigades: None	Horse Artillery Battery Nr. 11 (12 6-pound guns)

== Battle ==
=== 6 March ===
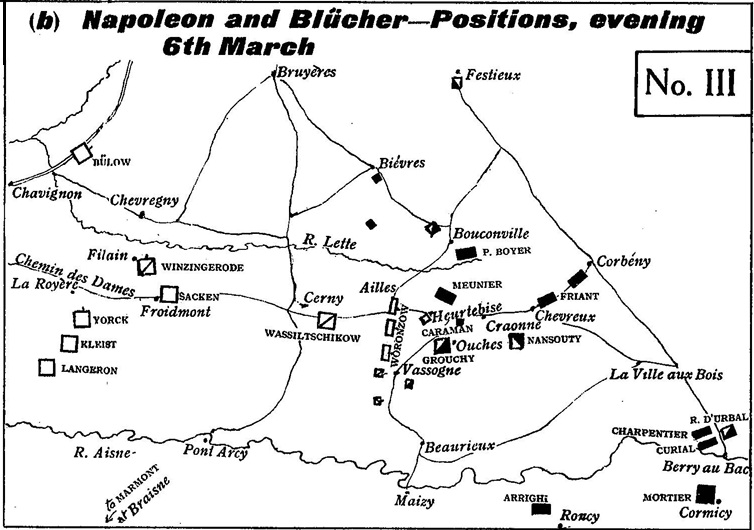
Evening 6 March 1814: This is before the Battle of Craonne.

By 5:00 pm on 6 March, Meunier captured Vauclair Abbey from the Russians. Meunier and the Old Guard battalions captured Heurtebise Farm several times, but its Russian defenders threw them out each time and remained in possession of the place. The Russian forces involved were the 13th and 14th Jäger Regiments. That evening, Meunier withdrew a little to the north while the Old Guards occupied part of the Chemin des Dames ridge that they seized. Pierre François Xavier Boyer's division was at Bouconville in support of Meunier, one Old Guard brigade was at Craonne and the other was at Corbeny, Exelmans' horsemen were at Craonnelle and Joseph Boyer de Rébeval's division was at La Ville-aux-Bois-lès-Pontavert. The divisions of Colbert, Laferrière, Philibert Jean-Baptiste Curial, Henri François Marie Charpentier and Nicolas-François Roussel d'Hurbal were at Berry-au-Bac. Still south of the Aisne were Mortier at Cormicy, Jean-Toussaint Arrighi de Casanova at Roucy and Marmont more distant at Braine. With him, Mortier had the infantry divisions of Charles-Joseph Christiani and Paul-Jean-Baptiste Poret de Morvan and the cavalry division of Jean-Marie Defrance.

Blücher planned to have Vorontsov defend against a French attack on the Chemin des Dames ridge, while Sacken remained in support farther west at Braye-en-Laonnois. While Napoleon was facing Vorontsov, Wintzingerode's cavalry, followed by Kleist, York and Langeron, would move east on the north side of the Ailette River, then strike Napoleon's right flank and rear. Wintzingerode's cavalry was supposed to gather at Filain before setting out on its march and was expected to arrive at Festieux at dawn. One difficulty was that Wintzingerode's horsemen would first have to move west along the Chemin des Dames ridge to reach Filain. When Wintzingerode arrived at Filain during the night, he found that the cavalrymen of Yorck and Langeron were already in camp with their horses unsaddled. In the circumstances, Wintzingerode decided to wait until daybreak to start on his march, but he neglected to order a reconnaissance of the roads.

=== 7 March: Plans ===
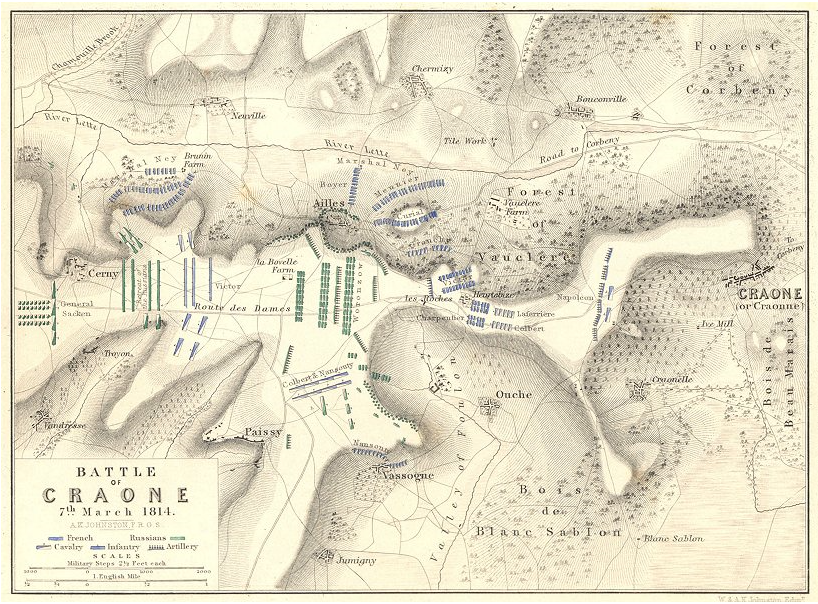
Battle of Craonne

The Chemin des Dames (Ladies' Road) starts on the Soissons-Laon road and runs east along a continuous ridge to Craonne and then loses elevation before rising again a little at Corbeny. The ridge has an average height of 400 feet (122 m) above the Aisne valley on the south. North of the Ailette there is more ground of a similar elevation. The slope was wooded and steeper on the north side where the marshy Ailette ran west before joining the Oise River. The ridge varies from 200 yards (180 m) to 2 miles (3.2 km) in width. It is narrow in the places where ravines encroach from north and south. The Russian position was naturally strong because the ridge in front was narrow and easily targeted with artillery fire. North of the narrows were the Marion Woods while the Quatre Heures Woods were to the south. The ridge was steep on the right flank but even more so on the left. The disadvantage on the left flank was that the slope was so steep that it provided the French with "dead ground" or places where they could approach without coming under cannon fire.

At 8:00 am on 7 March, Vorontsov deployed his corps facing east in three lines, spaced 400 to 500 yards (366 to 457 m) apart. The first Russian line was 1.5 miles (2 km) long and a distance of 1,100 yards (1 km) west of Heurtebise Farm. The first line consisted of 14 battalions of Nikolay Vasilyevich Vuich's 24th Division, Mikhail Ponset's brigade of the 14th Division and the 13th Jägers. On the right of the first line were the Pavlograd Hussars and four Cossack regiments under Alexander Christoforovich Benkendorf. The 14th Jägers held the Heurtebise Farm and drew up in skirmish formation in front of the first line. The advance force was led by Afanasy Ivanovich Krasovsky and included two squadrons of the Pavlograd Hussars on the jägers' right. The village of Ailles on the left flank was held by skirmishers.

The Russian second line was made up of the seven battalions of Vasily Laptiev's 21st Division. The third line under Pavel Aleksandrovich Stroganov comprised nine battalions in Nikolay Nikolaevich Hovansky's 12th Division and Sergey Fyodorovich Zheltukhin's brigade of 13th Division. Nikolay Diomidovich Myakinin commanded the corps artillery which deployed 12 heavy and 24 light guns in the center under Colonel Vinspar. The 12 guns of Horse Artillery Battery Nr. 11 were on the right flank and the 12 guns of Horse Battery Nr. 9 were on the left. Six guns of Heavy Foot Battery Nr. 28 were of the left of the second line dominating the slope on the left. There were 24 light and six heavy guns held in reserve. During the battle 18 guns from the reserve were brought forward as replacements while 12 guns were used during the retreat. Since 1811 Russian artillery batteries each numbered 12 field pieces.

According to one authority, Vorontsov commanded roughly 16,300 infantry, 1,000 regular cavalry, 1,000 Cossacks and 96 artillery pieces. Farther east at Cerny-en-Laonnois were 4,000 regular cavalry led by Ilarion Vasilievich Vasilshikov and 1,500 Cossacks under Akim Akimovich Karpov. This cavalry force was part of Sacken's command. Sacken's infantry was posted too far east to help Vorontsov. A second source credited Vorontsov with 16,000 infantry, 2,000 cavalry and 96 guns, plus Vasilshikov's 4,000 horsemen.

Napoleon had 23,573 infantry and 6,350 cavalry available, plus 102 guns. However, the 8,000 men from the Guard divisions of Christiani and Poret de Morvan were not destined to be used. One historian credited Napoleon with 30,000 troops and the Allies with 50,000. Napoleon planned to launch a frontal assault on Vorontsov's Russians, using Marshal Claude Perrin Victor's corps and Curial's division. These formations were to be assisted by Friant's division and the reserve artillery. On the French right flank Marshal Michel Ney would lead the divisions of Meunier and Pierre Boyer to attack. On the left, Nansouty was instructed to lead Exelmans and Pac to turn the Russian flank. By 8:00 am, Napoleon was aware that his enemies intended to fight.

=== Russian generals ===
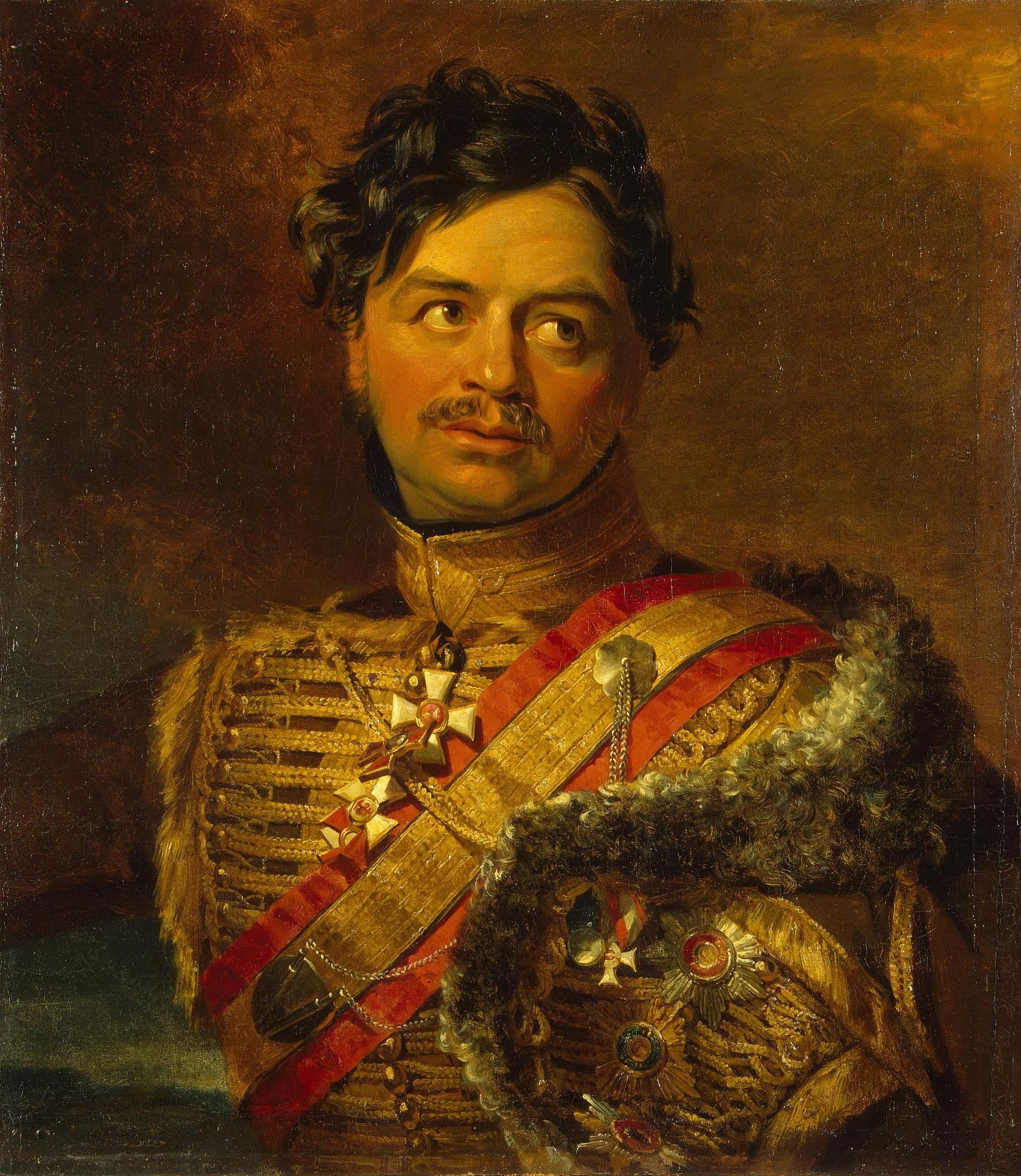
General-Leutnant Ilarion V. Vasilshikov

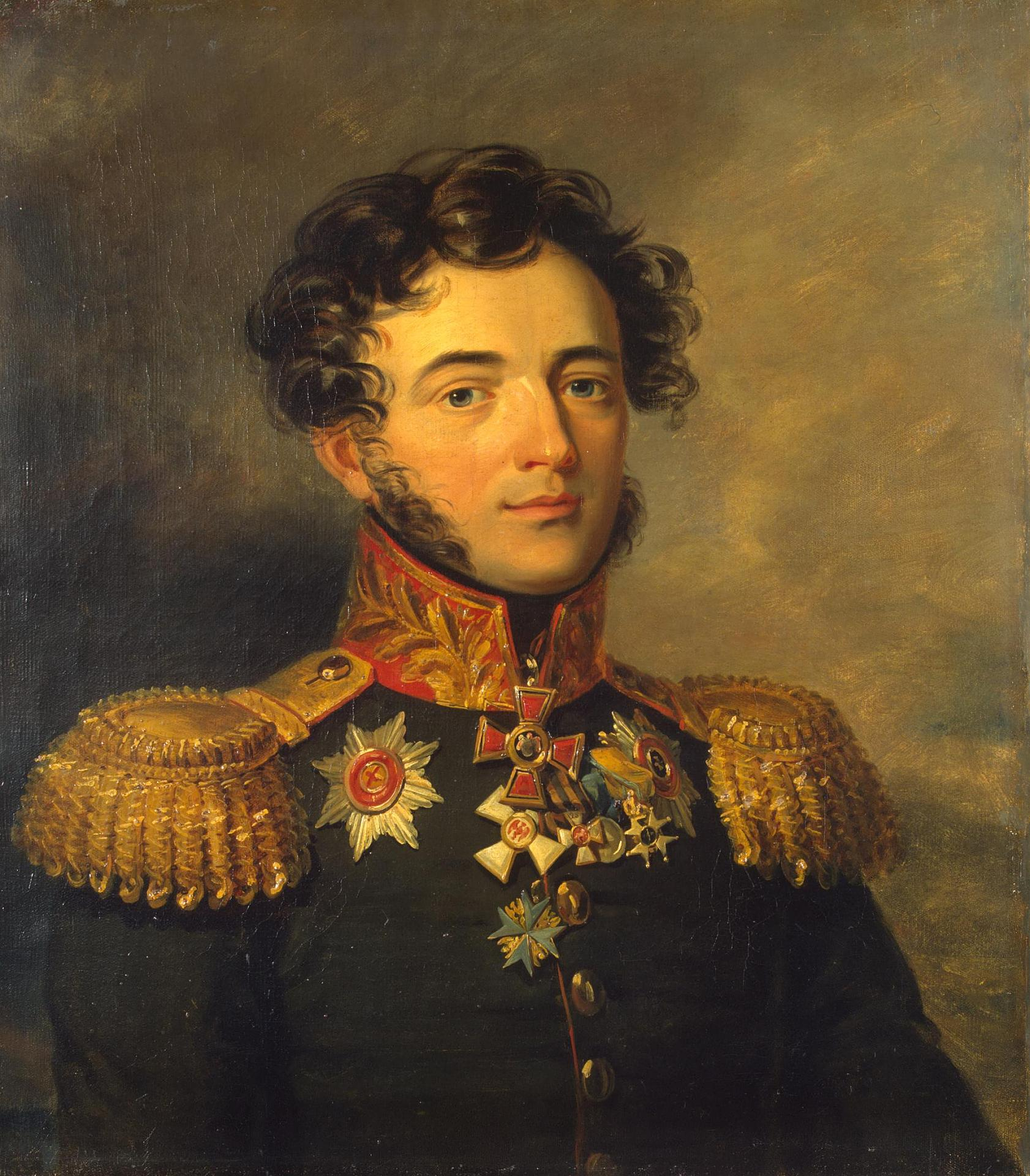
Generalmajor Sergey F. Zheltukhin

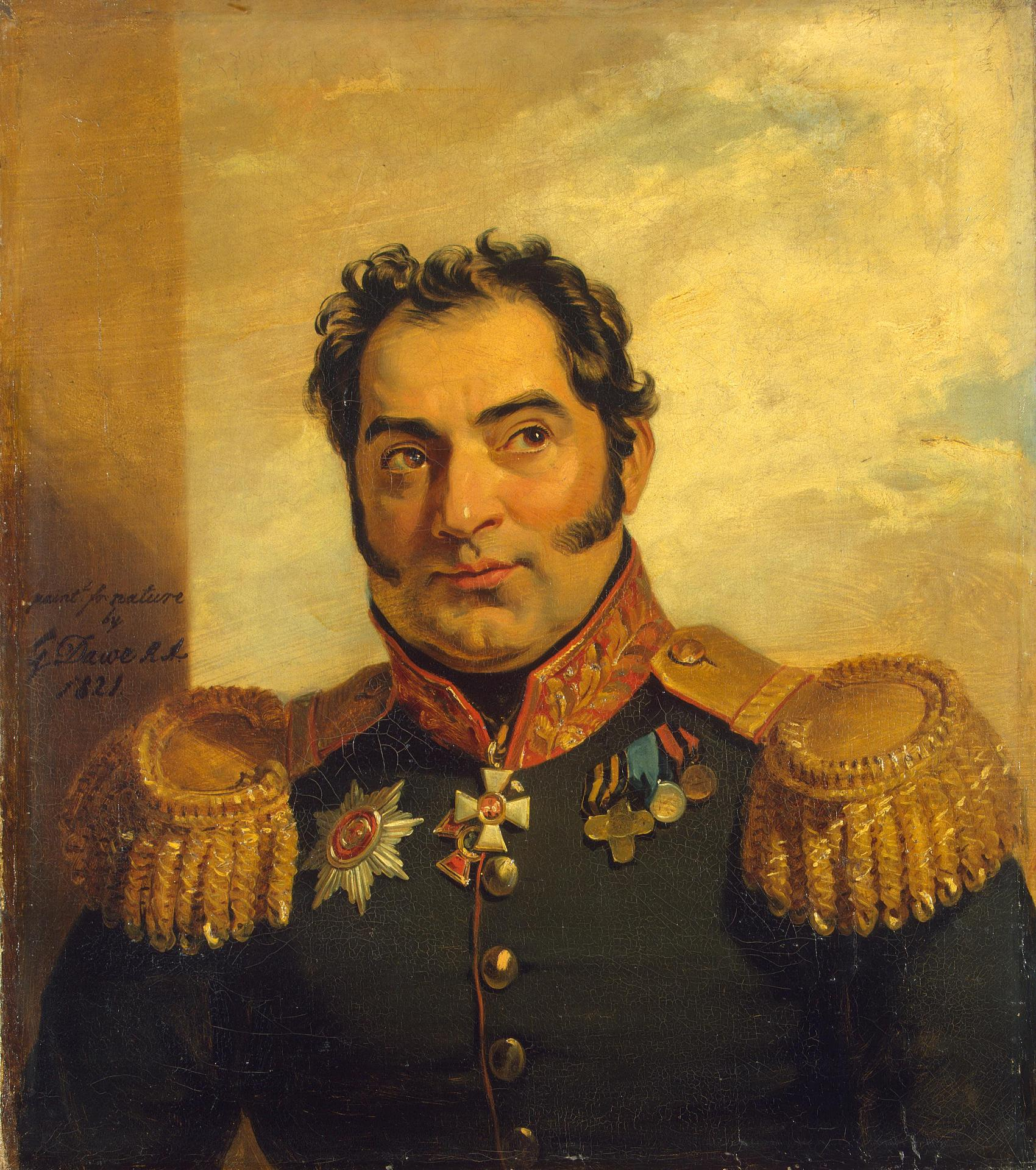
Generalmajor Nikolay V. Vuich

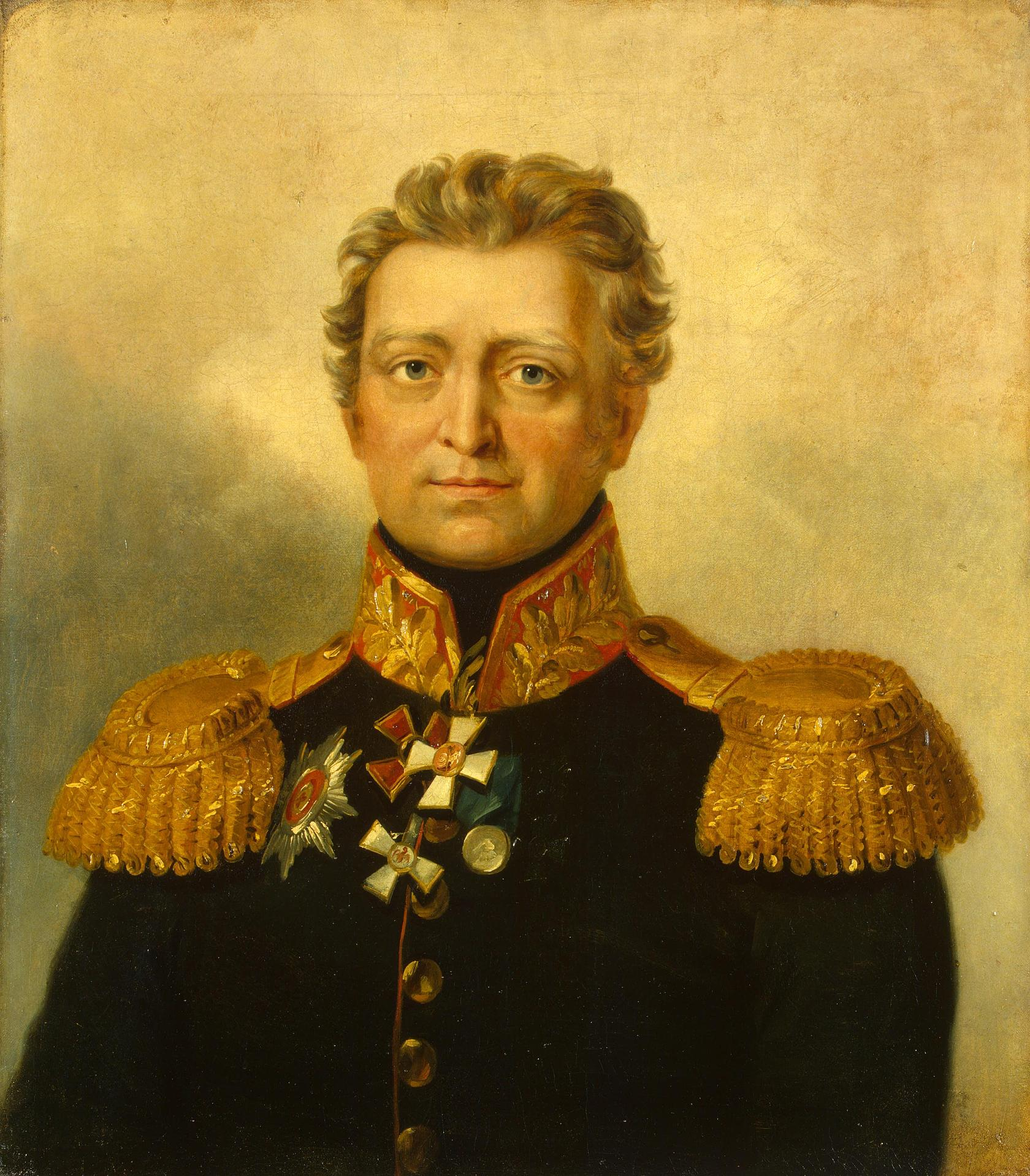
Generalmajor Vasily I. Harpe

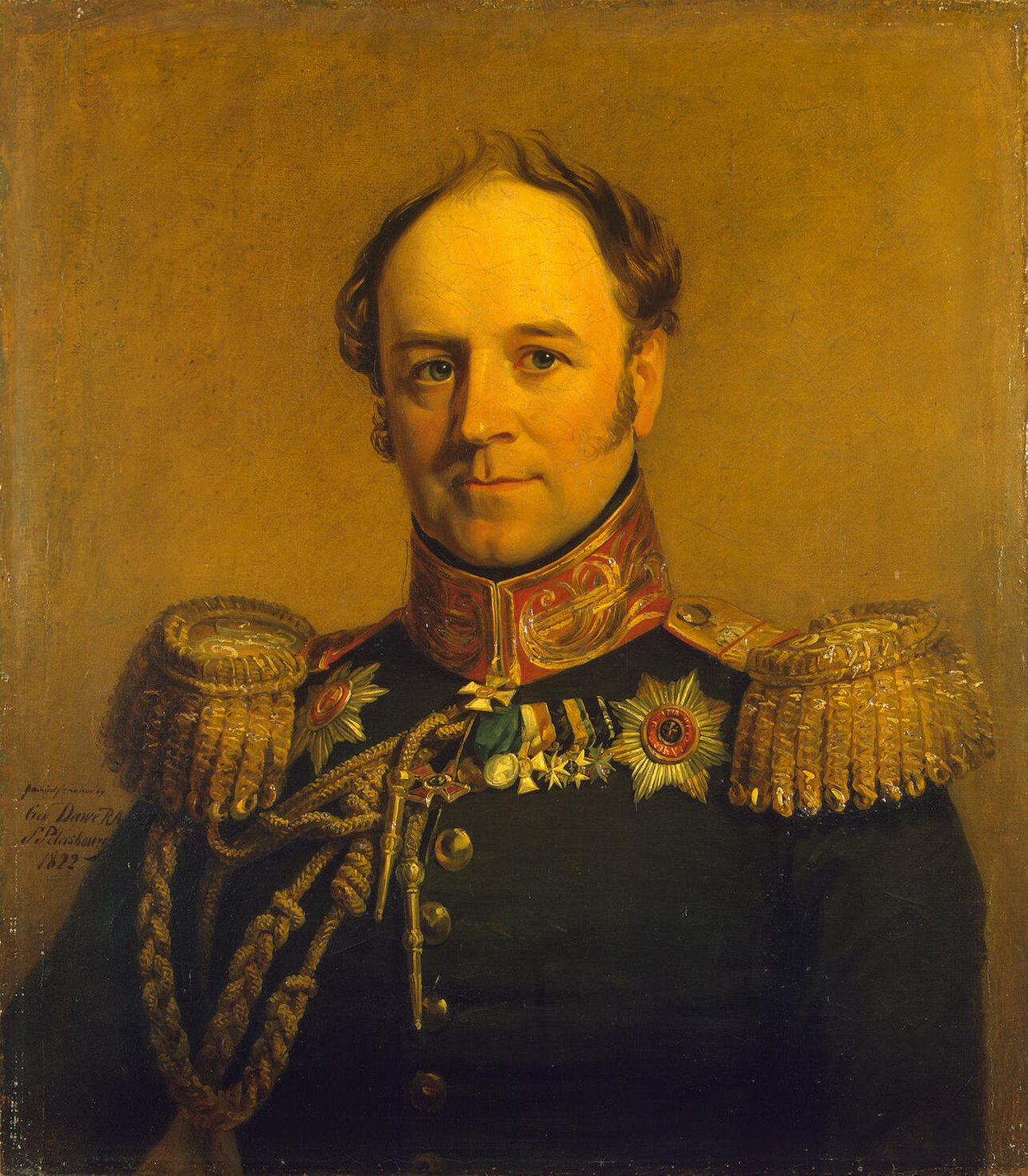
Generalmajor Alexander K. Benkendorf

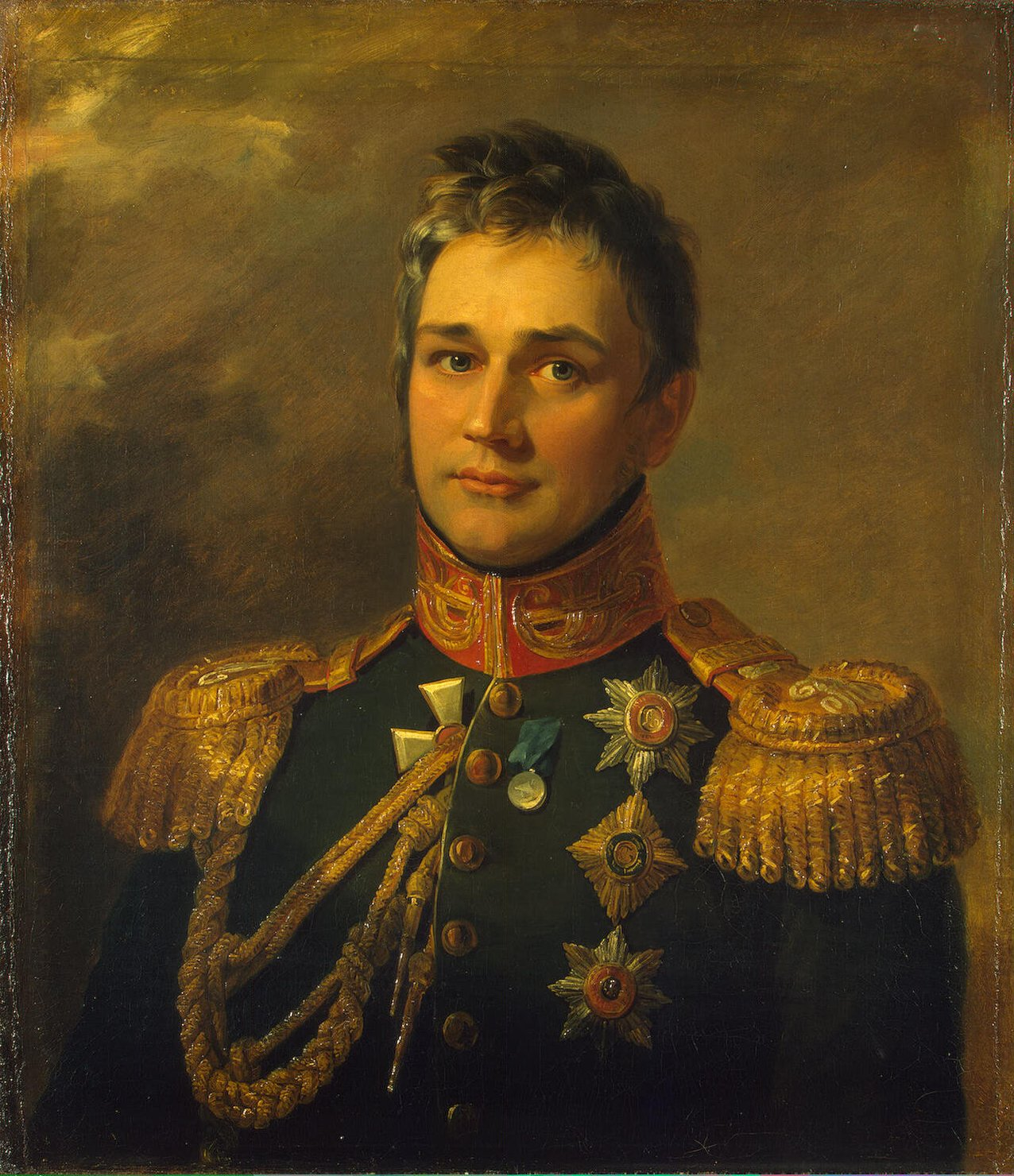
General-Leutnant Mikhail S. Vorontsov

=== French generals ===
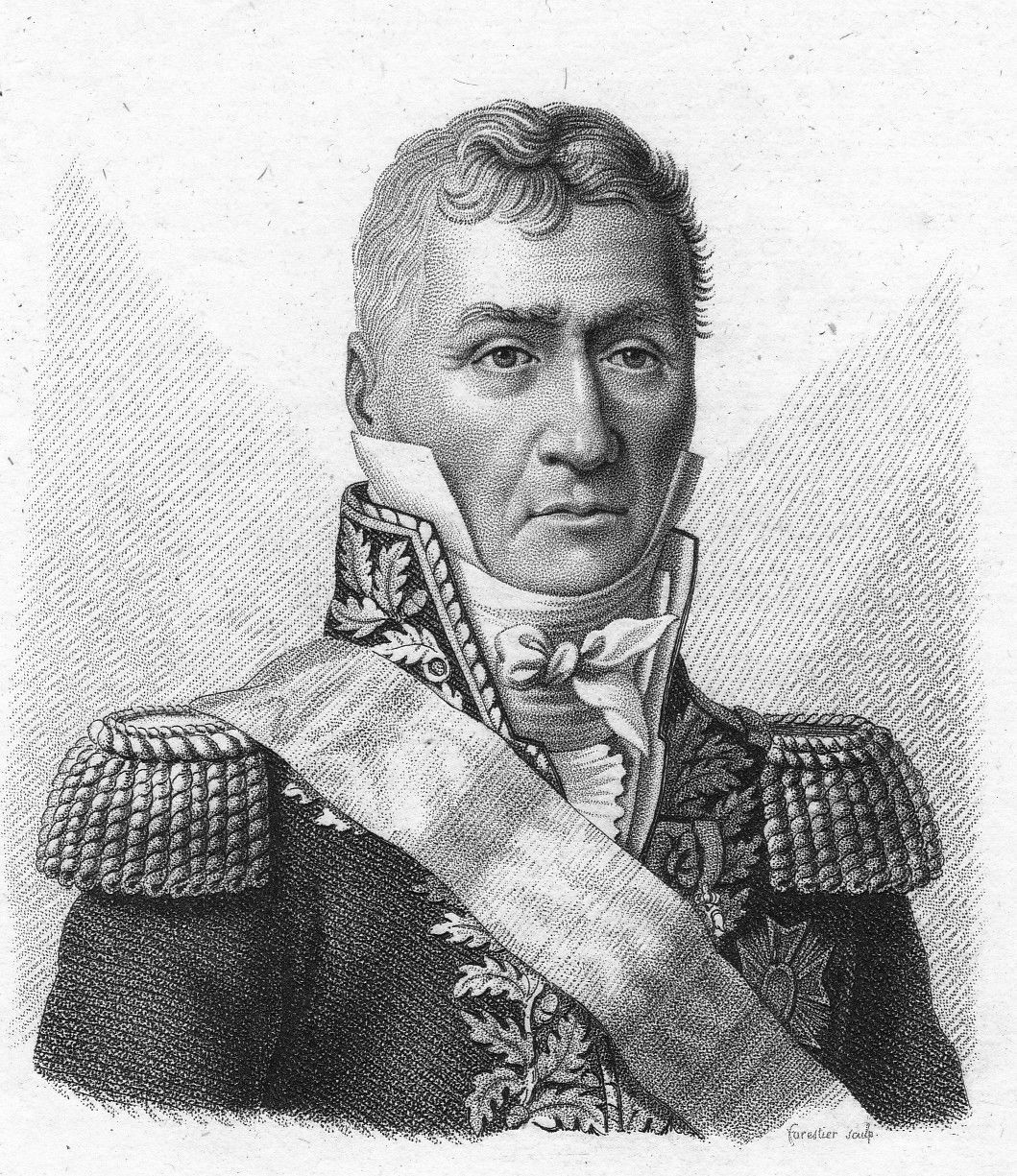
General of Division Louis Friant

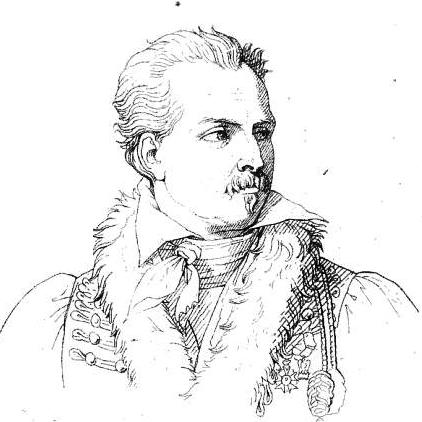
French General of Division Pierre Boyer

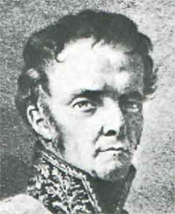
General of Division Philibert Curial

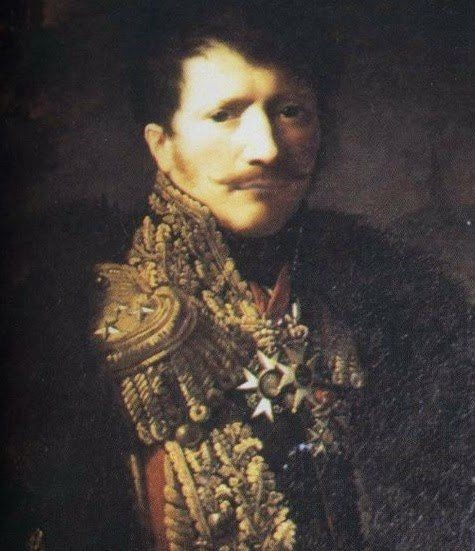
General of Division Pierre Colbert

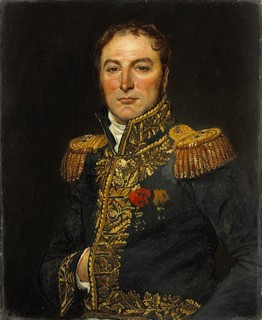
General of Division Claude Meunier

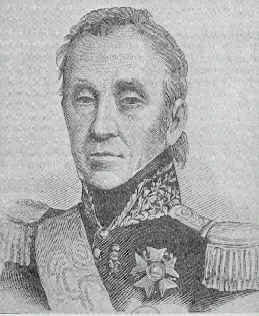
General of Division Rémi Exelmans

=== 7 March: Fighting ===
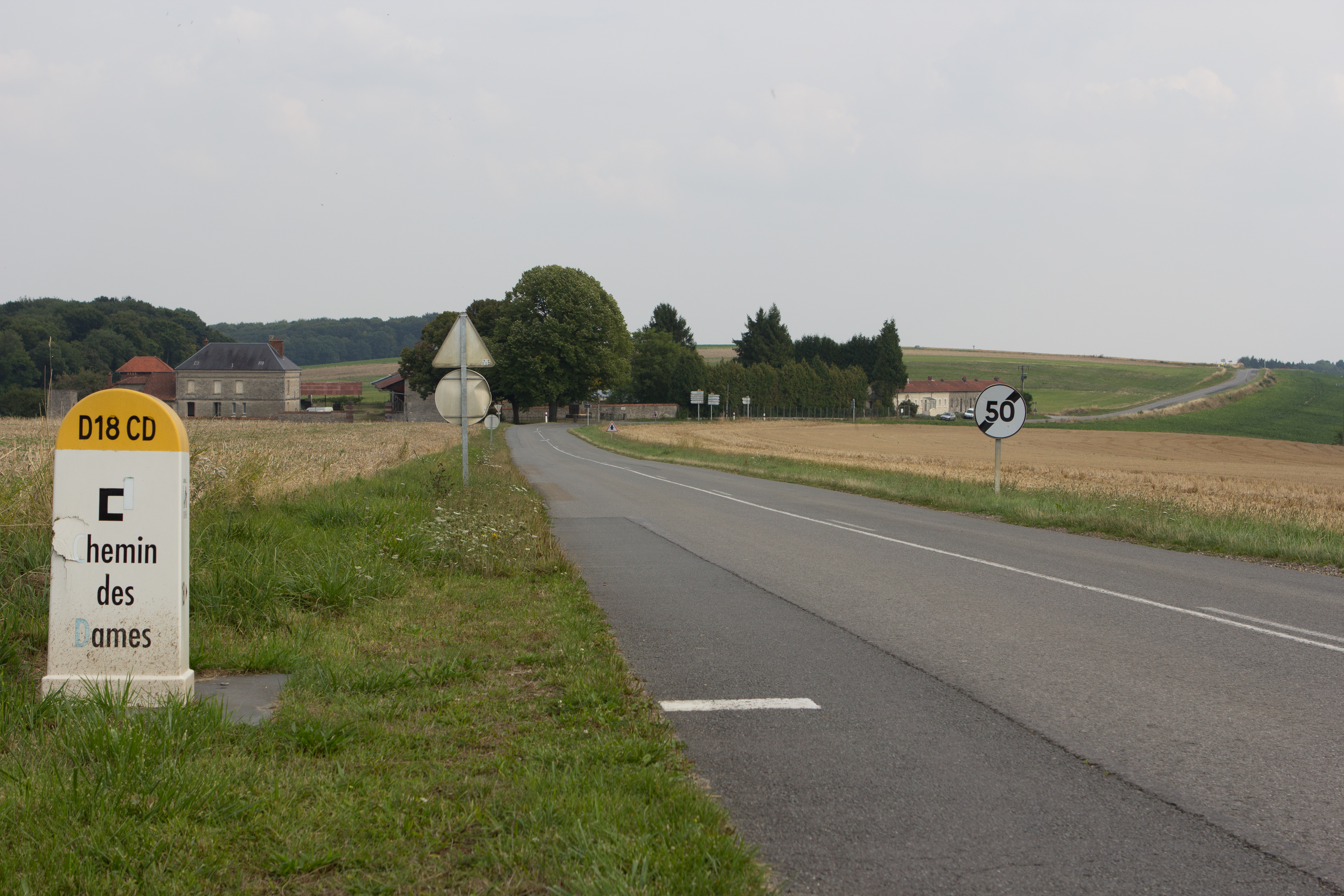
The view is east along the Chemin des Dames with Heurtebise Farm at left. The French advance came toward the viewer.

At 9:00 am, the French Imperial Guard artillery unlimbered on the east end of the Chemin des Dames ridge and opened fire. The Russian artillery replied, but the range was 1,500 metres (1,640 yd), too long to inflict much damage on either side. Blucher was with Vorontsov until 10:00 am when he rode off to learn the whereabouts of Wintzingerode's column. Ney had been told to wait for the order to attack, but the bombardment caused him to send his troops forward. He ordered Pierre Boyer to attack Ailles with Meunier advancing on his left. One account stated that Curial's division operated with Meunier's troops from the beginning. Napoleon was partly responsible for Ney's blunder because he did not explain his battle plan to the marshal. Sending his men into the attack without artillery support was Ney's fault alone. The soldiers of both Meunier and Pierre Boyer were stopped in their tracks by the Russian cannons. Boyer de Rébeval's division arrived on the field at 11:00 am, but Charpentier's division was slowed by sleet-covered roads.

At about 11:00 am Heurtebise Farm burst into flame and was abandoned. Vorontsov ordered Krasovsky's advanced troops to pull back to the main line. The 2nd Jäger Regiment from the second line moved forward and occupied Ailles. Because of Ney's premature attack, Boyer de Rébeval's division had to be diverted from the main attack to support the right flank. At 11:30 am, Ney's artillery began pounding the Russian left flank and Ney personally led Meunier's men forward to the top of the slope. Nansouty advanced up the Paissy spur and pushed back the cavalry on the Russian right flank despite being charged by three Cossack regiments and four squadrons of hussars led by Benkendorf. At noon, Boyer de Rébeval attacked and seized the Marion Woods. Early in the action, a bullet hit Victor in the thigh, putting him out of action. On the Russian side, Krasovsky was also quickly wounded and compelled to leave the field. Boyer de Rébeval's advance was carried out by Auguste Julien Bigarré's brigade with Jacques Lecapitaine's brigade in reserve. They were supported by six batteries of Guard artillery plus 12 their own guns. Since Boyer de Rébeval's men were raw conscripts with only 20 days of service their musketry and cannon fire was not very effective.

By 1:00 pm, the Russians threatened to drive the troops of Meunier and Boyer de Rébeval off the ridge. Boyer de Rébeval brought up Lecapitaine's brigade on Bigarré's left. Vorontsov committed Andrey Savvich Glebov's brigade from the third line into the fight. The 19th Jäger and Shirvan Infantry Regiments pressed forward but Antoine Drouot moved up two Guard artillery batteries and their fire halted the Russian attack. At 1:30 pm Napoleon ordered Emmanuel de Grouchy to commit his cavalry in an effort to get the attack moving. Grouchy sent Louis Ernest Joseph Sparre's dragoon brigade forward. Sparre's troopers drove off the Pavlograd Hussars and then swept into Parkinson's Horse Artillery Battery Nr. 9, cutting down the gunners. Both Grouchy and Sparre were wounded and the dragoons were forced to retreat. Boyer de Rébeval's division fell back into the Marion Woods where it rallied.

At 1:45 pm, Laferrière's 3rd Guard Cavalry Division charged the large Russian battery in the center. The elite horsemen got among the cannons but were unable to break the Russian foot soldiers behind the guns, who were formed in squares. Laferrière was badly wounded and his horsemen were met by intense fire. However, by the time the Russians forced the Guard cavalry to retire, Charpentier's division reached the field and easily captured the Quatre Heures Woods. They were soon followed by Curial's division. By 2:30 pm, Charpentier's troops linked up with Nansouty's horsemen on the French left and together they began to force back the Russian right flank. Nansouty reached the end of the Paissy valley before being turned back by cannon fire. By this time Ney had brought Meunier's division onto the ridge and the Guard artillery moved forward. Pierre Boyer reported seeing an Allied force to the north; this was Kleist's corps moving east.

That morning, having failed to reconnoiter the roads, Winzingerode selected a bad route. Meanwhile, Kleist selected a more direct route and the two columns crossed at Chevregny at 11:00 am, causing a traffic jam. Kleist finally arrived at Festieux at 4:00 pm. Blücher caught up with Winzingerode at 2:00 pm at Bruyères-et-Montbérault and realized there was no chance to carry out the intended attack on Napoleon's east flank. Anxious that Sacken and Vorontsov were in danger, Blücher ordered those generals to retreat. Sacken received his orders at 3:00 pm. He instructed his cavalry to assist Vorontsov and sent his infantry north toward Laon. Vorontsov withdrew 22 dismounted guns and his wounded. He formed his infantry into a checkerboard of mutually-supporting squares and began to retreat to the west on the Chemin des Dames plateau.

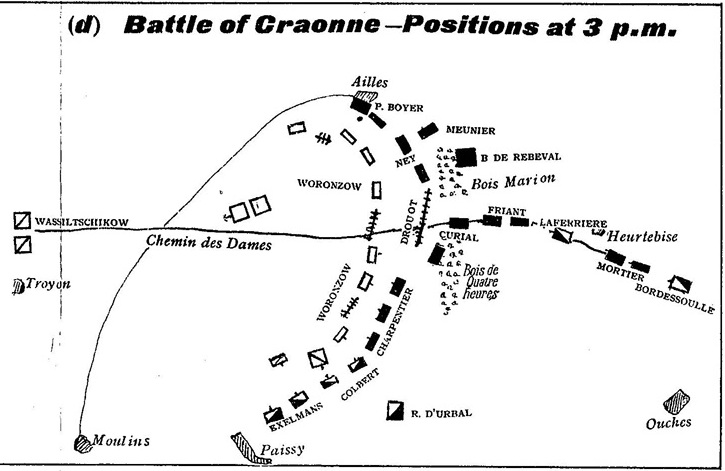
Battle of Craonne at 3 pm - the final French attack.

At 2:30 pm Napoleon decided to launch the decisive blow. The reserve artillery was brought forward and placed in battery beside the guns belonging to Victor's divisions and the Guard. Under the orders of Drouot, 88 guns pummeled the Russian infantry with grapeshot. The divisions of Friant and Curial pressed forward, supported by cavalry. By 3:00 pm, the 2nd and 6th Jäger Regiments abandoned Ailles to Pierre Boyer's division. Napoleon appointed Augustin Daniel Belliard to replace the wounded Grouchy and switched the cavalry divisions of Roussel d'Hurbal and Colbert to the French left flank. Earlier, Napoleon asked Charpentier to take command of Victor's corps. Four French cannons astride the main road were particularly effective in punishing the withdrawing Russian infantry.

The Russians fell back in good order to a position 800 yards (732 m) southwest of Ailles. At 4:00 pm Vorontsov withdrew again to the hamlet of Troyan near Cerny. Alexey Petrovich Nikitin prepared an ambush with 36 guns from Sacken's corps. When the 6th Jägers fell back through their position, Nikitin's guns opened a deadly fire on the pursuing French. Vasilshikov's cavalry intervened just as Benkendorf's horsemen were on the verge of being overwhelmed by the cavalry of Exelmans, Pac and Laferrière. Seeing Colbert's horsemen swarming around several Russian infantry squares, Vasilshikov ordered Sergey Nicolaevich Lanskoy to lead the Mariopol and Alexandria Hussar Regiments to charge. This attack drove off Colbert's troopers but the Russian hussars were in turn driven back by Nansouty's cavalrymen. Vasilshiov sent forward three dragoon regiments and Nansouty's cavalrymen were stopped as Lanskoy's hussars rallied in the rear.

The Russians retired to another position on the Chemin des Dames plateau before crossing the Ailette at Chevregny. The French artillery took the crossing under fire and caused some confusion and loss, but Vorontsov's corps got safely away to the north bank. Since other Allied forces were in the area, the French pursuit ended about 7:00–8:00 pm. The French army bivouacked along the Chemin des Dames ridge as follows: Charpentier's infantry and the Guard cavalry at Filain, Colbert at Aizy-Jouy, Belliard at Ostel, Ney to the north of Ostel, Napoleon, Mortier and the Guard infantry at Braye-en-Laonnois. Étienne Tardif de Pommeroux de Bordesoulle's cavalry camped at Heurtebise Farm to establish a link with Marmont's corps at Berry-au-Bac.

== Result ==
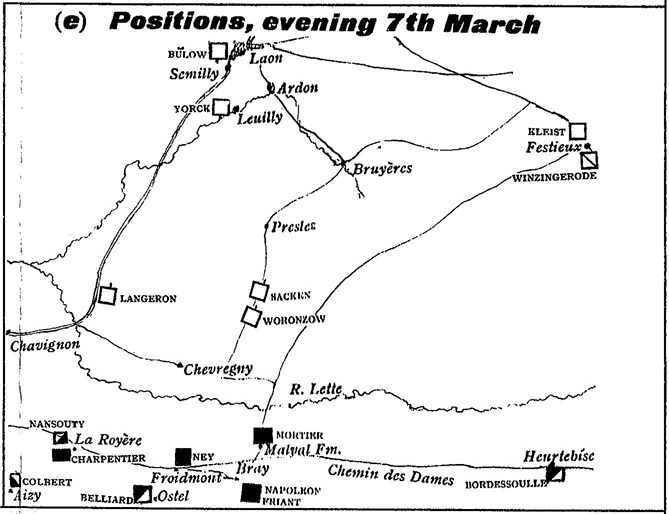
Evening of the Battle of Craonne - Blücher's army retreats.

One historian stated that the Russians lost 5,000 while the French counted 5,500 casualties. A second authority placed French casualties between 5,400 and 8,000, while the Russians admitted losing 4,785 killed, wounded and missing. A third source broke down the Russian casualties into 1,529 dead and 3,256 wounded, while giving French losses as 8,000. General-Major Lanskoy was mortally wounded; Generalmajor Sergey Nikolaevich Ushakov II of the Courland Dragoon Regiment and Colonel Parkinson of the artillery were killed. General-Leutnant Laptiev and Generalmajors Hovansky, Glebov, Feodor Vasilyevich Zvarykin and Andrey Timofeevich Maslov were wounded. The Pavlograd Hussars lost 22 officers killed or wounded, the 13th Jägers lost 16 officers and 400 men and the Shirvan Infantry Regiment lost half its numbers. On the French side, Marshal Victor and Generals of Division Grouchy, Laferrière and Boyer de Rébeval were wounded as were Generals of Brigade Bigarré and Lecapitaine. Boyer de Rébeval's division suffered losses of two out of three men. Neither side lost a cannon or a color. The 14th Voltigeurs, which was made up of French soldiers from Joseph Bonaparte's disbanded Spanish Guard, lost 32 officers and was virtually annihilated.

According to two historians, Craonne was a Pyrrhic victory because the French held the battlefield at the day's end, but their other objectives were not attained. Napoleon hoped to march rapidly to Laon and get there ahead of Blücher. In the event, the effort involved to drive off Vorontsov caused the French army to be spread out toward Soissons, rather than toward Laon. Napoleon had hoped to easily dispose of Vorontsov's corps, but found that he had to fight a major battle. Instead of cutting off Blücher from Laon, Napoleon had to pursue the Allied army directly. If Blücher had added Sacken's infantry to Vorontsov's corps, Napoleon might well have been beaten. Napoleon believed that the Allied army was fleeing from him in confusion, but this was not the case. Napoleon's army would sustain a defeat in the Battle of Laon on 9–10 March and be lucky not to suffer even worse damage.

=== Russian and French general officer casualties ===
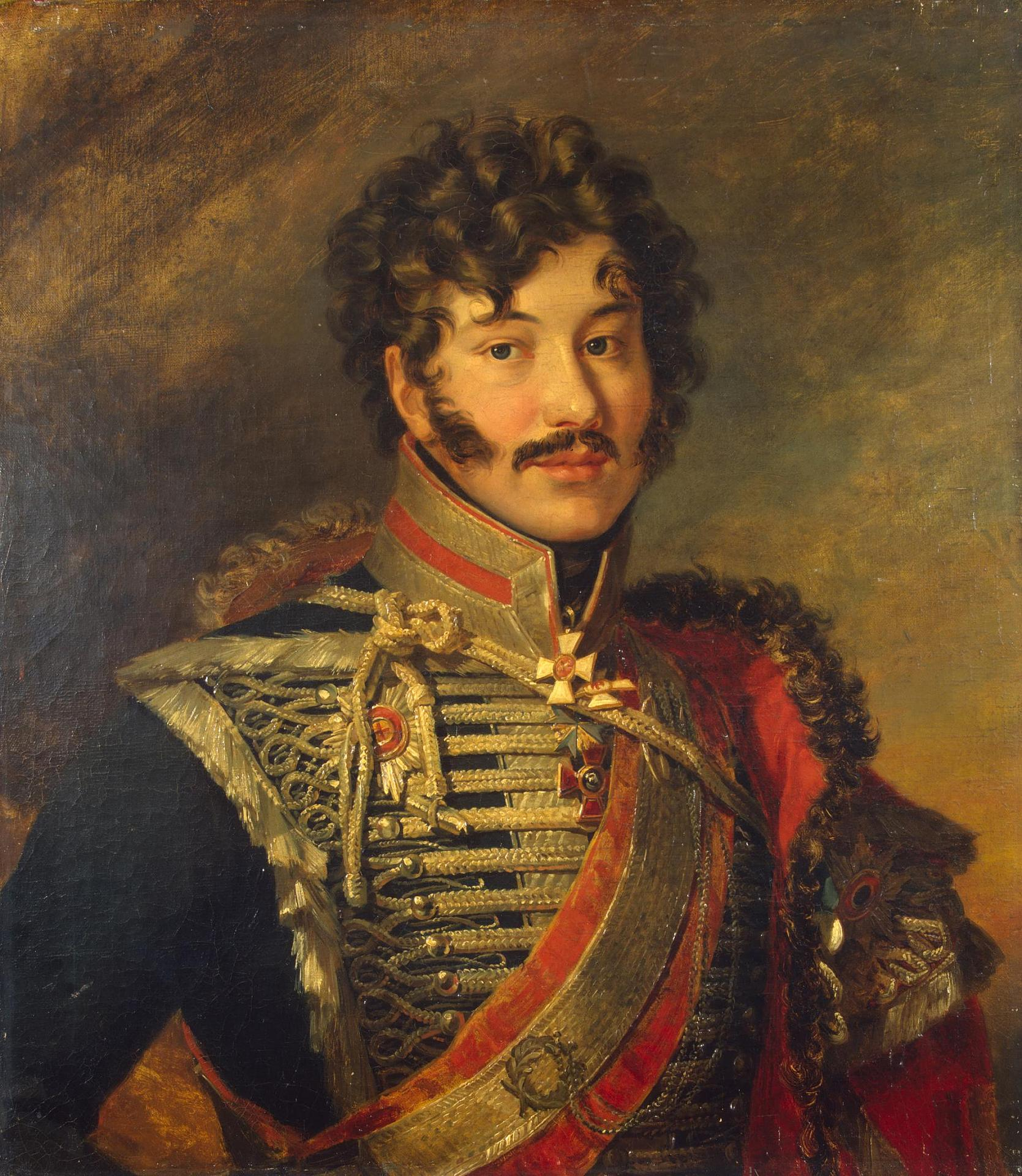
Russian General-Major Sergey N. Lanskoy †

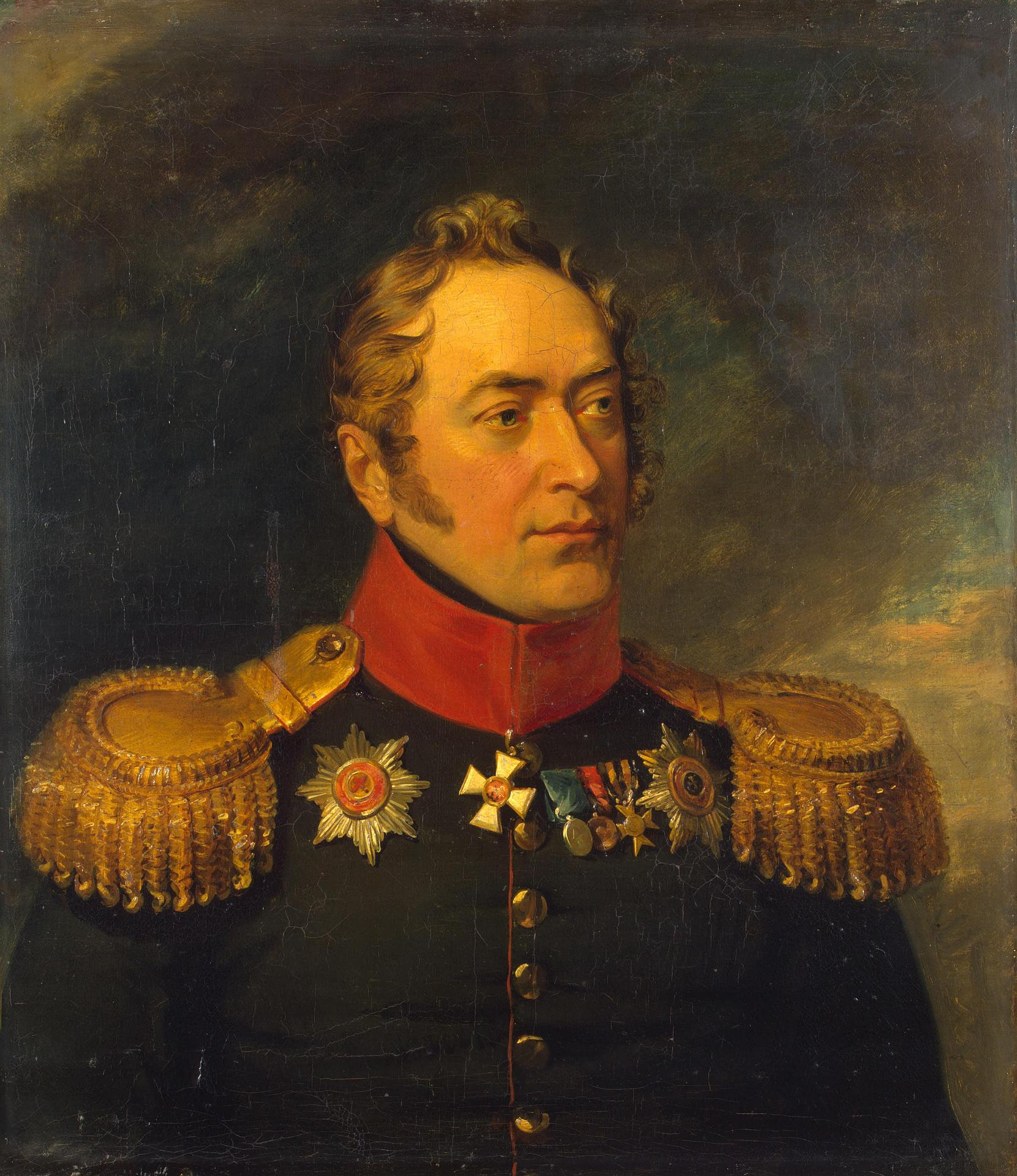
Russian Generalmajor Nikolay N. Hovansky

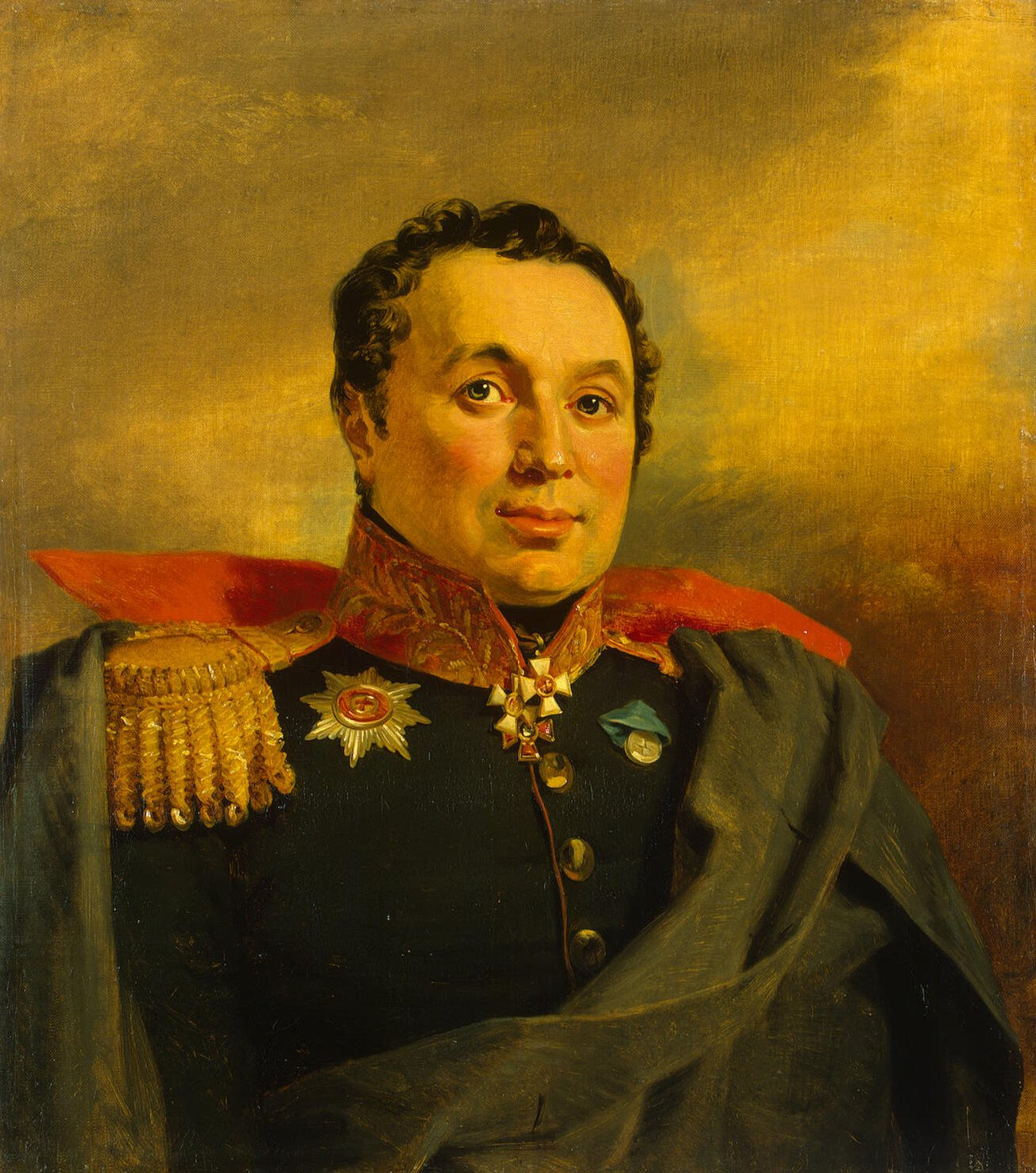
Russian Generalmajor Afanasy I. Krasovsky

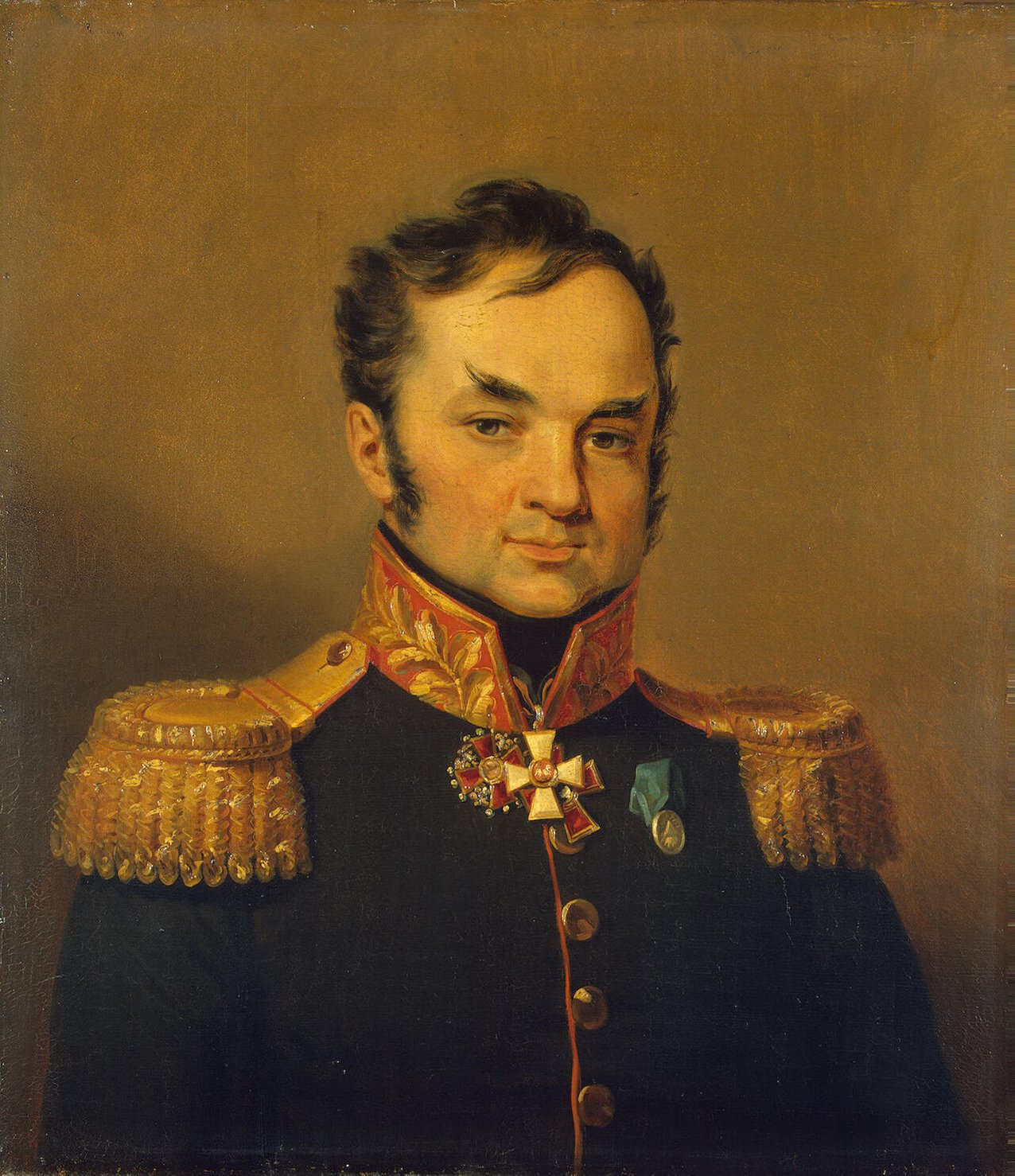
Russian Generalmajor Andrey S. Glebov

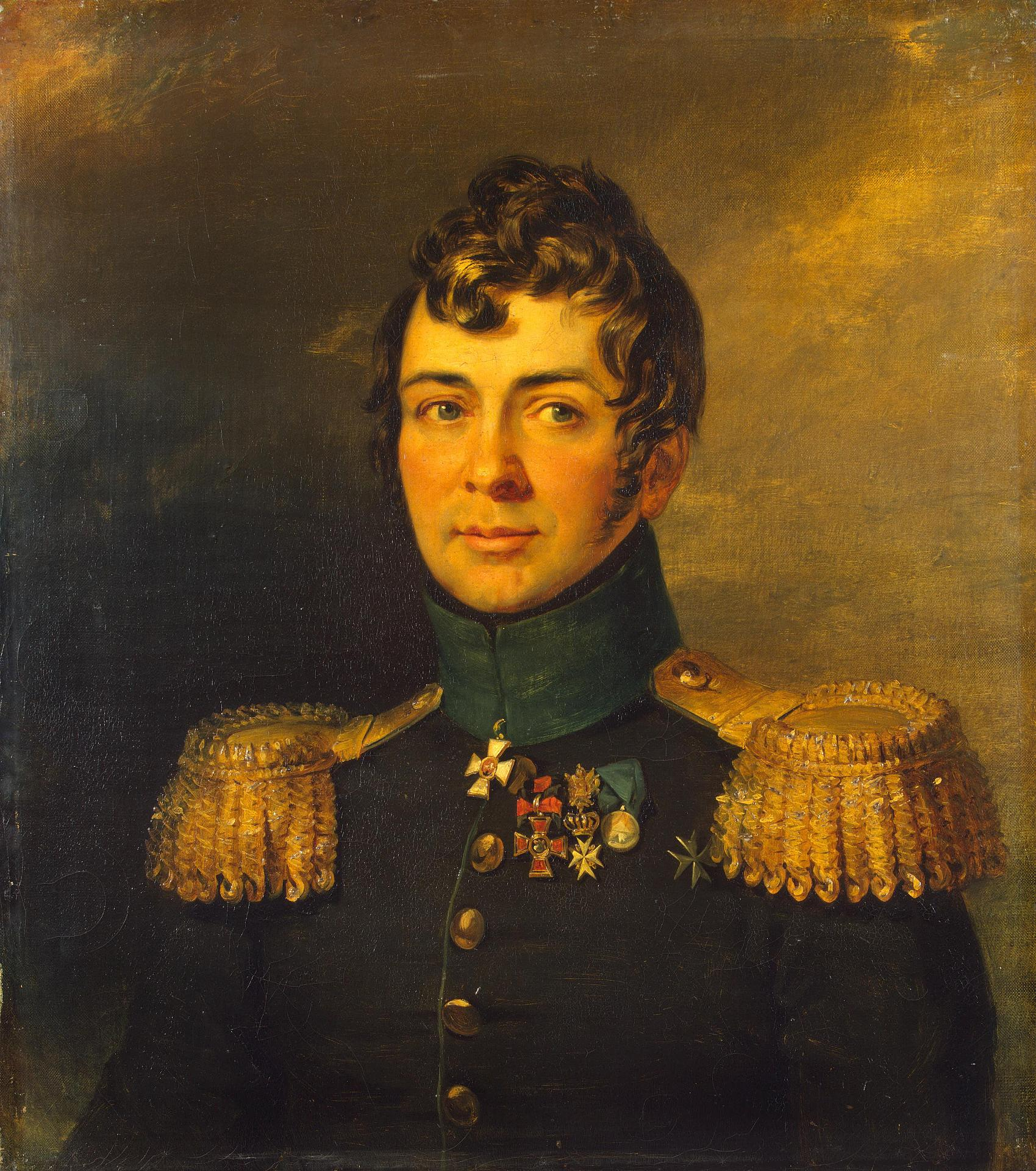
Russian Generalmajor Sergey N. Ushakov †

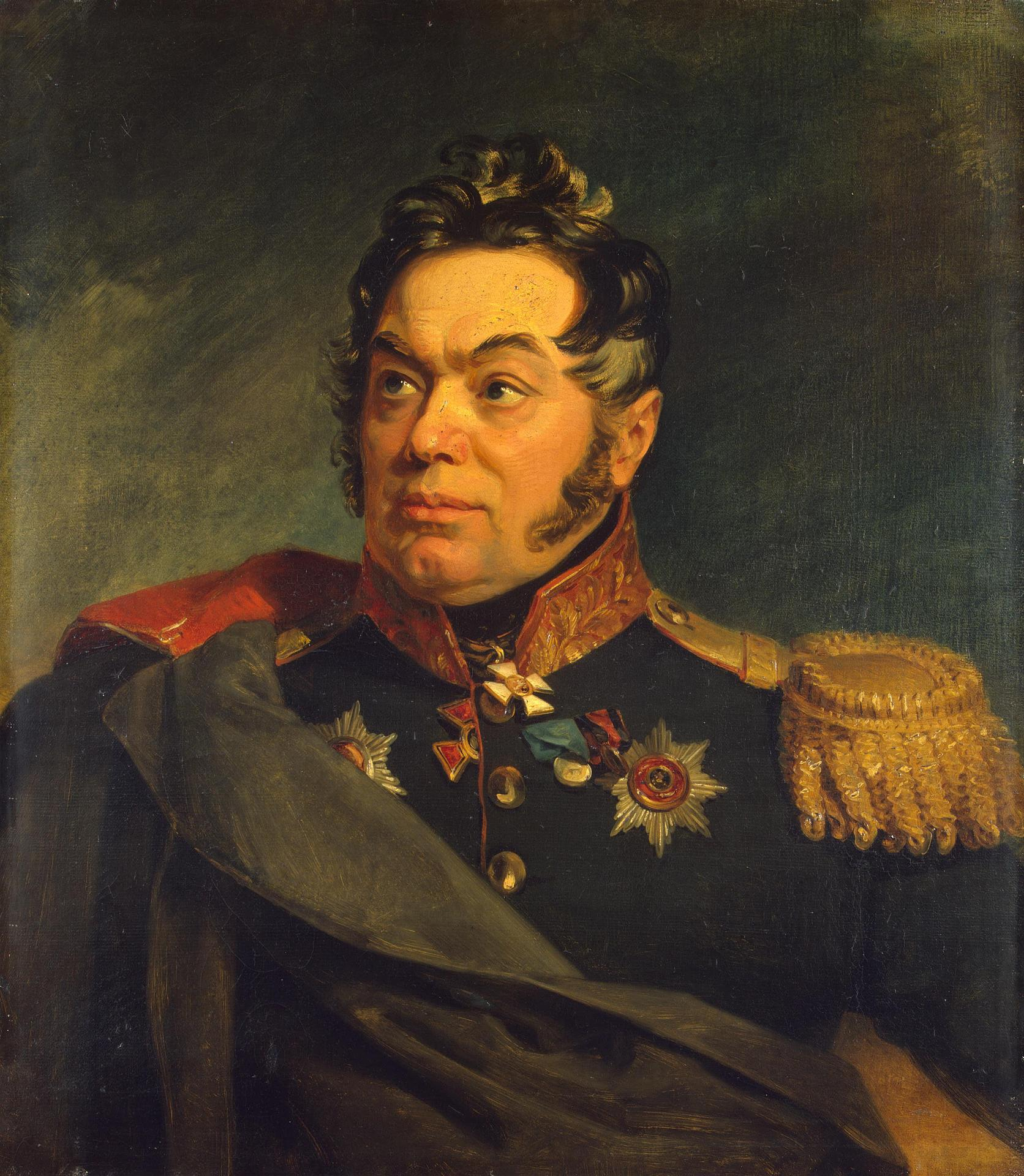
Russian General-Leutnant Vasily D. Laptiev
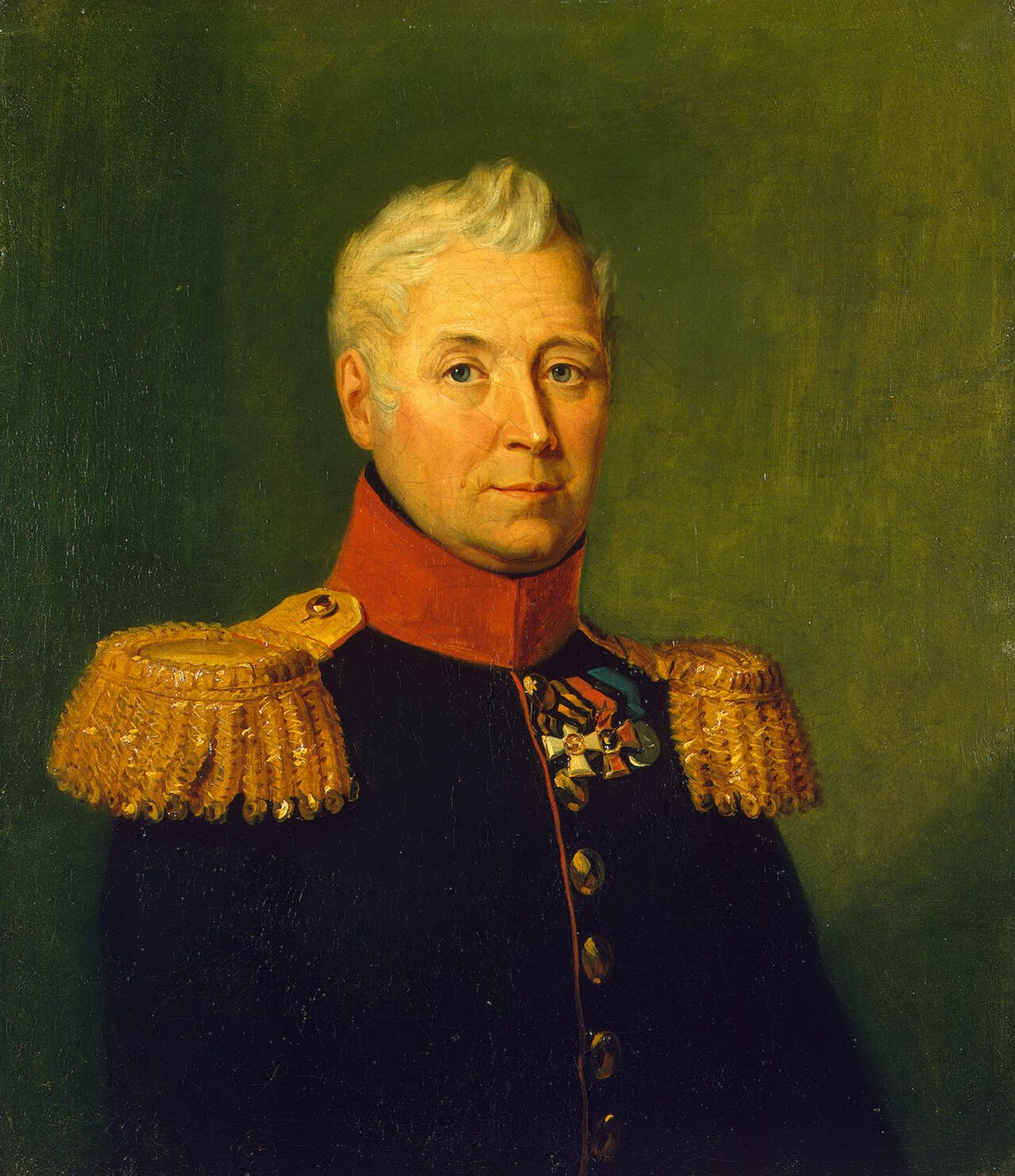
Russian Generalmajor Andrey T. Maslov

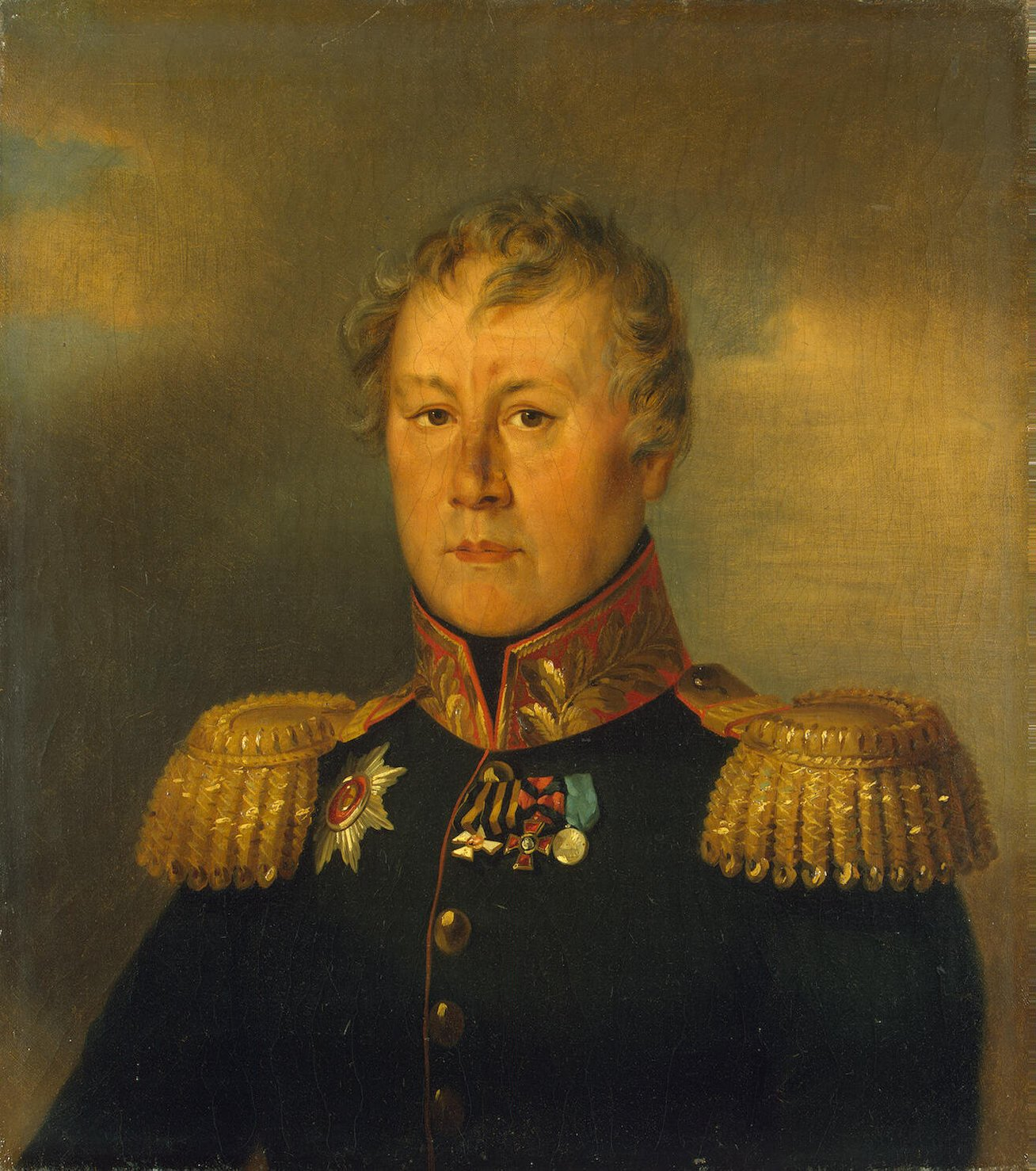
Russian Generalmajor Fyodor V. Zvarykin

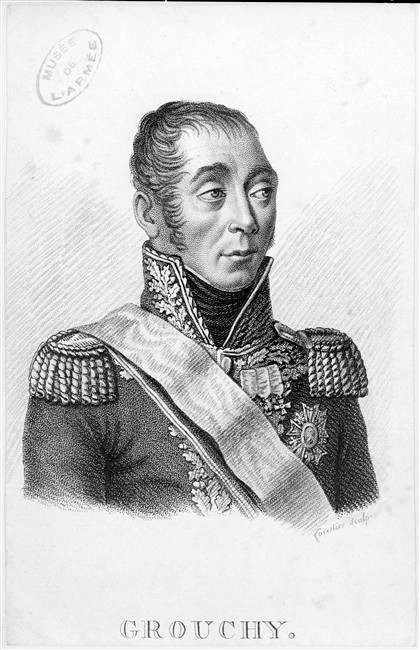
General of Division Emmanuel de Grouchy

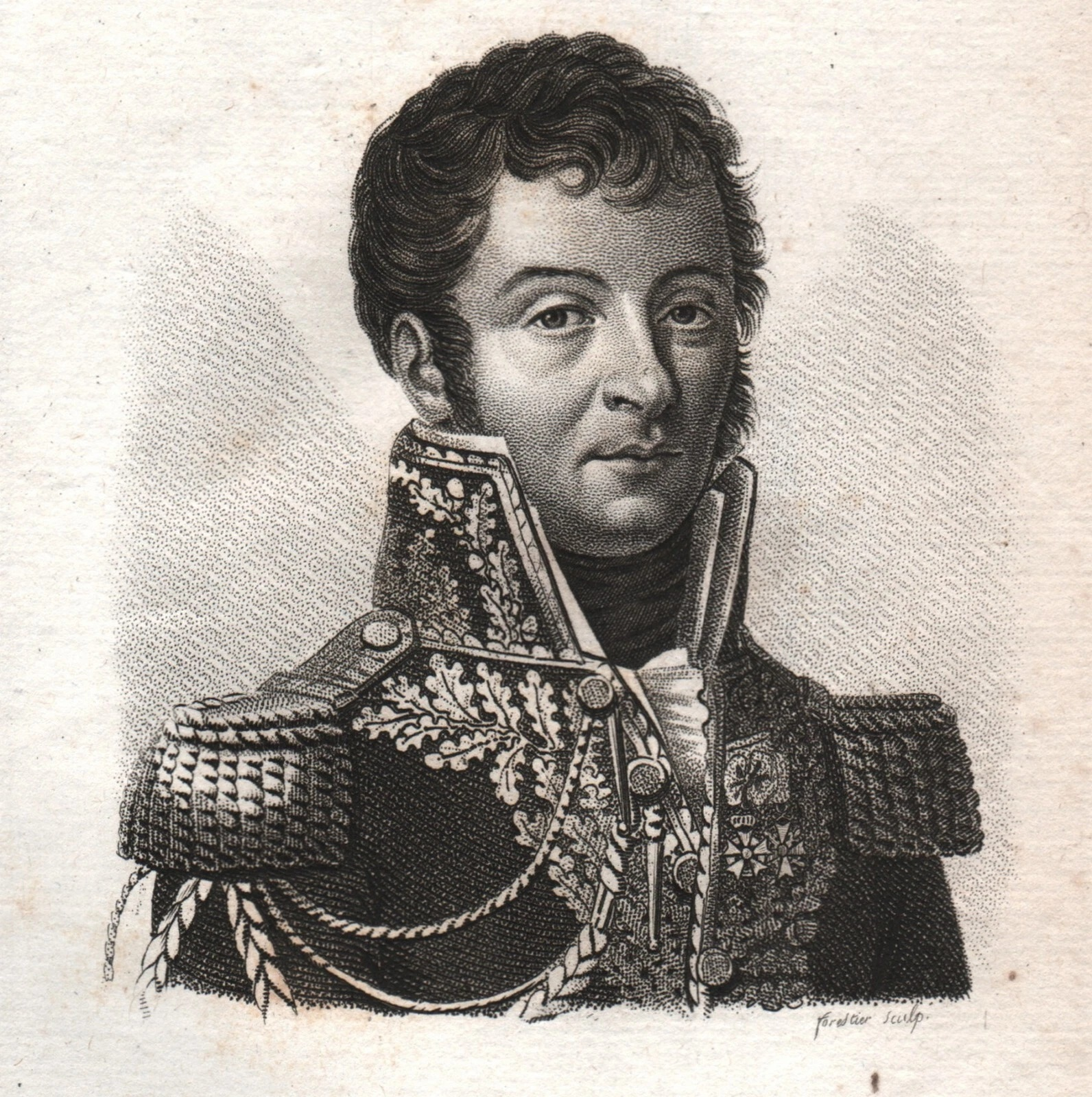
French General of Brigade Auguste Bigarré

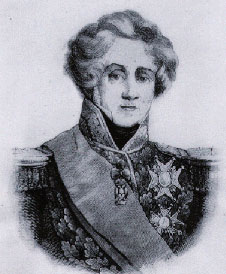
French General of Division Louis Laferrière

== Notes ==
Preceded by Battle of Reims (1814)	Napoleonic Wars; Battle of Craonne	Succeeded by Battle of Arcis-sur-Aube
