= List of Russian commanders in the French invasion of Russia =

This is a list of commanders of the Imperial Russian Army in 1812 when the French invasion of Russia began.

== A ==
| Portrait | Name | Dates of birth and death | Rank | Position in 1812 | Major battles | Military Gallery |
|---|---|---|---|---|---|---|
| | Afanasii Agalin | 1764-1846 | Major General (1807) | Chief of the Kursk infantry regiment | | No |
| | Vasili Adadurov | 1765-1845 | Major General (1798), from 1808 in retirement | Head of the 2nd brigade of the Saint Petersburg irregulars | Polotsk, Czasniki | No |
| | Adam Georg von Agthe | 1777-1826 | Major General (1814) | Chief of the Saint Petersburg grenadier regiment | Borodino, Krasny, Leipzig | Yes |
| | Ivan Adamovich | d. after 1813 | Major General (1798) | In the 1st Corps of the Reserve Army | | No |
| | Ivan Aklechev | 1758-1824 | Major General (1799) | Head of Olonets and Vologda rifle brigades of the Saint Petersburg irregulars | Polotsk, Lützen, Bautzen, Dresden, Bar-sur-Aube, Paris | No |
| | Mikhail Akhlestyshev | 1782-1829 | Colonel (1810), Major General (1813) | Chief of 39th chasseur regiment | Kovel, Lyuboml, Golovnya, Golovnya, Bautzen, Katzbach | No |
| | Ilya Alekseyev | 1772-1830 | Major General (1807), Lieutenant General (1815) | Chief of dragoon brigade in the Wittgenstein Corps | Polotsk, Czasniki, Stolbsy, Smoliani, Lützen | Yes |
| | Fyodor Aleksopol | 1758-after 1816 | Major General (1807) | Chief of the 2nd brigade of the 23rd infantry division | Smolensk, Borodino | No |
| | Alexander Albrecht | 1788-1828 | Colonel (1811), Major General (1814), Lieutenant General (1826) | In the Wittgenstein Corps | Polotsk, Berezina, Lützen, Bautzen, Dresden | Yes |
| | Stepan Andreyevskiy | 1782-1843 | Colonel (1809), Major General (1813) | In the Leub Guard cavalry regiment | Vitebsk, Smolensk, Borodino, Maloyaroslavets, Bautzen, Dresden, Kulm | Yes |
| | Alexander Ansio | 1776-1830 | Major General (1810) | General on duty of the Danube Army | Berezina | No |
| | Alexey Arakcheyev | 1769-1834 | General of artillery (1809) | Head of the War Department | Lützen, Bautzen | Yes |
| | Andrei Arakcheyev | 1772-1814 | Major General (1799) | Chief of artillery of the 3rd Reserve Army | | No |
| | Ivan Andreyevich Argamakov | 1775-1820 | Colonel (1807), Major General (1813) | Chief of Zhytomyr dragoon regiment | Kaidanov, Minsk, Borisov, Bautzen, Leipzig, Hamburg | Yes |
| | Ivan Vasilievich Argamakov | 1763-1834 | Colonel (1806), Major General (1815) | Chief of Vladimir dragoon regiment | Dresden, Leipzig, Hamburg | Yes |
| | Gustav Armfelt | 1757-1814 | General of infantry (1812) | In the Imperial Retinue | Großbeeren, Dennewitz, Leipzig | No |
| | Alexander Arseniev | 1754-1844 | Major General (1801) | In the Moscow irregulars | | No |
| | Mikhail Arseniev | 1779-1838 | Major General (1812) | Acting commander of the Life Guard Horse Regiment | Fère-Champenoise | Yes |
| | Nikolai Arseniev | 1764-1830 | Major General (1799) | Chief of a division in the Moscow irregulars | Borodino, Tarutino, Maloyaroslavets, Krasnoe | No |
| | Aleksei Avdulin | 1776-1838 | Major General (1810) | In Reserve | | No |

== B ==
| Portrait | Name | Dates of birth and death | Rank | Position in 1812 | Major battles | Military Gallery |
|---|---|---|---|---|---|---|
| | Karl Gustav von Baggovut | 1761-1812 | Lieutenant General (1807) | Chief of 2nd infantry corps of the 1st Army of the West | Eulay, Pultusk, Heilsberg, Fridland, Finnish War, Borodino, Tarutino | Yes |
| | Prince Pyotr Bagration | 1765-1812 | General of infantry (1809) | Commander-in-chief of the 1st Army | Saltanovka, Borodino | Yes |
| | Prince Roman Bagration | 1778 – 1834 | Colonel (1810), Major General (1813) | In the Staff of the 3rd Army | Kobrin, Brest, Gorodechno | Yes |
| | Pyotr Balabin | 1776 - 1856 | Major General (1813), Lieutenant General (1832) | In the Corps of Riga | Memel, Bautzen, Dresden, Kulm, Glogau | Yes |
| | Stepan Balabin | 1763 – 1818 | Major General (1815) | Chief of the Don Cossacks Ataman Regiment | | No |
| | Prince Kirill Balatukov | 1774 – 1827 | Major General (1813) | Chief of the Simferopol Chivalry Tatar Regiment | Romanov, Mir, Borodino, Tarutino | No |
| | Alexander Balashov | 1770-1837 | General aide-de-camp (1809), General of infantry (1823) | Minister of Policy, in the Emperor's retinue | | Yes |
| | Mikhail Balk | 1764 – 1818 | Lieutenant General (1815) | Chief of the Riga Dragoon Regiment | Gromy, St-Dizier | Yes |
| | Adam Balla | 1764 - 1812 | Major General (1799) | Commander of 3rd Brigade of 7th Infantry Division | Smolensk | No |
| | Pyotr Bardakov | 1756 - 1821 | Lieutenant General (1798) | Chief of Kostroma militia | Glogau | No |
| | Prince Michael Barclay de Tolly | 1761-1818 | General of infantry (1809), Field Marshal (1814) | Minister of Land Forces of Russia, Commander of 1st and 3rd Armies of the West | Borodino, Kulm, Leipzig, Paris | Yes |
| | Ludwig Balthasar Alexis Bartholomäi | 1784-1839 | Colonel (1812), Lieutenant General (1826) | Aide-de-camp of Michael Barclay de Tolly | Vitebsk, Smolensk, Borodino, Tarutino, Leipzig, Krasnoe, Laon, Soissons | Yes |
| | Alexey Bakhmetiev | | | | | Yes |
| | Nikolay Bakhmetiev | | | | | No |
| | Alexander Bashilov | 1777-1849 (1847?) | Major General (1810) | Brigade commander, Third Army | Gorodechna | Yes |
| | Panteleymon Benardos | | | | | Yes |
| | Count Alexander von Benckendorff | 1783-1844 | | | | Yes |
| | Konstantin von Benckendorff | 1785-1828 | | | | Yes |
| | Count Levin August von Bennigsen | 1745-1826 | | | | Yes |
| | Bernhard Magnus von Berg | 1764-1838 | | | | Yes |
| | Gregor von Berg | 1765-1838 | 1801 Chief Malorossisky (Little Russia) Grenadier Regt. 1806-11 Commandant of Revel. Oct 1812 Lieutenant General | Commander 5th Division | 1805 Amstetten (wounded), Austerlitz (captured). 1812 Jakobovo, Nischy, Golovchyn, 1st Polotsk (wounded), 2nd Polotsk, Smolnya. 1813 Danzig, Mockern, Lutzen, Bautzen, Reichenbach (wounded). | Yes |
| | Alexander Berdyaev | | | | | Yes |
| | Alexander Bibikov | | | | | Yes |
| | Adam Otto von Bistram | 1774 - 1828 | | 1st Western Army | Ostrovno, Vitebsk, Smolensk, Borodino, Mozhaisk, Tarutino, Maloyaroslavets | Yes |
| | Karl Ivanovich von Bistram | 1770 - 1838 | | Commander Life Guard Jager Battalion | Smolensk, Borodino, Tarutino, Maloyaroslavets, Klementino, Dobraya | Yes |
| | Nikolay Bogdanov | 1751 - 1829 | Lieutenant General (1807) | Chief of the 8th Artillery Regiment | Borodino | No |
| | Andrey Bogdanovskiy | | | | | Yes |
| | Nikolay Borozdin | 1777 - 1830 | Major General (1807) | Chief of 1st Cuirassier Division, 5th Infantry Corps | Finnish War, Borodino, Bauzten, Leipzig | Yes |
| | Baron Karl Ludwig von Budberg | 1775–1829 | Colonel (1808), Major General (1813) | Chief of His Majesty's Life-Guards Cuirassier Regiment | Vitebsk, Smolensk, Vyazma, Borodino | Yes |
| | Otto von Buchholtz | 1770 – 1831 | | | | Yes |

== C ==
| Portrait | Name | Dates of birth and death | Rank | Position in 1812 | Major battles | Military Gallery |
|---|---|---|---|---|---|---|
| | Anton Chalikov | | | | | Yes |
| | Yefim Chaplits | 1768-1825 | Lieutenant General from 12 November 1812 | Commander 3rd Reserve Cavalry Corps | Kobryn, Slonim, Borisov | Yes |
| | Ilya Fedorovich Chernozubov | 1765-1821 | Major General from November 1812 | Commander Don Cossack Opolchenye | Krasnyi | Yes |
| | Alexander Chernyshyov | 1786-1857 | Colonel (1809), Major General (November 1812) | Guerilla brigade commander | Raids in Neman River area, October–November 1812 | Yes |
| | Nikolay Chicherin | | | | | Yes |
| | Pyotr Chicherin | | | | | Yes |
| | Pavel Choglokov | 1772-1832 | Major General (1808) | Chief of 1st Brigade, 11th Division, 4th Infantry Corps | Finnish War, Smolensk, Borodino, Bautzen, Leipzig | Yes |
| | Baron Karl Clodt von Jürgensburg | 1765-1822 | | | | Yes |

== D ==
| Portrait | Name | Dates of birth and death | Rank | Position in 1812 | Major battles | Military Gallery |
|---|---|---|---|---|---|---|
| | Denis Davydov | 1784-1839 | | | | Yes |
| | Maksim Damas | 1785-1862 | | | | Yes |
| | David Delyanov | | | | | Yes |
| | Vasiliy Denisov | | | | | Yes |
| | Luka Denisiev | | | | | Yes |
| | Nikolay Depreradovich | 1767-1843 | Lieutenant General | Commander of the 1st Cuirassier Division | Ostrovno, Smolensk, Borodino, Tarutino, Maloyaroslavets, Krasnoi | Yes |
| | Nikolay Dekhterev | | | | | Yes |
| | Count Hans Karl von Diebitsch (Ivan Dibich) | 1785-1831 | | | | Yes |
| | Fyodor Dovre | | | | | Yes |
| | Dmitry Dokhturov | 1756-1816 | | | | Yes |
| | Baron Fyodor Vasilyevich Drizen | 1781-1851 | | 1st Brigade of the 3rd Division of the 3rd Corps | Sventsyani, Vitebsk, Smolensk, Zabludye, Borodino | Yes |
| | Baron Yegor Vasilyevich Drizen | | | Commander, Life Guard Preobrazhensky Regiment | Borodino | No |
| | Baron Ilya Mikhailovich Duka | 1768-1830 | Lieutenant General | | Tarutino, Maloyaroslavets, Borodino, Smolensk | Yes |
| | Ivan Durnovo | | | | | Yes |
| | Stepan Dyatkov | | | | | Yes |

== E ==
| Portrait | Name | Dates of birth and death | Rank | Position in 1812 | Major battles | Military Gallery |
|---|---|---|---|---|---|---|
| | Count Georgi Emmanuel | 1775-1837 | Major General | Commander of the 13th Brigade of the 4th Cavalry Division of the 4th Reserve Cavalry Corps | Mir, Saltanovka, Smolensk, Borodino, Vyazma | Yes |
| | Fyodor Engelhardt | 1762-1831 | Brigadier | Commander of Riga volunteers | Defense of Riga | |
| | Grigori Engelhardt | 1759-1834 | Major General | Commander of the 2nd Brigade of the 8th Infantry Division | Volhynia, Volkovysk | Yes |
| | Fyodor Ertell | 1768–1825 | Lieutenant General (1811) | Commander of the 2nd Reserve Corps | | Yes |
| | Magnus Gustav (Ivan) von Essen | 1759-1813 | Lieutenant General | Military Governor of Riga | Defense of Riga | Yes |
| | Count Pyotr Essen | 1772–1844 | Lieutenant General (1800) | | Berezina, Volkovysk | Yes |

== F ==
| Portrait | Name | Dates of birth and death | Rank | Position in 1812 | Major battles | Military Gallery |
|---|---|---|---|---|---|---|
| | Pavel Filisov | | | | | Yes |
| | Alexander von Fock | | | | | Yes |

== G ==
| Portrait | Name | Dates of birth and death | Rank | Position in 1812 | Major battles | Military Gallery |
|---|---|---|---|---|---|---|
| | Prince Joseph Galatte | 1760— | | | | Yes |
| | Alexey Gamen | 1773—1829 | | | | Yes |
| | Ermolay Gamper | 1750—1814 | | | | Yes |
| | Semyon Gangeblov | 1757—1827 | | | | Yes |
| | Vasiliy Garpe | 1762—1814 | | | | Yes |
| | Ivan Geidenreich | 1769—1839 | | | | Yes |
| | Gotthard August von Helffreich | 1776—1843 | | | | Yes |
| | Jakov Gine | 1769—1813 | | | | Yes |
| | Andrey Glebov | 1770—1854 | | | | Yes |
| | Fyodor Gogel | 1775—1827 | | | | Yes |
| | Pavel Golenishchev-Kutuzov | 1772—1843 | | | | Yes |
| | Prince Dmitriy Golitsyn | 1771-1844 | | | | Yes |
| | Evgeniy Golovin | 1782—1858 | | | | Yes |
| | Prince Andrey Gorchakov | 1779—1855 | | | | Yes |
| | Timofey Grekov | 1770—1831 | | | | Yes |
| | Alexander Gresser | 1772—1822 | | | | Yes |
| | Andrey Gudovich | 1782—1867 | | | | Yes |
| | Ivan Gurielov | 1770—1818 | | | | No |

== H ==
| Portrait | Name | Dates of birth and death | Rank | Position in 1812 | Major battles | Military Gallery |
|---|---|---|---|---|---|---|
| | Baron Karl Herzdorf | | | | | Yes |
| | Prince Karl of Hesse-Philippsthal-Barchfeld | | | | | Yes |
| | Prince Ernst of Hesse-Philippsthal-Barchfeld | | | | | Yes |

== I ==
| Portrait | Name | Dates of birth and death | Rank | Position in 1812 | Major battles | Military Gallery |
|---|---|---|---|---|---|---|
| | Peter Ivelich | 1772 - ? | Major General (1808) | Chief of 1 Brigade, 17th Division, 2nd Infantry Corps | Austerlitz, Borodino, Friedland | Yes |
| | Dmitry Ignatiev | | | | | Yes |
| | Alexey Ilovayskiy | | | | | Yes |
| | Vasiliy Ilovayskiy | | | | | Yes |
| | Grigori Ilovayskiy | | | | | Yes |
| | Ivan Ilovayskiy | | | | | Yes |
| | Nikolay Ilovayskiy | | | | | Yes |
| | Osip Ilovayskiy | | | | | Yes |
| | Ivan Inzov | | | | | Yes |

== J ==
| Portrait | Name | Dates of birth and death | Rank | Position in 1812 | Major battles | Military Gallery |
|---|---|---|---|---|---|---|
| | Baron Antoine-Henri Jomini | 1779-1869 | | | | Yes |

== K ==
| Portrait | Name | Dates of birth and death | Rank | Position in 1812 | Major battles | Military Gallery |
|---|---|---|---|---|---|---|
| | Vladimir Kablukov | | | | | Yes |
| | Platon Kablukov | | | | | Yes |
| | Kirill Kazachkovskiy | | | | | Yes |
| | Paisi Kaysarov | | | | | Yes |
| | Peter Mikhailovich Kaptzevich | 1772–1840 | Lieutenant General | Commander of the 10th Infantry Corps | Smolensk, Borodino, Maloyaroslavets, Krasnoi | Yes |
| | Moisey Karpenko | | | | | Yes |
| | Akim Karpov | | | | | Yes |
| | Ermolay Kern | | | | | Yes |
| | Stepan Khilkov | | | | | Yes |
| | Prince Nikolay Khovansky | | | | | Yes |
| | Matvey Khrapovitskiy | | | | | Yes |
| | Ivan Khrushchov | | | | | Yes |
| | Pyotr Kikin | 1775–1834 | | | | Yes |
| | Fyodor Knipper | | | | | Yes |
| | Karl von Knorring | 1774–1817 | | | | Yes |
| | Otto von Knorring | | | | | Yes |
| | Alexander Knyazhin | | | | | Yes |
| | Boris Knyazhin | | | | | Yes |
| | Pyotr Kozen | 1778–1853 | | | | Yes |
| | Ivan Kozlyaninov | | | | | Yes |
| | Alexey Kologrivov | | | | | Yes |
| | Pyotr Kolyubakin | | | | | Yes |
| | Count Pyotr Konovnitsin | | | | | Yes |
| | Pyotr Kornilov | | | | | Yes |
| | Fyodor Korf | | | | | Yes |
| | Vasiliy Kostenetskiy | | | | | Yes |
| | Afanasiy Krasovskiy | | | | | Yes |
| | Baron Cyprian Kreutz | 1777–1850 | Major General (1812) | | | Yes |
| | Nikolay Kretov | | | | | Yes |
| | Maksim Kryzhanovskiy | | | | | Yes |
| | Nikoay Kudashev | | | | | Yes |
| | Yakov Kulnev | 1763–1812 | | | | Yes |
| | Dmitry Kuruta | | | | | Yes |
| | Alexander Kutaysov | | | | | Yes |
| | Dmitriy Kuteynikov | 1766–1844 | Major General (1809) | | Mir, Maloyaroslavets | Yes |
| | Aleksander Kutuzov | | | | | Yes |
| | Prince Mikhail Kutuzov | 1745–1813 | | | | Yes |

== L ==
| Portrait | Name | Dates of birth and death | Rank | Position in 1812 | Major battles | Military Gallery |
|---|---|---|---|---|---|---|
| | Count Charles de Lambert | 1773–1843 | Major General (1799), Lieutenant General (1812) | Commander of the 5th Cavalry Division | Kobrin | Yes |
| | Count Alexander Langeron | 1763–1831 | Lieutenant General | | Brest, Berezina | Yes |
| | Sergey Lanskoy | 1774–1814 | Major General (1810), Lieutenant General (1813) | Commander of the Belarusian Hussar Regiment | Berezina | Yes |
| | Vasiliy Laptev | | | | | Yes |
| | Vasiliy Levashov | 1783–1848 | Major General (1812) | | Vitebsk, Smolensk, Maloyaroslavets, Tarutino, Borodino | Yes |
| | Baron Karl Levenstern | | | | | Yes |
| | Baron Woldemar Hermann von Löwenstern | 1776–1858 | | | | No |
| | Friedrich von Löwis of Menar ("Fyodor Leviz") | 1767-1824 | | | | Yes |
| | Dmitry Levin | | | | | Yes |
| | Ivan Leontiev | 1782–1824 | Colonel (1807), Major General (1812) | Commander of the 1st Brigade of the 2nd Cuirassier Division | Borodino | Yes |
| | Count Johann Lieven | | | | | Yes |
| | Fredrik Lindfors ("Fedor") | 1760–1813 | Major General | Commander of the 1st Brigade of the 13th Infantry Division | Vawkavysk | Yes |
| | Grigori Lisanevich | 1756–1832 | Lieutenant General | Commander of the 2nd Cavalry Brigade of the 7th Cavalry Division | | Yes |
| | Pyotr Likhachyov | | | | | Yes |
| | Fyodor Lukov | | | | | Yes |
| | Gavriil Lukovkin | | | | | Yes |
| | Dmitry Lyalin | | | | | Yes |
| | Dmitry Lyapunov | | | | | Yes |

== M ==
| Portrait | Name | Dates of birth and death | Rank | Position in 1812 | Major battles | Military Gallery |
|---|---|---|---|---|---|---|
| | Valerian Madatov | 1782-1829 | | | Kobryn, Barysau, Vilnius | Yes |
| | Count Johann von Manteuffel ("Ivan Manteyfel") | | | | | Yes |
| | Alexander Markov | | | | | Yes |
| | Yevgeni Markov | | | | | Yes |
| | Andrey Maslov | | | | | Yes |
| | Mikhail Matsnev | | | | | Yes |
| | Vladimir Mezentsev | | | | | Yes |
| | Mikhail Mezentsev | | | | | Yes |
| | Aleksey Petrovich Melissino | 1759-1813 | Major General | 8th Hussar Lubny Regiment | Kobryn, Gornostaevichi, Vawkavysk | Yes |
| | Baron Egor Meller-Zakomelskiy | | | | | Yes |
| | Pavel Merlin | | | | | Yes |
| | Count Alexandre Michaud de Beauretour | 1771-1845 | | | | Yes |
| | Count Mikhail Miloradovich | 1771-1825 | General of the Infantry | Commander of the Second and Fourth Infantry Corps | Borodino, Maloyaroslavets, Vyazma, Krasnoi | Yes |
| | Dmitry Mordvinov | | | | | Yes |
| | Fyodor Mosolov | | | | | Yes |
| | Nikolay Myakinin | | | | | Yes |

== N ==
| Portrait | Name | Dates of birth and death | Rank | Position in 1812 | Major battles | Military Gallery |
|---|---|---|---|---|---|---|
| | Ivan Nabokov | 1787-1852 | | | | Yes |
| | Fyodor Nazimov | | | | | Yes |
| | Lev Naryshkin | | | | | Yes |
| | Mikhail Naumov | | | | | Yes |
| | Dmitry Neverskiy | | | | | Yes |
| | Pavel Neidhart | | | | | Yes |
| | Alexey Nikitin | | | | | Yes |

== O ==
| Portrait | Name | Dates of birth and death | Rank | Position in 1812 | Major battles | Military Gallery |
|---|---|---|---|---|---|---|
| | Prince Vasily Obolenskiy | | | | | Yes |
| | Adam Ozarowski | 1776–1855 | | | | Yes |
| | Modest Okulov | | | | | Yes |
| | Evgeny Olenin | | | | | Yes |
| | Count Joseph D'Olon | | | | | Yes |
| | Zakhar Dmitrievich Olsufiev | 1773–1835 | Major General | 17th Division commander | | Yes |
| | Nikolay Olsufiev | | | | | Yes |
| | Karl Oldekop | | | | | Yes |
| | Karl Opperman | | | | | Yes |
| | Vasiliy Orlov-Denisov | | | | | Yes |
| | Prince Fabian Gottlieb von Osten-Sacken | 1752–1837 | | Infantry Corps commander | | Yes |
| | Count Alexander Ivanovich Ostermann-Tolstoy | 1772–1857 | | | | Yes |

== P ==
| Portrait | Name | Dates of birth and death | Rank | Position in 1812 | Major battles | Military Gallery |
|---|---|---|---|---|---|---|
| | Baron Magnus von der Pahlen ("Matvei") | | | | | Yes |
| | Count Paul von der Pahlen | | | | | Yes |
| | Count Peter von der Pahlen | | | | | Yes |
| | Ivan Palitsin | | | | | Yes |
| | Ivan Panchulidzev | | | | | Yes |
| | Semyon Panchulidzev | | | | | Yes |
| | Count Ivan Paskevich | 17782-1856 | | | | Yes |
| | Aleksander Patton | | | | | Yes |
| | Marquis Filippo Paulucci | | | | | Yes |
| | Alexander Peiker | | | | | Yes |
| | Georg Ludwig Pilar von Pilchau | 1767-1830 | | | | Yes |
| | Alexander Pisarev | | | | | Yes |
| | Count Matvei Platov | 1757-1818 | | | | Yes |
| | Konstantin Poltoratskiy | | | | | Yes |
| | Boris Poluektov | | | | | Yes |
| | Ivan Pol | | | | | Yes |
| | Mikhail Ponsette | | | | | Yes |
| | Fyodor Posnikov | | | | | Yes |
| | Yakov Potyomkin | | | | | Yes |
| | Count Stanisław Potocki (1782-1831) | | | | | Yes |
| | Count Carlo Andrea Pozzo di Borgo | | | | | Yes |
| | Alexey Protasov | | | | | Yes |
| | Dmitry Pyshnitskiy | | | | | Yes |

== R ==
| Portrait | Name | Dates of birth and death | Rank | Position in 1812 | Major battles | Military Gallery |
|---|---|---|---|---|---|---|
| | Nikolay Raevsky | 1771-1829 | Lieutenant General (1809) | Commander of the 7th Infantry Corps | Saltanovka, Smolensk, Borodino, Maloyaroslavets, Krasnoi | Yes |
| | Vasily Rakhmanov | 1764-1816 | Major General (1803) | | | Yes |
| | Avram Ratkov | 1773-1829 | Major General (1807) | | | Yes |
| | Dmitry Rezvy | 1762-1823 | Major General (1799) | | | Yes |
| | Robert Renny | 1768-1832 | Major General (1812) | | Kobrin, Gorodechno | Yes |
| | Prince Nikolay Repnin-Volkonsky | 1778-1845 | | | | Yes |
| | Sergey Repninskiy | 1775-1818 | | | | Yes |
| | Stepan Repninskiy | 1773-1851 | | | | Yes |
| | Johann Friedrich von Rehren (Ivan Reren) | 1775-1813 | | | | Yes |
| | Fyodor Rediger | 1773-1851 | | | | Yes |
| | Alexander von Rüdinger | 1782-1825 | | | | Yes |
| | Burchard Adam von Richter (Boris Richter) | 1782-1832 | | | | Yes |
| | Count Joseph Cornelius O'Rourke | 1772-1849 | | | | Yes |
| | Baron Alexander von Rosen | 1779-1832 | | | | Yes |
| | Baron Gregor von Rosen (Grigori Rozen) | 1781-1841 | | | | Yes |
| | Baron Friedrich Georg Otto von Rosen (Fyodor Rozen) | 1767-1851 | | | | Yes |
| | Ignaty Rossi | 1765-1814 | | | | Yes |
| | Ludwig Roth ("Loggin Rot") | 1780-1851 | | | | Yes |
| | Alexander Ruzdrevich | 1785-1829 | | | | Yes |
| | Vasily Rykov | 1759-1827 | | | | Yes |
| | Alexander Ryleev | 1778-1840 | | | | Yes |
| | Mikhail Ryleev | 1771-1830 | | | | Yes |
| | Grand Duke Constantine Pavlovich of Russia | 1779-1831 | | | | Yes |

== S ==
| Portrait | Name | Dates of birth and death | Rank | Position in 1812 | Major battles | Military Gallery |
|---|---|---|---|---|---|---|
| | Ivan Sabaneev | | | | | Yes |
| | Fyodor Sanders | | | | | Yes |
| | Andrey Andreyevich von Saß | | | | | Yes |
| | Andreas Burchard Friedrich (Andrey Pavlovich) von Saß | | | | | Yes |
| | Eremey Savoini | | | | | Yes |
| | Ivan Sazonov | | | | | Yes |
| | Fyodor Sazonov | | | | | Yes |
| | Duke Leopold of Saxe-Coburg | 1790-1865 | | | | Yes |
| | Prince Peter of Sayn-Wittgenstein-Berleburg | 1769-1843 | | | | Yes |
| | Gustav Scheele | | | | | Yes |
| | Nikolay Selyavin | | | | | Yes |
| | Aleksei Seslavin | | | | | Yes |
| | Count Emmanuel de Saint-Priest | | | | | Yes |
| | Prince Ivan Shakhovskoy | | | | | Yes |
| | Prince Alexander Shcherbatov | | | | | Yes |
| | Prince Alexey Shcherbatov | | | | | Yes |
| | Prince Nikolay Shcherbatov | | | | | Yes |
| | Ivan Shevich | | | | | Yes |
| | Vasily Shenshin | | | | | Yes |
| | Dmitry Shepelev | | | | | Yes |
| | Mikhail Shkapskiy | | | | | Yes |
| | Gerasim Shostakov | | | | | Yes |
| | Peter Schreyder | | | | | Yes |
| | Evstafiy Shtaden | | | | | Yes |
| | Fabian Steinheil ("Faddei Shteingel") | | | | | Yes |
| | Count Pavel Shuvalov | | | | | Yes |
| | Alexander Shulgin | | | | | Yes |
| | Daniil Shukhanov | | | | | Yes |
| | Count Egor Sivers | | | | | Yes |
| | Count Karl Sivers | | | | | Yes |
| | Nikolay Sipyagin | | | | | Yes |
| | Anton Skalon (French: Anton de Scalon) | 1767-1812 | | | | Yes |
| | Iosif Sokolovskiy | | | | | Yes |
| | Maksim Stavitskiy | | | | | Yes |
| | Semyon Stavrakov | | | | | Yes |
| | Georg Johann von Staal | 1777-1862 | | | | Yes |
| | Karl Gustav von Staal | 1778-1853 | | | | Yes |
| | Count Pavel Stroganov | 1774-1817 | | | | Yes |
| | Nikolay Sulima | | | | | Yes |
| | Ivan Sukhozanet | | | | | Yes |
| | Baron Paul van Suchtelen (son of Pieter van Suchtelen) | | | | | Yes |
| | Baron Pieter van Suchtelen | | | | | Yes |
| | Nikanor Svechin | | | | | Yes |

== T ==
| Portrait | Name | Dates of birth and death | Rank | Position in 1812 | Major battles | Military Gallery |
|---|---|---|---|---|---|---|
| | Alexander Talysin | | | | | Yes |
| | Fyodor Talysin | | | | | Yes |
| | Baron Fyodor Teil van Seraskern | | | | | Yes |
| | Alexander Thesleff | | | | | Yes |
| | Nikolay Titov | | | | | Yes |
| | Count Pyotr Tolstoy | 1769-1844 | | | | Yes |
| | Baron Karl Wilhelm von Toll | | | | | Yes |
| | Count Alexander Tormasov | 1752-1819 | | | | Yes |
| | Mikhail Treskin | | | | | Yes |
| | Ivan Troshchinskiy | | | | | Yes |
| | Prince Vasily Trubetskoy | 1776-1841 | | | | Yes |
| | Christian Truzson | | | | | Yes |
| | Alexander Tsvilinev | | | | | Yes |
| | Andrey Turchaninov | | | | | Yes |
| | Pavel Turchaninov | | | | | Yes |
| | Alexander Tuchkov | | | | | Yes |
| | Nikolay Tuchkov | | | | | Yes |
| | Pavel Tuchkov | | | | | Yes |

== U ==
| Portrait | Name | Dates of birth and death | Rank | Position in 1812 | Major battles | Military Gallery |
|---|---|---|---|---|---|---|
| | Fyodor Uvarov | | | | | Yes |
| | Gustav Udam ("Evstafiy Udom") | 1760–1836 | | | | Yes |
| | Johann Udam ("Ivan Udom") | 1768–1821 | | | | Yes |
| | Andrey Umanets | | | | | Yes |
| | Prince Alexander Urusov | | | | | Yes |
| | Pavel Ushakov | | | | | Yes |
| | Sergei Ushakov | | | | | Yes |

== V ==
| Portrait | Name | Dates of birth and death | Rank | Position in 1812 | Major battles | Military Gallery |
|---|---|---|---|---|---|---|
| | Ivan Vadbolskiy | | | | | Yes |
| | Yakov Vadkovsky | 1774 - 1820 | Major General (1808) | Chief of 2 Brigade, 17th Division, 2nd Infantry Corps | | No |
| | Ludwig Valmoden | 1769 - 1862 | | | | Yes |
| | Dmitry Vasilchikov | | | | | Yes |
| | Illarion Vasilchikov | | | | | Yes |
| | Nikolay Vasilchikov | | | | | Yes |
| | Anton Velikopolskiy | | | | | Yes |
| | Ivan Velyaminov | | | | | Yes |
| | Gavriil Veselitskiy | | | | | Yes |
| | Mikhail Vistitskiy | | | | | Yes |
| | Egor Vlastov | | | | | Yes |
| | Mikhail Vlodek | | | | | Yes |
| | Alexey Voyeykov | | | | | Yes |
| | Alexander Voinov | | | | | Yes |
| | Sergei Mikhail Volk | | | | | Yes |
| | Mikhail Volkov | | | | | Yes |
| | Prince Pyotr Volkonskiy | 1776-1852 | | | | Yes |
| | Prince Sergey Volkonskiy | | | | | Yes |
| | Prince Mikhail Vorontsov | 1782-1856 | | | | Yes |
| | Nikolay Vuich | 1765–1836 | Lieutenant General | Commander of the 19th Jaeger Regiment | Vitebsk, Smolensk, Borodino | Yes |

== W ==
| Portrait | Name | Dates of birth and death | Rank | Position in 1812 | Major battles | Military Gallery |
|---|---|---|---|---|---|---|
| | Baron Ferdinand Wintzingerode | | | | | Yes |
| | Count Ivan Witte | | | | | Yes |
| | Duke Alexander of Wurttemberg | | | | | Yes |
| | Duke Eugene of Wurttemberg | | | | | Yes |

== Y ==
| Portrait | Name | Dates of birth and death | Rank | Position in 1812 | Major battles | Military Gallery |
|---|---|---|---|---|---|---|
| | Lev Yashvil | 1772–1836 | Major General (1808), Lieutenant General (1812) | Commander of the 4th Artillery Brigade | Klyastitsy, Chashniki | Yes |
| | Nikolay Yemelyanov | | | | | Yes |
| | Alexey Yermolov | 1777–1861 | | | | Yes |
| | Ivan Yershov | | | | | Yes |
| | Andrey Yefimovich | | | | | Yes |
| | Vasiliy Yeshin | | | | | Yes |
| | Dmitry Yuzefovich | 1777–1821 | Major General (1812) | Chief of the Kharkov Dragoon Regiment | Borodino, Maroyaroslavets, Vyazma, Tarutino | Yes |
| | Alexander Yushkov | | | | | Yes |

== Z ==
| Portrait | Name | Dates of birth and death | Rank | Position in 1812 | Major battles | Military Gallery |
|---|---|---|---|---|---|---|
| | Pyotr Zagryazhskiy | | | | | Yes |
| | Arseniy Zakrevskiy | 1783–1865 | | | | Yes |
| | Timofey Zbievskiy | | | | | Yes |
| | Fyodor Zvarykin | | | | | Yes |
| | Filipp Zhevakhov | | | | | No |
| | Ivan Zhevakhov | | | | | Yes |
| | Spiridon Zhevakhov | | | | | No |
| | Pyotr Zheltukhin | | | | | Yes |
| | Sergey Zheltukhin | | | | | Yes |
| | Apollon Zhemchuzhnikov | | | | | Yes |
