= General Zhevakhov =

General Zhevakhov may refer to:

- Filipp Zhevakhov (1752–c. 1817), Imperial Russian Army general
- Ivan Zhevakhov (1762–1837), Imperial Russian Army general
- Spiridon Zhevakhov (1768–1815), Imperial Russian Army general
