= Gamper =

Gamper is a surname. Notable people with the surname include:

- David Gamper (1945–2011), American composer
- Joan Gamper (1877–1930), Swiss football pioneer, player, and club president
- John Gamper (1870–1946), American politician
- Martino Gamper (born 1971), Italian designer
- Patrick Gamper (born 1997), Austrian cyclist
- Yermolay Gamper (1750–1814), Russian military commander
