= Friedrich Georg Otto von Rosen =

Baron of the Russian Empire (1767–1851)

Baron Friedrich Georg Otto von Rosen
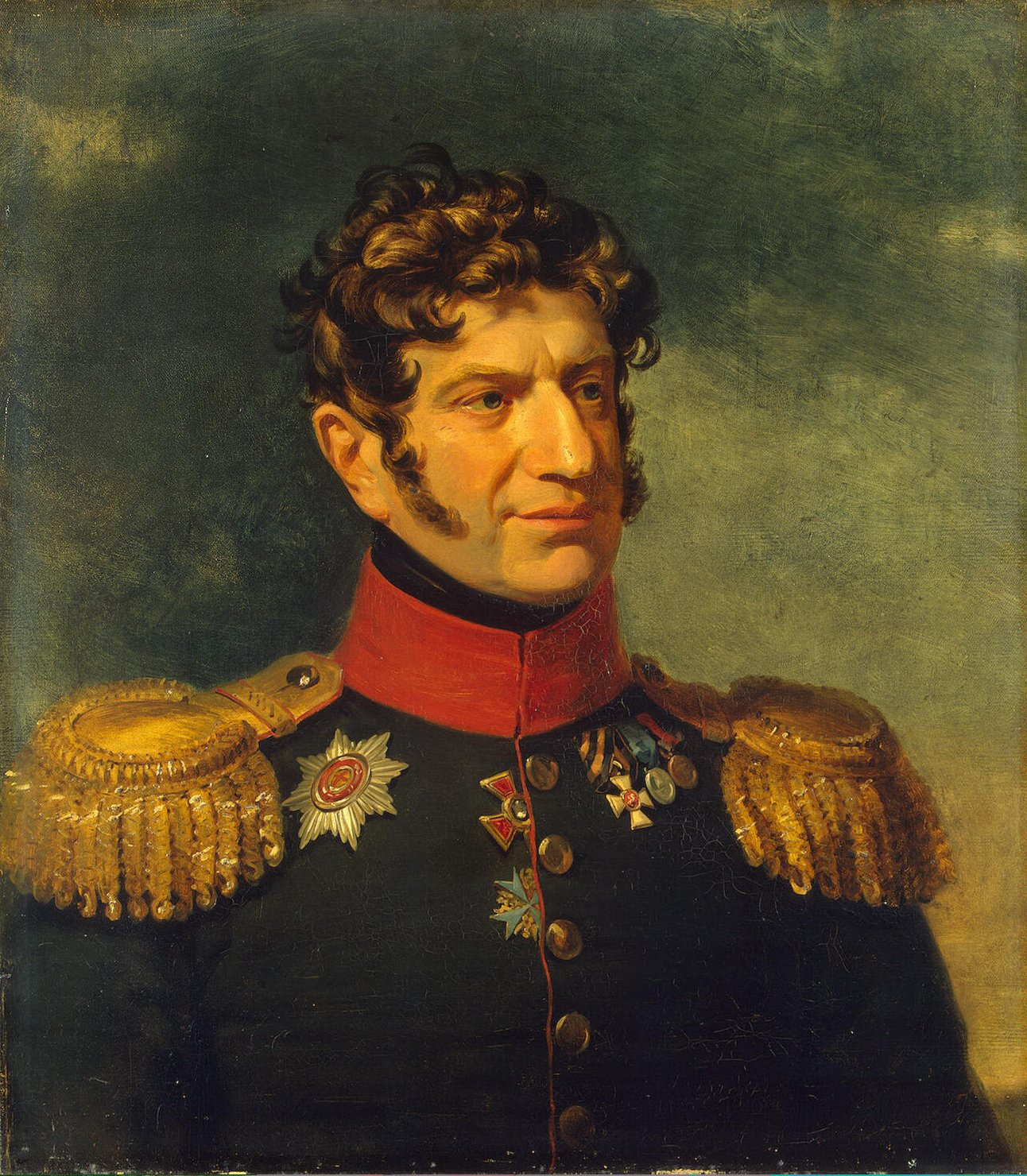
- Born: June 28, 1767; Reval (Tallinn)
- Died: July 5, 1851; Reval (Tallinn)
- Military career
- Allegiance: Russian Empire
- Service years: 1785 - 1851
- Rank: General of the Infantry (Russian Empire)
- Commands: Semyonovsky Life Guards Regiment (1805–1811)
- Conflicts: Russo-Swedish War (1788–1790); Polish–Russian War of 1792; Suvorov's Italian campaign Suvorov's Swiss campaign Napoleonic Wars: * French invasion of Russia; *Battle of Borodino
- Awards: Order of Saint Anna: 1st Class with Diamonds and 4th Class; Order of Saint George 4th Class; Knight of the Order of Saint Vladimir 2nd, 3rd, and 4th Classes; Order of Saint John of Jerusalem (Russia); Pour le Mérite; Silver medals "In Memory of the Patriotic War of 1812" and "For the Capture of Paris"; A badge of distinction "for XXXV years of irreproachable service"

Baron Friedrich Georg Otto von Rosen (Russian: Фёдор Фёдорович Розен, Fyodor Fyodorovich Rozen; 28 June 1767 – 5 July 1851) was a Baltic German general of infantry in the Imperial Russian Army. A career officer of the Rosen family, he served across six decades and fought in the Russo-Swedish War of 1788–1790, the Polish campaigns of 1792 and 1794, the War of the Third Coalition, the War of the Fourth Coalition, the Patriotic War of 1812, and the War of the Sixth Coalition of 1813–1814. He commanded the Lithuanian Infantry Regiment in 1812 and a brigade of the Army of the North during the German campaign of 1813, and later served as commandant of Sevastopol from 1832 to 1842. His portrait by George Dawe hangs in the Military Gallery of the Winter Palace.

== Early life and family ==
Rosen was born on 28 June 1767 in Reval (present-day Tallinn), then part of the Governorate of Estonia of the Russian Empire, into the Baltic German baronial Rosen family of the House of Kiekel. His father, Baron Friedrich Gustav von Rosen (1740–1817), was a lieutenant colonel; his mother, Sophia von Derfelden (1741–1817), was a cousin of General of Cavalry Wilhelm Christoforovich von Derfelden. His paternal grandfather, Gustav Friedrich (Fyodor Ivanovich) von Rosen (1715–1773), had served as a major general during the Seven Years' War under Empress Elizabeth; three generations of his forebears had served as generals in the Swedish and Russian armies

Following family tradition, Rosen was enrolled as a private in the Preobrazhensky Life Guards Regiment on 1 January 1777 at the age of ten, and was soon transferred to the Izmailovsky Life Guards Regiment, being promoted to sergeant within two years while remaining at home under his father's supervision until age eighteen.

== Military career ==
=== Early service and Russo-Swedish War ===
Rosen joined his regiment for active duty in 1785. On 1 January 1789 he was released from the Guards with the rank of captain and assigned to the 4th Battalion of the newly formed Estonian Jäger Corps. During the Russo-Swedish War of 1788–1790 his battalion was assigned as marines to the Russian rowing fleet under Prince Charles of Nassau-Siegen. Rosen fought at the action in Björkö Sound near Vyborg on 22 June 1790 and at the Second Battle of Svensksund (Rochensalm) on 28–29 June 1790.

In 1792 and 1794 he served against Polish insurgents during the War of 1792 and the Kościuszko Uprising, taking part in the capture of Vilnius on 31 July 1794. On 16 March 1795 Rosen was transferred to the St. Petersburg Grenadier Regiment, in which he was promoted to major on 23 December 1798. He was appointed Platzmajor of Reval on 17 March 1804, received the Order of St. Anna 4th class on the sword for a royal review at Reval on 25 May 1804, and was promoted to lieutenant colonel on 6 December 1804.

=== Napoleonic Wars ===
On 20 March 1805 Rosen was appointed commander of the St. Petersburg Grenadier Regiment. During the War of the Third Coalition, his regiment was attached to the corps of General Count Pyotr Tolstoy designated for the amphibious landing in Swedish Pomerania. The force disembarked at Stralsund in mid-September 1805 after a stormy voyage from Reval aboard the squadron of Admiral Tet, marched toward Hanover, and returned to Russia through Prussia after the Austrian defeat at Austerlitz.

In the War of the Fourth Coalition of 1806–1807, Rosen's regiment was attached to the corps of Baron Levin August von Bennigsen. After crossing the Niemen at Grodno and halting near Ostrołęka, he fought on the right wing at the Battle of Pułtusk on 14 December 1806, then marched through Ostrołęka, Tykocin, Heilsberg and Mohrungen to Jankowo, and on via Wolfsdorf and Landsberg to Preussisch Eylau, where he fought on the left wing on 26–27 January 1807 and was wounded in the left arm, ending his campaign. Evacuated to Tilsit, he recovered and on 12 December 1807 received promotion to colonel. In August–September 1808, during the Anglo-Russian War, he commanded the coastal defences of Baltic Port (Paldiski) against the blockading British and Swedish squadrons

On 17 January 1811, as Emperor Alexander I raised thirteen new infantry regiments in anticipation of war with France, Rosen was named chef of the newly formed Lithuanian Infantry Regiment, organised at Sveaborg in Finland.

=== Patriotic War of 1812 ===
In May 1812 Rosen was given command of the 2nd Infantry Brigade, composed of the Lithuanian and Nevsky Infantry Regiments. After Napoleon's invasion, the brigade was transported by sea from Finland, reaching Reval on 26 August 1812 — the day of the Battle of Borodino. It was incorporated into the separate corps of Lieutenant General Count Faddey Steinheil and arrived before Riga on 8 September, operating against the X Corps of Marshal Jacques MacDonald. After the occupation of Mitau, Rosen's brigade moved into Belarus and took part in the operations at Ushach, the Second Battle of Polotsk, the Battle of Chashniki, Smoliany and Borisov, pursuing the Grande Armée to the Berezina

=== German and French campaigns 1813–1814 ===
During the War of the Sixth Coalition, Rosen took part in the siege of Danzig and received the Order of Saint Vladimir 3rd class for the capture of Labiau. Assigned to the Army of the North, he commanded a brigade consisting of the Lithuanian, Podolsky and Nevsky Infantry Regiments. At the head of this brigade he fought at the Battle of Großbeeren on 11 August 1813 and the Battle of Dennewitz on 25 August 1813. At the Battle of Leipzig his brigade stood in reserve on the right wing on 6 October and participated in the storming of the city on 7 October. For his conduct and personal bravery he was promoted to major general, with seniority from 11 January 1814

In the French campaign of 1814 Rosen took part in the capture of Soissons, where he served briefly as temporary commandant, and at Reims, distinguishing himself at the Battle of Craonne and the Battle of Laon, for which he received the Order of Saint Anna 1st class. In early March his brigade marched via Châlons-sur-Marne and Meaux to Paris, where on 18 March 1814 — the day of the Battle of Paris — it stood in reserve along the Senlis road at Aubervilliers. He returned to Russia with his brigade in August 1814.

=== Later service and Sevastopol ===
On 25 December 1815 Rosen was appointed commander of the 3rd Brigade of the 14th Infantry Division in the I Infantry Corps. On 20 September 1821 he was placed on the army list without a post owing to ill-health, and lived in retirement at Reval for more than a decade.

He was recalled to active duty on 12 May 1832 and appointed commandant of Sevastopol, the principal base of the Black Sea Fleet. On 2 April 1833 he was promoted to lieutenant general, and on 9 January 1838 he was awarded the Order of St. Vladimir 2nd class for distinguished service. At his own request he was relieved of the commandancy of Sevastopol on 9 February 1842, while being retained on the army list. On 17 March 1845 he was promoted to general of infantry.

Rosen returned to his native Reval, where he died on 5 July 1851, a few days after his eighty-fourth birthday.

== Marriage and children ==
In 1800 Rosen married Elisabeth von Schwebs (1772–1841), an Estonian noblewoman and daughter of an Actual State Councillor; the couple had two children. Their son Fyodor Fyodorovich Rosen (1808–1854) entered the civil service, rose to the rank of Actual State Councillor, and served as chairman of the Committee on Foreign Settlers of the Southern Region of Russia. Rosen's grandsons included the mineralogist and Kazan University professor Friedrich von Rosen (1834–1902), the general of infantry Alexander von Rosen (1835–1921), and the lieutenant general Stepan von Rosen (1838–after 1912)

== Portrait in the Winter Palace ==
On 7 August 1820 the attestation committee of the Main Staff included Rosen in the list of generals "deserving to be depicted in the gallery", and on 15 February 1822 Emperor Alexander I ordered his portrait to be painted. The fee to George Dawe was paid on 1 July 1822, and the finished portrait entered the Hermitage on 7 September 1825. It is one of 332 portraits of Russian generals of the Patriotic War of 1812 displayed in the Military Gallery of the Winter Palace. Rosen is depicted in the general's Vizmundir introduced for infantry generals on 7 May 1817, wearing the star of the Order of St. Anna 1st class, the crosses of the Order of St. Vladimir 3rd class and the Prussian Pour le Mérite, the cross of the Order of St. George 4th class, and the silver medal "In Memory of the Patriotic War of 1812" on the Andreevsky ribbon together with the bronze noble medal of the same name on the Vladimir ribbon.

== Awards and decorations ==
- Order of St. George 4th class (1811)
- Order of Saint Vladimir 4th class (22 September 1802)
- Order of St. Vladimir 3rd class (for the capture of Labiau, 1813)
- Order of St. Vladimir 2nd class (9 January 1838)
- Order of Saint Anna 4th class on sword (25 May 1804)
- Order of St. Anna 1st class, later with diamonds (for Craonne and Laon, 1814)
- Knight of the Order of St. John of Jerusalem
- Prussian Pour le Mérite
- Silver medal "In Memory of the Patriotic War of 1812" on the Andreevsky ribbon
- Bronze noble medal "In Memory of the Patriotic War of 1812" on the Vladimir ribbon

== Summary of ranks ==
Date	Rank
1 January 1777	Private, Preobrazhensky Life Guards
c. 1779	Sergeant, Izmailovsky Life Guards
1 January 1789	Captain
23 December 1798	Major
6 December 1804	Lieutenant Colonel
12 December 1807	Colonel
11 January 1814	Major General
2 April 1833	Lieutenant General
17 March 1845	General of Infantry

== See also ==
- von Rosen family
- Military Gallery of the Winter Palace
- List of Russian commanders in the French invasion of Russia
