= Ivan Leontiev =

Imperial Russian general

Ivan Sergeyevich Leontiev
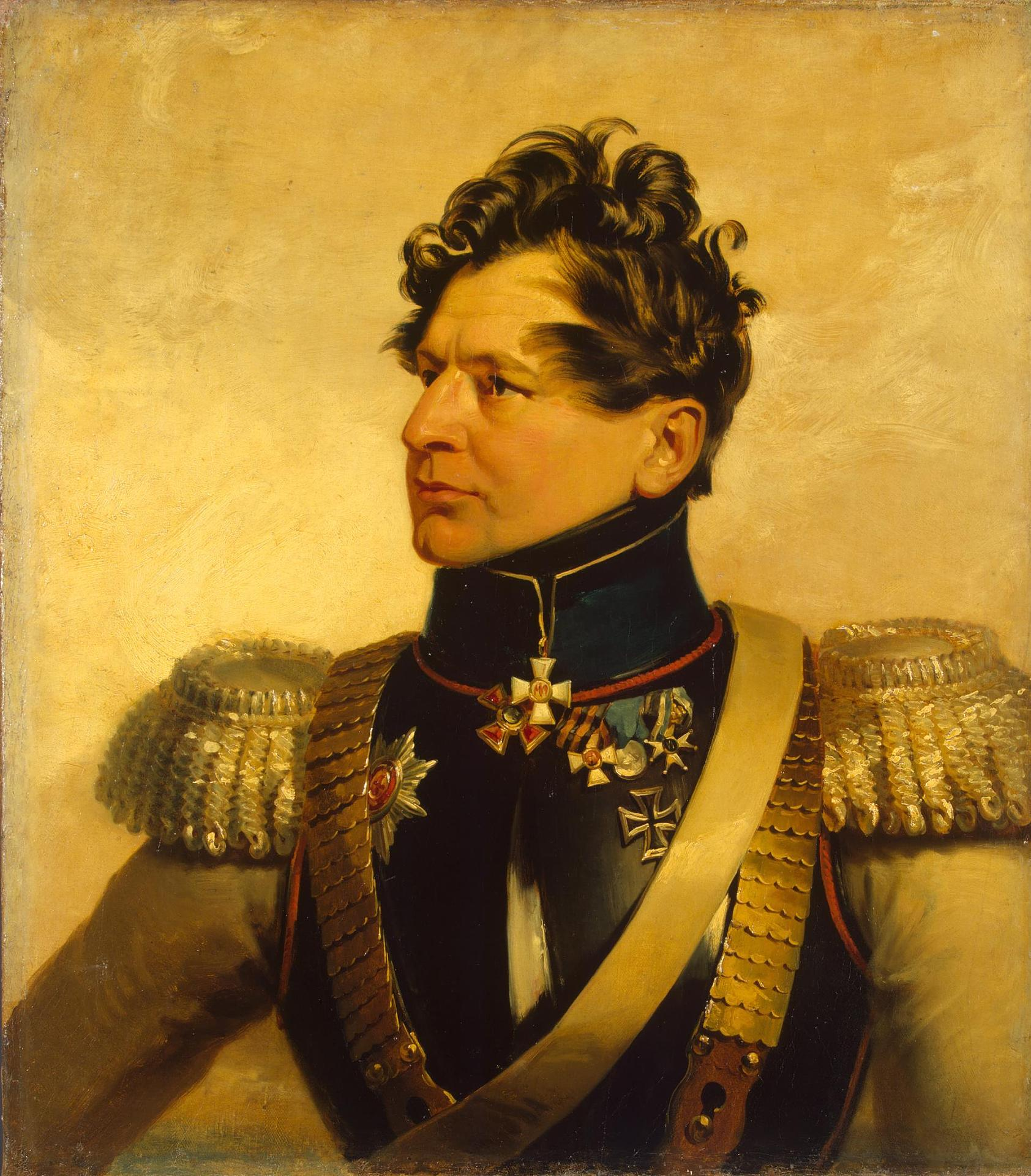
- Portrait by George Dawe
- Born: 2 March 1782
- Died: 2 August 1824 (aged 42) Penza, Russian Empire
- Allegiance: Russian Empire
- Branch: Army
- Service years: 1799–1824
- Rank: Major General
- Commands: 1st Brigade, 2nd Cuirassier Division
- Conflicts: War of the Third Coalition; Battle of Austerlitz; War of the Fourth Coalition; French invasion of Russia; Battle of Borodino; War of the Sixth Coalition
- Awards: Order of St. George; Order of the Red Eagle; Order of St. Vladimir; Order of Saint Anna; Military Order of Max Joseph; Kulm Cross; Gold Sword for Bravery

Ivan Sergeyevich Leontiev (2 March 1782–2 August 1824) was an Imperial Russian general who fought in the Napoleonic Wars. In December 1812 he was promoted to major general and made commander of the 1st Brigade of the 2nd Cuirassier Division under Baron Duka and fought at the battles of Lützen and Bautzen.

== See also ==
- List of Russian commanders in the Patriotic War of 1812
