= Battle of Polotsk =

Battle of Polotsk may refer to the following battles which took place during the Napoleon's invasion of Russia:

- First battle of Polotsk, 17–18 August 1812
- Second battle of Polotsk, 17–19 October 1812

== See also ==
- Siege of Polotsk (disambiguation)
