= Adam Georg von Agthe =

Imperial Russian Army officer

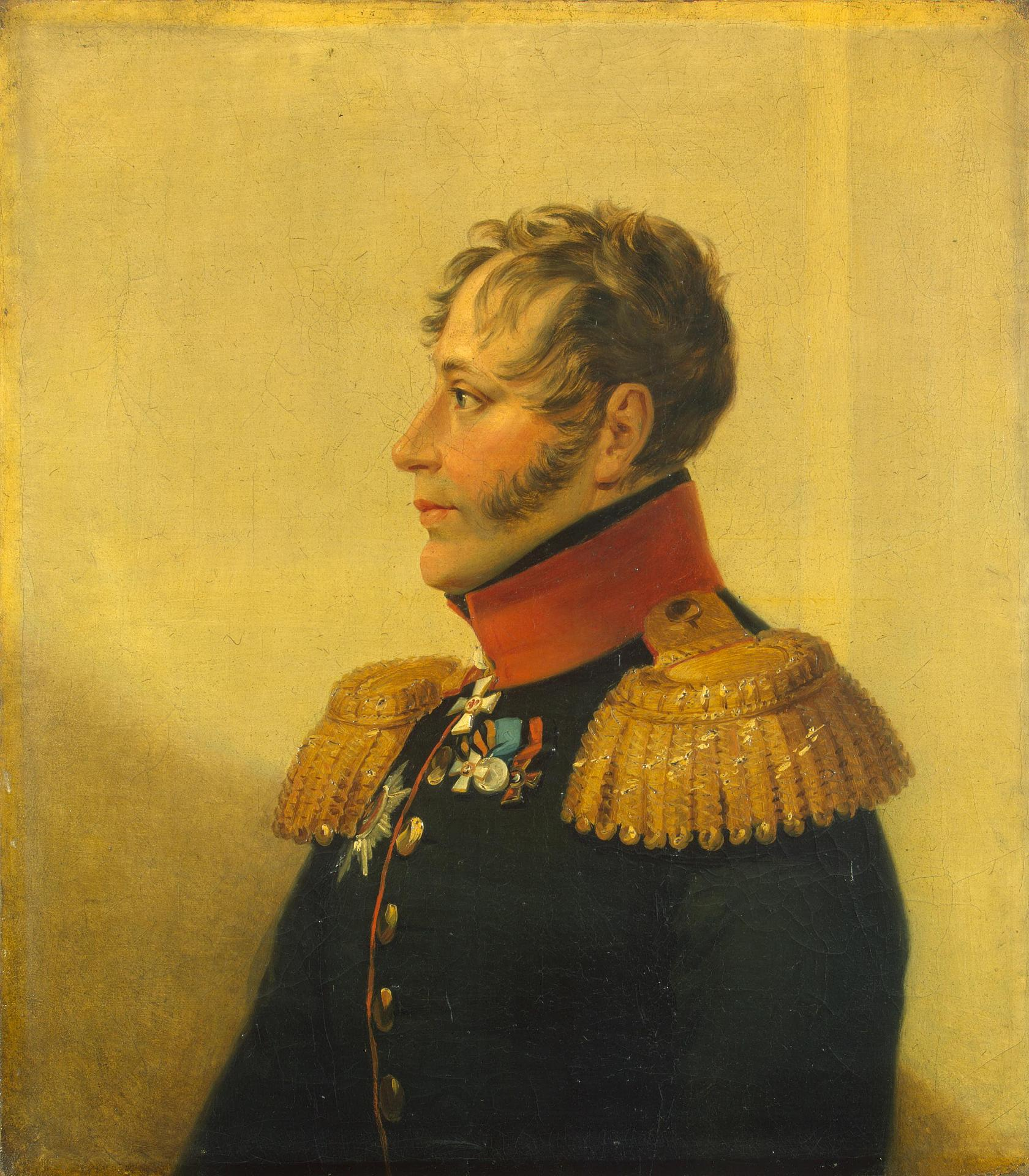
- Portrait by George Dawe in the Military Gallery of the Winter Palace, before 1828.
- Born: 12 August 1777; Ahrensburg, Governorate of Livonia, Russian Empire
- Died: 26 August 1826 (aged 49); Kremenchug, Russian Empire
- Other name: Egor Andreevich Akhte
- Military career
- Allegiance: Russia
- Branch: Imperial Russian Army
- Service years: 1796–1816
- Rank: Major general
- Conflicts: War of the Third Coalition; Battle of Dürenstein; Battle of Austerlitz; Russo-Turkish War (1806–1812); Battle of Batin; Patriotic War of 1812; Battle of Krasnoi; War of the Sixth Coalition; Battle of Lützen; Battle of Bautzen; Battle of Dresden; Battle of Kulm; Battle of Arcis-sur-Aube; Battle of Paris
- Awards: Order of Saint George; Order of Saint Anna; Order of Saint Vladimir; Pour le Mérite; Order of the Red Eagle

Adam Georg von Agthe (12 August 1777 – 26 August 1826) was a major general in the Imperial Russian Army during the Napoleonic Wars. He was also known by his Russian name Egor Andreevich Akhte (Russian: Егор Андреевич Ахте).

== Biography ==
He was born into a Baltic-German noble family. He was promoted to lieutenant in 1796. He fought at the battle of Austerlitz in 1805, receiving a medal for distinction, and fought in the Russo-Turkish War between 1806 and 1811. He was awarded the Order of St George 4th class on 10 March 1812 for the capture of Batina, and also fought at the battle of Borodino. He was promoted to major general after the battle of Leipzig in 1813, but was invalided out of the army on 15 April 1816 due to several injuries.

== See also ==
- List of Russian commanders in the French invasion of Russia
