= 2nd Pavlograd Life Hussar Regiment =

2nd Alexander III Pavlograd Life Hussar Regiment
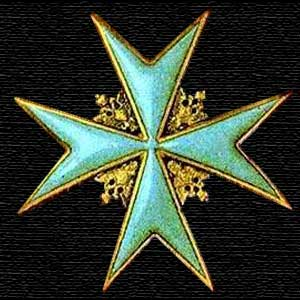
- Regimental badge from 1912
- Active: 1764–1918
- Country: Russian Empire
- Branch: Imperial Russian Army
- Type: Cavalry (Hussars)
- Size: 1,116 men (1812)
- Part of: 2nd Cavalry Division (1914)
- Garrison/HQ: Suwałki (1914)
- Patron: Alexander III
- Engagements: Italian and Swiss expedition; War of the Third Coalition; War of the Fourth Coalition; Austro-Polish War; War of the Sixth Coalition; Russo-Turkish War (1828–1829); November Uprising; Hungarian Revolution of 1848; Crimean War; January Uprising; World War I

Commanders
- Notable commanders: Yefim Chaplits; Spiridon Zhevakhov

The 2nd Pavlograd Life Hussar Regiment (Russian: 2-й лейб-гусарский Павлоградский полк) was a cavalry regiment of the Imperial Russian Army.

The regiment was originally formed in 1783 as the Pavlograd Light Horse Regiment from the Dnepr and Yekaterinoslav Regiments of Pikemen, although it traced its seniority back to the establishment of both regiments in 1764. It became the Pavlograd Hussar Regiment in 1801, and fought in the Napoleonic Wars, distinguishing itself at the Battle of Schöngrabern during the War of the Third Coalition. The regiment also fought at Austerlitz, Eylau, and Friedland, but served in a secondary theatre during the French invasion of Russia, although it fought in the Battle of Berezina in the latter. Subsequently, it took part in the Russian campaign in Europe, fighting at Leipzig, Craonne and Saint-Dizier.

The regiment went on to fight in the Russo-Turkish War of 1828–1829, the November Uprising, the Hungarian Revolution of 1848, the Crimean War, and the January Uprising.

== Origins ==
The Pavlograd Hussar Regiment was originally formed on 28 June 1783 from the Dnepr and Yekaterinoslav Regiments of Pikemen as the Pavlograd Light Horse Regiment, with six squadrons. Both of the Regiments of Pikemen had been established on 9 July 1764, which was celebrated as the regimental day. The Dnepr Regiment of Pikemen fought in the Russo-Turkish War of 1768–1774 from 1769, participating in the final assault of the siege of Bender on 16 September 1770 and the campaign of Pyotr Rumyantsev on the right bank of the Danube in 1771. The Yekaterinoslav Regiment of Pikemen was formed as the Donetsk Regiment of Pikemen and fought in the Russo-Turkish War. On 29 November 1796 it was named after its chef, Brigadier Karl Bour, who was promoted to major general on 27 January 1797 and to lieutenant general on 6 September 1798, as a result of Paul I's reorganization of the regiments.

== Napoleonic Wars ==
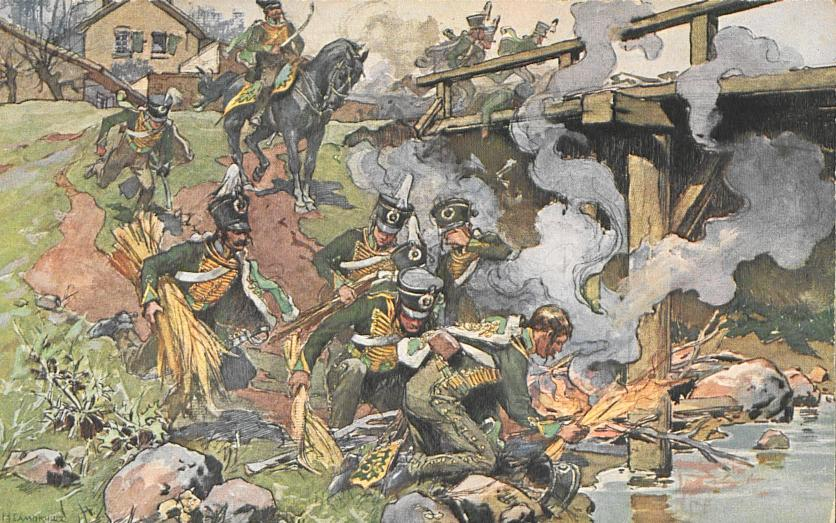
c. 1912 postcard depicting Pavlograd Hussars setting fire to a bridge in 1812

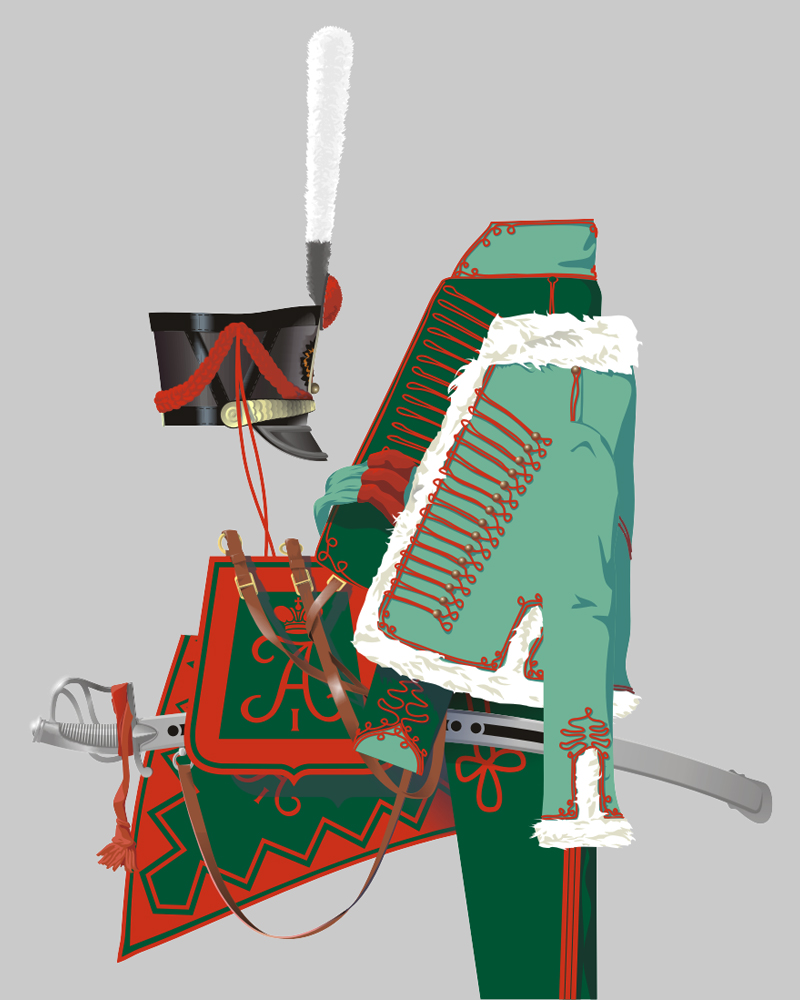
Uniform of a trooper of the regiment in 1812

The regiment fought in the Swiss expedition in 1799 during the War of the Second Coalition, with Army of Condé. On 26 September of that year the regiment fought in the repulse of the French attack on Constance. On 31 March 1801, the regiment was redesignated as the Pavlograd Hussar Regiment, with five squadrons, when Alexander I restored the previous naming of regiments.

During the 1805 War of the Third Coalition, the regiment formed part of Pyotr Bagration's column. On 27 September it reached Braunau, before fighting in the Battle of Lambach, the Battle of Amstetten, and the Battle of Schöngrabern during the retreat of Kutuzov from Krems to Znaim, distinguishing itself in the latter two. For its actions at Schöngrabern, the regiment was granted one white and nine green St. George standards on 13 June 1806. It fought on the right flank at the Battle of Austerlitz, covering Bagration's retreat.

Bour was replaced by Major General Yefim Chaplits on 23 July 1806, who was later promoted to lieutenant general on 31 October 1812. The Pavlograd Hussars subsequently fought in the Battle of Czarnowo, the Battle of Ostrołęka, the Battle of Golymin, the Battle of Eylau, the Battle of Heilsberg, and the Battle of Friedland during the 1806–1807 War of the Fourth Coalition, and in the advance into Galicia during the Austro-Polish War of 1809.

From 1810 to 1814 Colonel Spiridon Zhevakhov served as regimental commander; he was promoted to Major General on 15 September 1813.

At the beginning of the 1812 French invasion of Russia, the active squadrons of the regiment, numbering 1,116 men, were part of the Sergei Kamensky's corps in the Third Reserve Army of Observation, positioned in Volhynia. The reserve squadrons, formed in the Novgorod-Seversky Recruitment Depot, were planned to form part of the 14th Cavalry Division, but were instead used as replacements. The Pavlograd Hussars fought in the Battle of Kobrin and the Battle of Gorodechno, suffering casualties of eighteen men in the latter. At the end of September, the regiment's eight squadrons numbered 939 men. Subsequently, as part of Chaplits' detachment, the regiment distinguished itself in the Slonim affair and fought in the Battle of Berezina. On 27 December, when the Russian cavalry were reorganized, the Pavlograd Hussars became part of the 3rd Hussar Division, with six active and one reserve squadrons.

During the 1813 campaign in Saxony, the regiment fought in the Siege of Toruń, the Battle of Großbeeren, the Battle of Dennewitz, and the Battle of Leipzig. It fought at the Battle of Craonne and the Battle of Saint-Dizier during the 1814 Campaign in north-east France. On 19 November 1814, for their actions between 1812 and 1814, the Pavlograd Hussars were awarded shako badges for distinction.

== 1815 to 1918 ==
The Pavlograd Hussars fought in the Russo-Turkish War of 1828–1829, besieging Silistra and fighting in the Battle of Kulevicha. After marching through the Balkans it fought in the Battle of Sliven. The regiment participated in the suppression of the Polish November Uprising in 1831 at Minsk and Stanisławów. It gained two more active squadrons when a battalion of the abolished Pereyaslavl Horse Jaeger Regiment was merged into the regiment on 21 March 1833. On 1 April 1838, then-Tsesarevich Alexander Nikolayevich became ceremonial chef of the regiment, and it was accordingly redesignated as His Imperial Highness the Heir Tsesarevich's Hussar Regiment.

To suppress the Hungarian Revolution of 1848, the regiment was sent to Hungary as part of the detachment of General Mikhail Cheodayev. It fought in the battles at Geremboli and Felsh-Zoltsa on 12 and 13 July, and participated in the occupation of Tokaj. During the Crimean War, the regiment fought in actions at Giurgiu and Slobozia in the initial occupation of the Danubian Principalities. On 19 February 1856, after Alexander Nikolayevich took the throne as Alexander II, the regiment was renamed as His Majesty's Life Hussar Regiment, and on 19 March 1857 it returned to the Pavlograd designation. It was reorganized with four active and two reserve squadrons on 14 May 1860. The 6th squadron was abolished in 1863, while the 5th squadron transferred to the reserve and separated from the regiment. In the same year it fought in the suppression of the Polish January Uprising, participating in fighting in what became Łomża Governorate. On 25 March 1864 it was numbered as the 2nd His Majesty's Pavlograd Life Hussar Regiment. In honor of its centenary, the regiment received a new St. George standard on 9 July, with the added inscription 1764–1864 and Alexander jubilee ribbon.

Grand Duke Tsesarevich Alexander Alexandrovich (later Alexander III) became second chef of the regiment on 26 February 1874. It was redesignated as a dragoon regiment and renumbered as the 6th on 18 August 1882. After the death of Alexander III, the regiment was named in honor of him on 2 November 1894, being redesignated as the 6th Imperator Alexander III Pavlograd Life Dragoon Regiment. The regiment became a hussar unit numbered 2nd again on 6 December 1907. Emperor Nicholas II appointed himself chef of the regiment on 14 May 1911. It was dissolved in early 1918.

== In popular culture ==
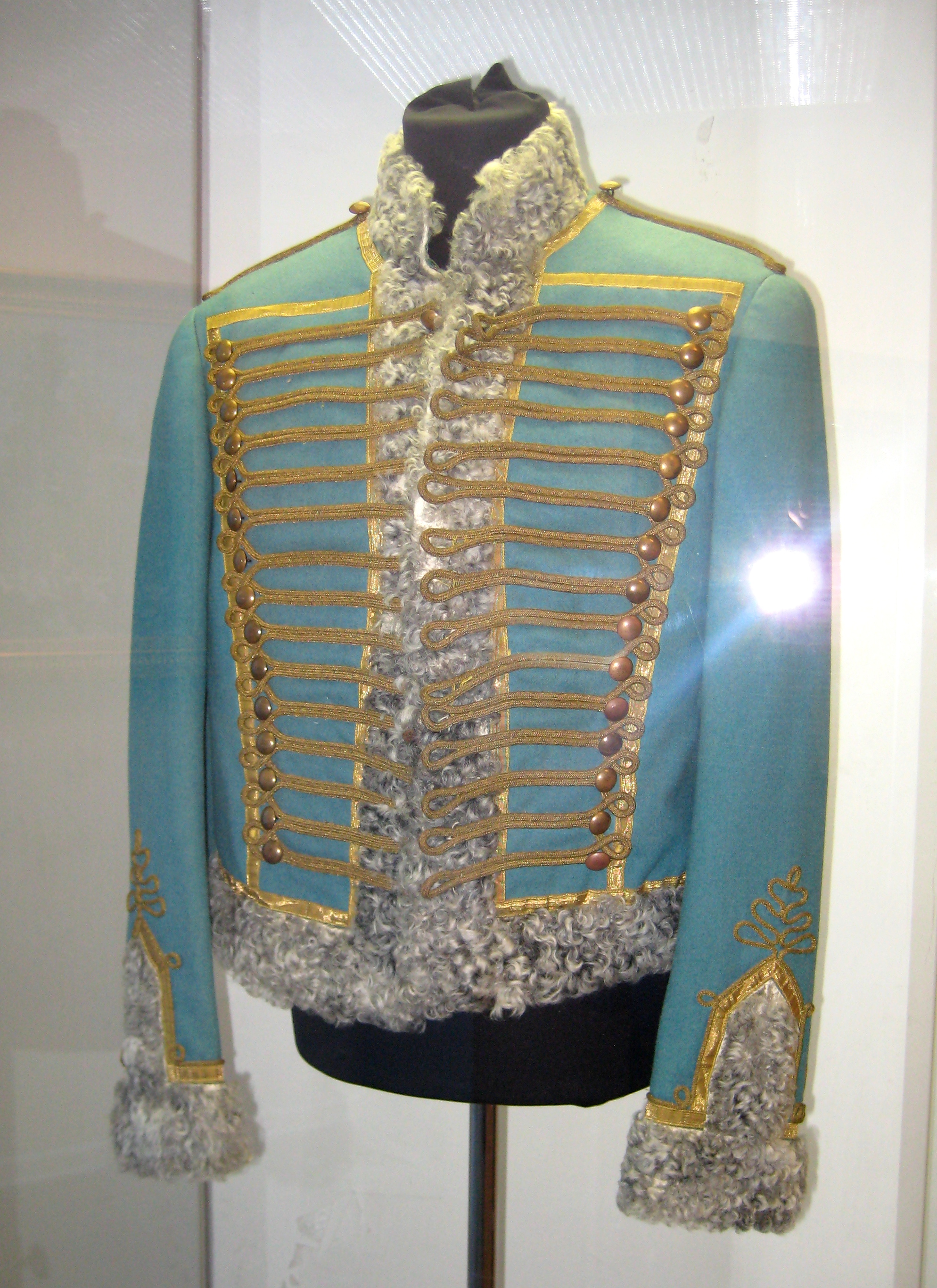
Uniform worn by actor playing Vasily Denisov in the War and Peace film series

In Leo Tolstoy's novel War and Peace characters Nikolai Rostov and Vasily Denisov are depicted as officers in the regiment. For narrative purposes, Tolstoy depicted the regiment as fighting in the Battle of Ostrovno, which it did not participate in.
