= Anton Skalon =

Russian commander (1767–1812)

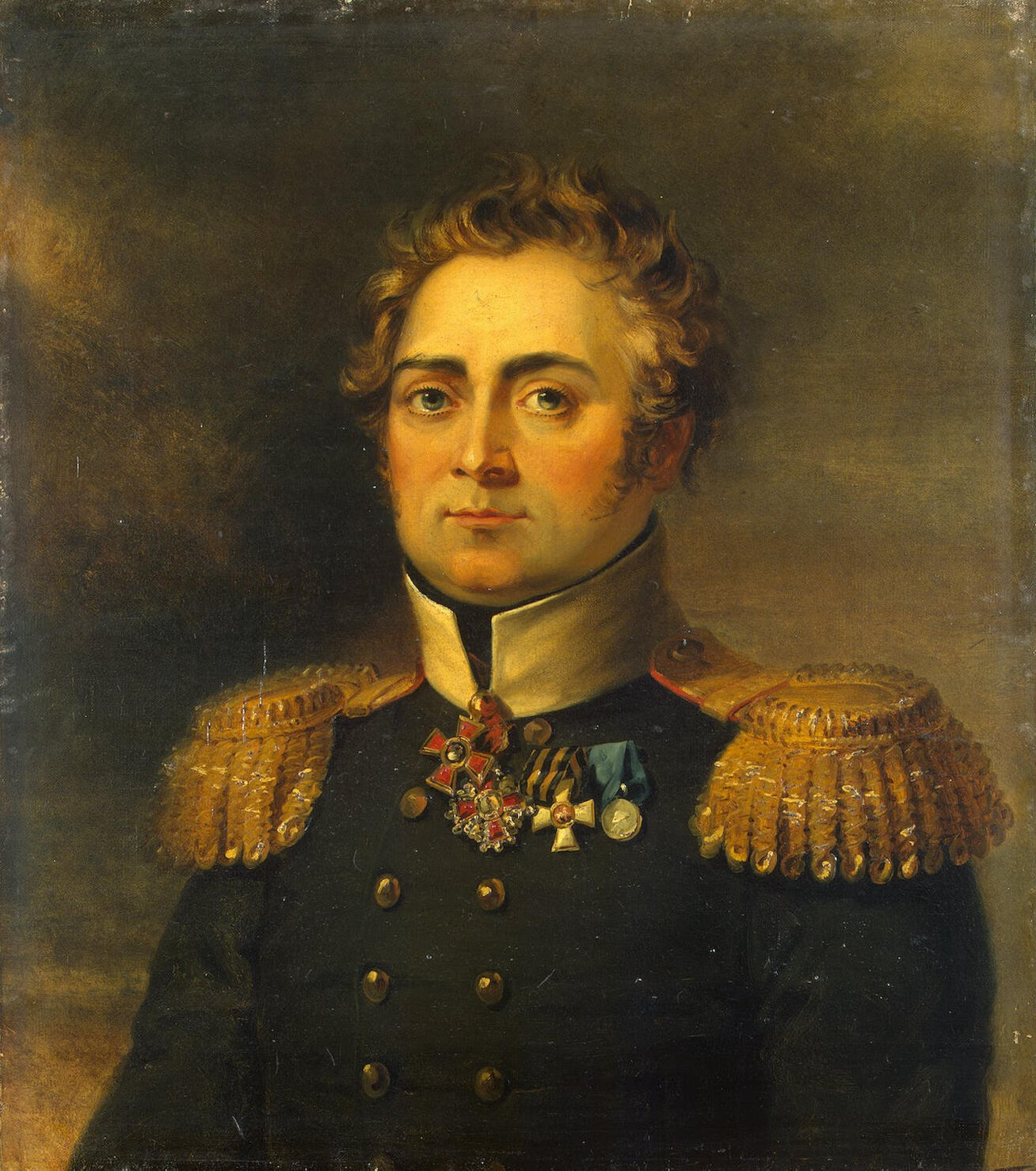
Portrait by George Dawe

Anton Antonovich Skalon (Russian - Антон Антонович Скалон; 6 September 1767, in Biysk fortress – 1812) was a Russian commander during the Napoleonic Wars, rising to the rank of major general in the Imperial Russian Army.

== Early life and ancestry ==
Anton was born as the son of Georg Anton de Skalon (1720-1777), Lieutenant general in the Russian Imperial Army and his first wife, Karoline von Oettingen. He was a descendant of the French Huguenot George de Skalon, whose sons Stepan and Daniel had moved to Russia in 1710.

== Career and death ==
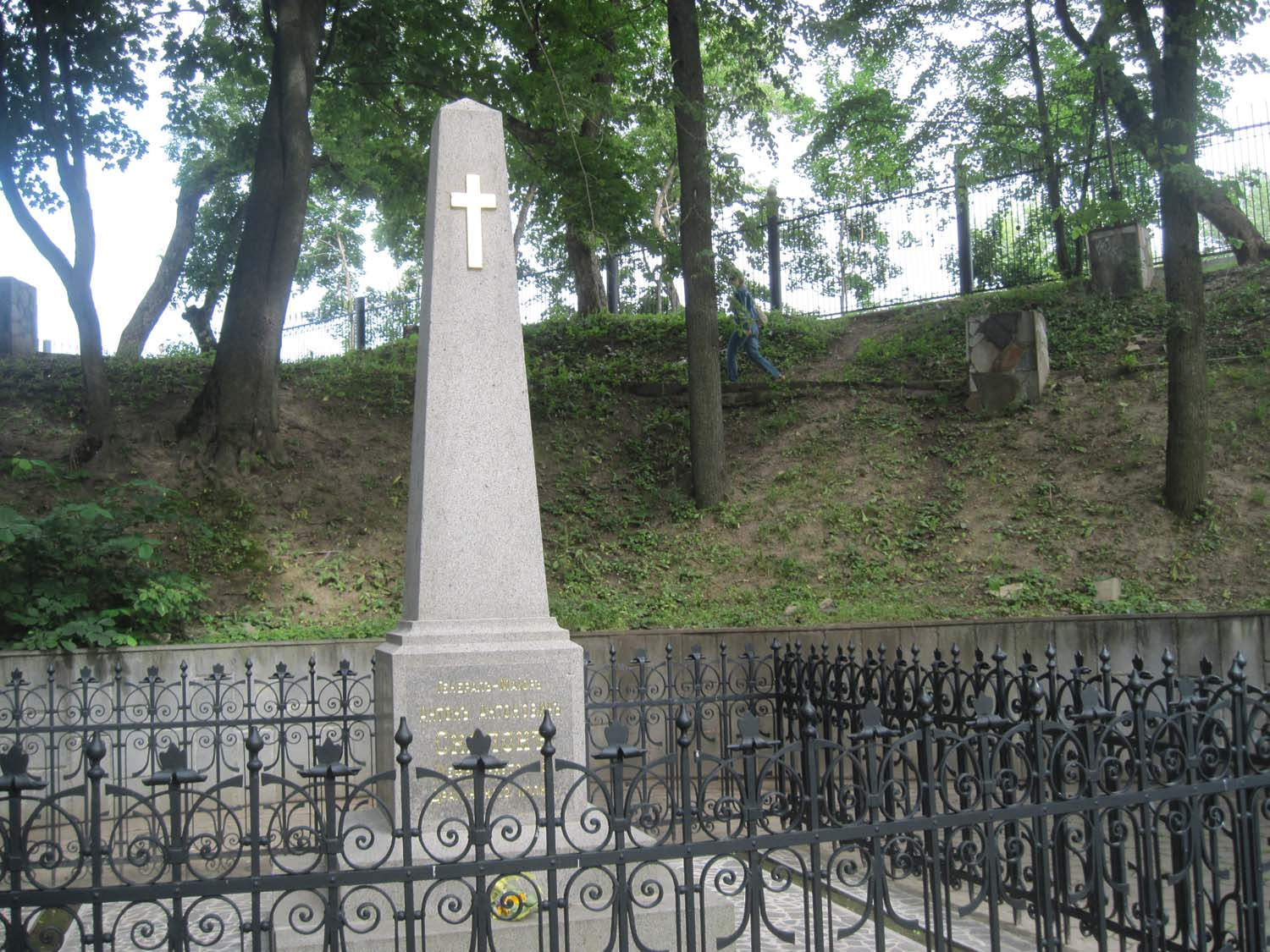
Monument to Skalon

He and his regiment of dragoons, combined with a detachment of cossacks, were in the Rachenskoe suburb. On 5 August 1812, aiming to prevent the French attack, Skalon attacked quickly, but was killed on the spot in the Battle of Smolensk, which pushed his force into retreat. His body fell into enemy hands and at Napoleon's personal command it was buried with full military honours three days after the French occupation of Smolensk.
