= Filipp Zhevakhov =

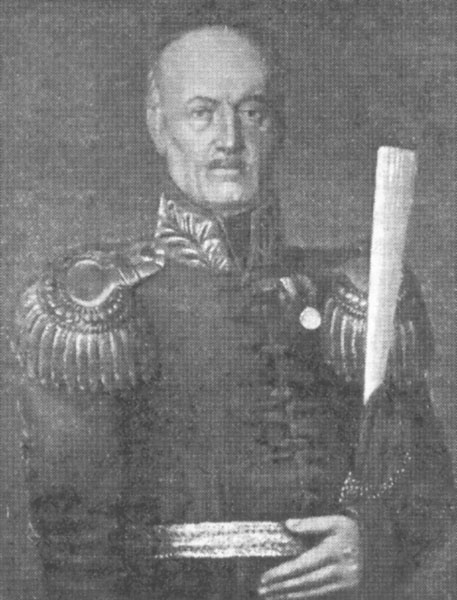

Filipp Semyonovich Zhevakhov (Russian: Филипп Семенович Жевахов) (1752 – c. 1817) was a Georgian nobleman and a general of the Imperial Russian Army noted for his participation in the Napoleonic Wars. He was the brother of General Ivan Zhevakhov.

Zhevakhov was born in the émigré Georgian family of Princes Javakhishvili who had an estate in Ukraine. Filipp's branch of the Javakhishvili family originally moved out of Georgia to Russia in the 1730s at the invitation of the exiled Georgian monarch Vakhtang VI.

Filipp joined the Russian army as a hussar officer in 1766 and took part in the wars against the Ottoman Empire. He retired as a major-general in 1801, but temporarily returned to a military service to lead a volunteer militia from the Poltava Governorate during the war with Napoleonic France in the years 1812–1814.
