= Ivan Vasilievich Argamakov =

Ivan

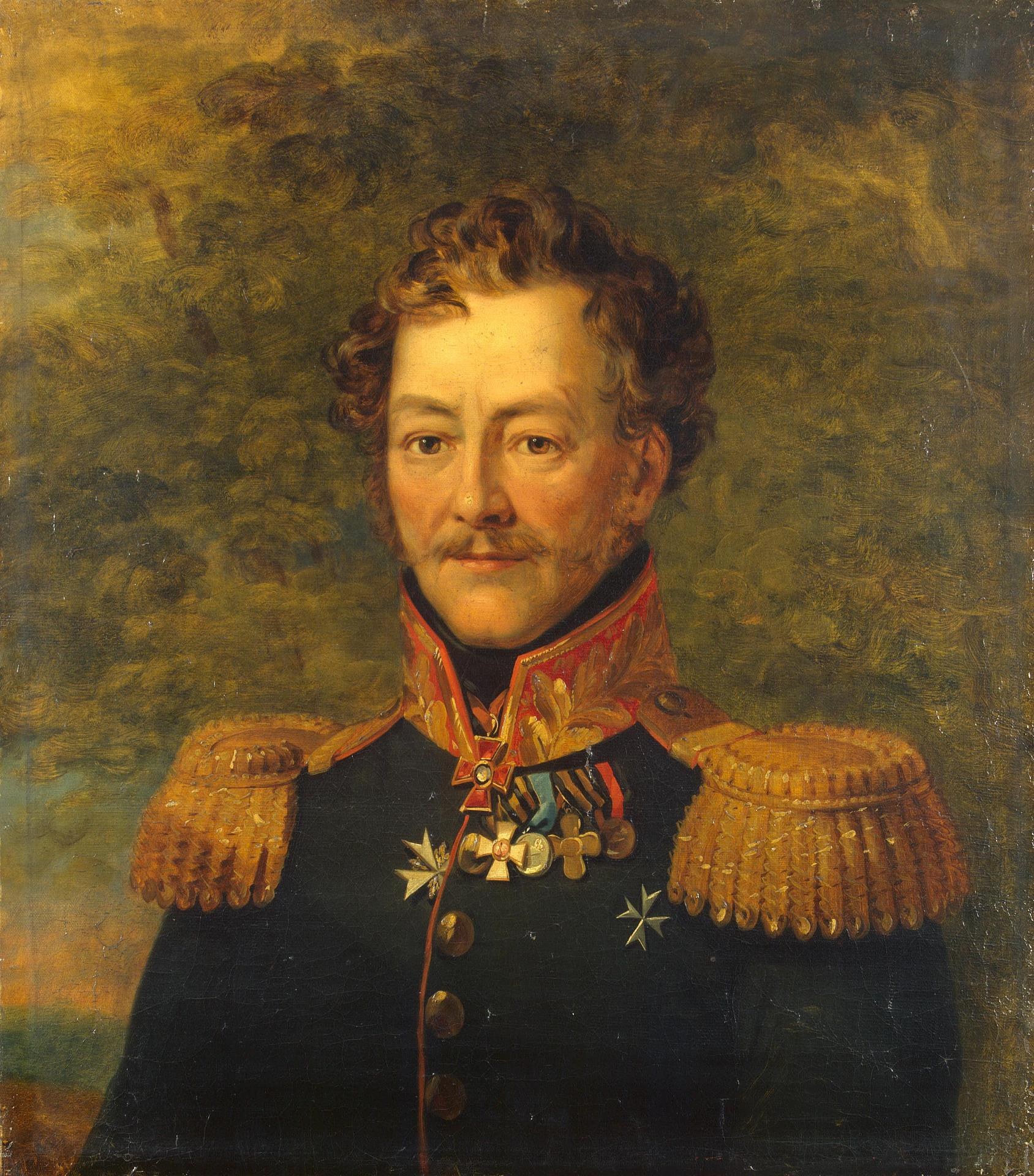
Portrait of Argamakov by George Dawe (Military Gallery of the Winter Palace)

Ivan Vasilievich Argamakov (Russian: Иван Васильевич Аргамаков; 1763 – 1834) was a commander of the Imperial Russian Army during the Napoleonic Wars. His final rank was major general, to which he was promoted in 1815.
