= Nikanor Svechin =

Russian general

Nikanor Mikhailovich Svechin
- Никанор Михайлович Свечин
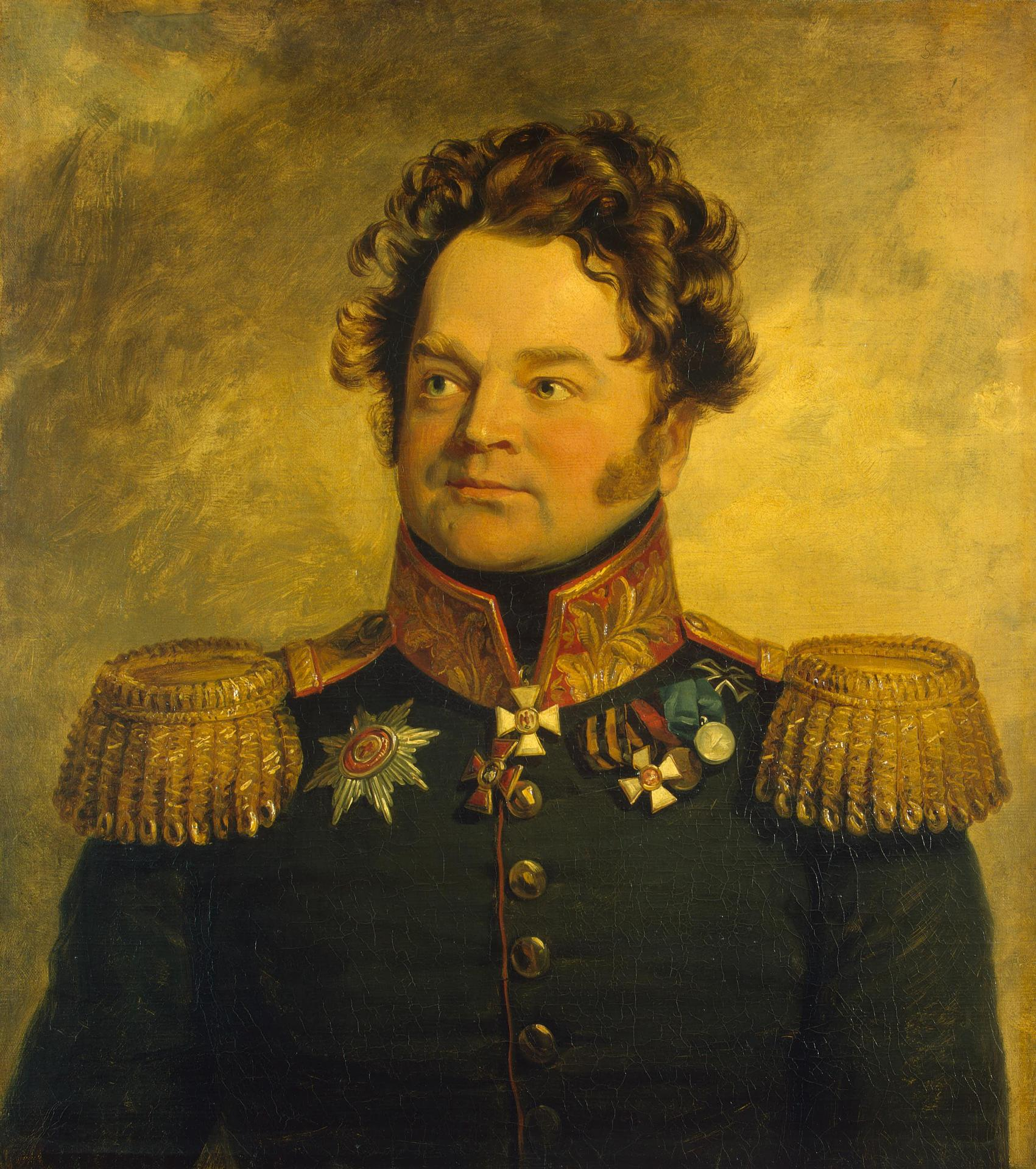
- Portrait of Nikanor Svechin by George Dawe Workshop. Military Gallery of the Winter Palace, State Hermitage (Saint Petersburg)
- Born: July 3, 1772
- Died: February 13, 1849 (aged 76); Saint Petersburg, Russian Empire
- Military career
- Allegiance: Russian Empire
- Branch: Infantry
- Rank: Lieutenant General
- Commands: 2nd Brigade, 12th Infantry Division; 2nd Brigade, 11th Infantry Division; 2nd Infantry Division; 10th Infantry Division
- Conflicts: War of the Third Coalition; Patriotic War of 1812; War of the Sixth Coalition; Russo-Turkish War (1828–1829)
- Awards: Orders: Order of Saint Anna, 2nd Degree (1812); Order of Saint Vladimir, 3rd Degree (1813); Order of Saint George, 4th Degree (1813); Kulm Cross (1813); Order of Saint Anna, 1st Degree (1814)

Nikanor Mikhailovich Svechin (1772–1849) was a Russian general, a participant in the Napoleonic Wars.

== Biography ==
A nobleman of the Tver Province, was born on July 3, 1772, in the family estate, the village of Dubrovka, Novotorzhsky District, and received his upbringing and education first at home, and then at the Tver Noble School.

He entered military service on January 22, 1791, as an ensign in the Life Guards Preobrazhensky Regiment; on December 14, 1798, he was promoted to ensign.

In the fall of 1805, already in the rank of lieutenant, he took part in the ranks of the regiment on a campaign in Moravia and an accident deprived him of the opportunity to take part in the Battle of Austerlitz. On the eve of the entry of the guard into Olmutz (November 10), at night, riding on a bridge across the river, due to the lack of a railing, he stumbled, fell with his horse on the ice, breaking it, and was pulled out unconscious by the Cossacks. The consequence of this fall was a severe dislocation of his right arm, which forced him to a long treatment in the regimental infirmary.

Subsequent peaceful service of Svechin was associated with his business trip in 1806 to Vilna to train the recruits of the reserve army and with the stay (from 1807 to 1810) as part of the 2nd Battalion of the regiment in Finland, near the city of Wasa.

Promoted to colonel in 1810, soon after that he was appointed commander of the 2nd Battalion of the Preobrazhensky Life Guards Regiment, and at the beginning of 1812, he set out with the regiment on a campaign to Sventsiany, where the guard became part of the 5th Infantry Corps of the 1st Western Army. In the battle at Borodino, the Preobrazhensky Regiment did not have to take direct part, since it was in reserve. For the courage shown in this battle, Svechin was awarded the Order of Saint Anna, 2nd Degree.

The Campaign of 1813 brought him fame not only among his fellow soldiers, but also among the entire guard. On April 20 and May 8 and 9, he took part in the battles of Lützen and Bautzen, and for Lützen he was awarded the Order of Saint Vladimir, 3rd Degree.

He also took part in a battle in front of Gisgübel and Kulm. On the night of August 15–16, Count Osterman, at whose disposal, among other troops, was the 1st Guards Infantry Division, received an order from the commander–in–chief to move with the troops entrusted to him to join the main army, to the city of Teplitz. According to the disposition sent to him, Count Osterman was supposed to go through the village of Maxen, which lay aside from the direct direction to Teplitz. But, realizing that by this movement he opens the way for the enemy in Teplitz, Osterman decided to violate the order and try to break through in a direct direction to Teplitz. The path of his advance lay through the village of Gisgübel, located between Pirna and Peterswald. As soon as the vanguard approached Gisgübel, it was met with artillery and rifle fire from the French, who wanted to stop its advance. At the head of the avant–garde was the Preobrazhensky Life Guards Regiment. Immediately, the regiment was stopped and Svechin, with the battalion entrusted to him, was ordered to overturn the French. Preobrazhentsy quickly rushed forward, hit with bayonets and overturned the enemy. The attack of the 2nd Battalion was so swift that in the tail of the column they did not notice that the warheads were in action. Count Osterman, watching Svechin's attack, applauded him, exclaiming: "Bravo!", and then turned to him with the words: "I have never seen such a brilliant attack", and presented the lower ranks of the 2nd Battalion with 150 ducats.

After this attack, the French were forced to clear the way for the troops, and Osterman's detachment, continuing on its way to Teplitz, approached Kulm on August 17. Here the guards had to fight the troops of Vandamme, sent to Teplitz. Possessing excellent forces, Vandamme was confident of victory, but to his surprise he met such a courageous rebuff from the guards that he was forced to stop his offensive. On this memorable day, Preobrazhentsy had to spend 10 hours continuously in the hottest battle, engaging in the attack several times. At the most critical moment of the battle, when two French columns attacked the left flank, the 1st and 2nd Battalions of Preobrazhentsy were advanced to meet them, and the Guards Lancers and Life Guards Izmailovsky Regiment were sent to the enemy's flanks. These units quickly rushed into the attack and defeated the French. At this time, an enemy cannonball tore off Count Osterman's left arm. Svechin and several grenadiers removed him from the horse and carried him to the dressing site. Thus, despite the efforts of the French, their troops were repulsed at all points and the battlefield remained in their control. On the next day (August 18), reinforced by the arriving reinforcements, their troops forced Vandamme's corps to lay down weapons. For the dashing attack at Gisgübel, Svechin was awarded on December 10, 1813, the Order of Saint George, 4th Degree (No. 2749 according to the list of Grigorovich – Stepanov), and for Kulm he was promoted to major general and awarded the Prussian Sign of the Iron Cross. In addition, he was honored to receive gratitude from the lips of Emperor Alexander I, Austrian Emperor Franz and King of Prussia Friedrich Wilhelm.

On September 28 of the same year, Svechin was appointed chief of the Newlingermanland Infantry Regiment (12th Division), which was part of the Polish Army of General Bennigsen. But before going to his regiment, he had to take part in the Battle of Leipzig, and he was awarded the Order of the Red Eagle, 2nd Degree by the Prussian King.

Further military service of Svechin fully justified his reputation as a brave and skillful general. Upon arrival to the regiment, he had to take part in the blockade of the Belfort Fortress (as part of the detachment of Count Orurk) at the very beginning, which lasted from December 10 to January 16 of the following year. Then, on 23 February, he took part in a heated battle of Craonne, and on 25 and 26 February in the battle at Laon. Here, commanding a brigade, as part of the Aleksopol and Novoingermanland Regiments, he particularly distinguished himself in the defense of the villages of Semily and Klassi, for which he was awarded the Order of Saint Anna, 1st Degree. On March 18, during the storming of Paris, he was in reserve with the regiment entrusted to him. On September 1 of the same year (due to the cancellation of the posts of regimental chiefs) Svechin was appointed commander of the 2nd Brigade of the 12th Infantry Division (5th Corps) and, after a two–year overseas campaign, brought her back to Russia.

On September 17, 1815, Svechin was enlisted in the army, and on November 25 of the same year, he was appointed commander of the 2nd Brigade of the 11th Infantry Division, which he commanded for six years. Then appointed commander of the 2nd Infantry Division (from April 28, 1822), and then the head of the 10th Infantry Division (February 1, 1823), he was promoted to lieutenant general on August 22, 1826, for his distinction in service.

In 1828, after the declaration of war on Turkey, Svechin with the division entrusted to him was demanded to the theater of operations. The 10th Infantry Division (Smolensk, Mogilev, Vitebsk and Polotsk Infantry and the 19th and 20th Jaeger Regiments) became part of the 3rd Infantry Corps and was sent to the Danube. After crossing this river, the division entrusted to him participated in the capture of the fortresses of Kyustendzhe and Mangalia. Then for some time Svechin took part in the blockade of Shumla, and then during the siege and surrender of the fortress of Varna.

After that, due to poor health, he was dismissed on leave to Russia, with enrollment in the army, and on February 13, 1829, he was dismissed, upon request, to resign. He died on February 13, 1849, in Saint Petersburg.

== Family ==
Wife (married January 21, 1817) – Ekaterina Engelhardt (May 17, 1798 – December 17, 1818), the legalized daughter of Vasily Engelhardt, the grand-niece of Prince Potemkin. They got married in Saint Petersburg in the Simeon Church. They had son Nikanor (December 9, 1818 – ?; godson of Princess Tatyana Yusupova) and daughter Maria, was married to Prince Nikolai Obolensky. Svechin's grandson was Prince Nikolai Obolensky, Adjutant General.

== Sources ==
- Svechin, Nikanor Mikhailovich // Russian Biographical Dictionary: in 25 Volumes – Saint Petersburg – Moscow, 1896–1918
- Dictionary of Russian Generals, Participants in the Hostilities Against the Army of Napoleon Bonaparte in 1812–1815 // Russian Archive. History of the Fatherland in the Evidence and Documents of the 18th–20th Centuries: Collection – Moscow: Studio "Trite", Nikita Mikhalkov, 1996 – Volume 7 – Page 550 – ISSN 0869-20011 – (Comments by Alexander Podmazo)
