= Javakhishvili =

Coat of arms of Princes Jevahov

The House of Javakhishvili (Georgian: ჯავახიშვილი) is a Russian noble family of Georgian origin, which was a branch of the Toreli (თორელი), known from the 10th century.

== History ==
The surname Javakhishvili, literally "son of Javakh", derives from the 14th-century nobleman Javakh (known as Svimon in priesthood), a participant of Georgia's resistance to Timur’s attacks. Javakh and his household resettled from Javakheti to Inner Kartli, and received from the Crown a series of villages in hereditary possession. After the fragmentation of the Kingdom of Georgia in the 15th century, the Javakhishvili estates fell under the suzerainty of the Kings of Kartli, but the family was able to transform their possessions into a semi-autonomous seigniory (satavado) known as Sajavakhishvilo (საჯავახიშვილო). They held various political and religious posts within the Kingdom of Kartli, but declined in their influence after Russian annexation of Georgia in 1801. A branch of this family, in the person of Shiosh (Simon) Javakhishvili, had emigrated in Russia in the 1720s, and was eventually received among the princely families of Russia as knyaz Zhevakhov (Russian: Жеваховы). The senior Georgian line of the Javakhishvili were confirmed as a princely house of Dzhavakhov (Джаваховы) by the Russian Senate in 1850.

== Notable members ==
- Ivan Zhevakhov, Russian general
- Spiridon Zhevakhov, Russian general
- Ivane Javakhishvili, Georgian historian and linguist
- Sandro Javakhishvili, Georgian geographer
- Piruz Javakhishvili, Georgian Winemaker and Oenologist
