= Joseph Galatte =

Italian commander in the Imperial Russian Army

- Иосиф Николаевич Галатте;
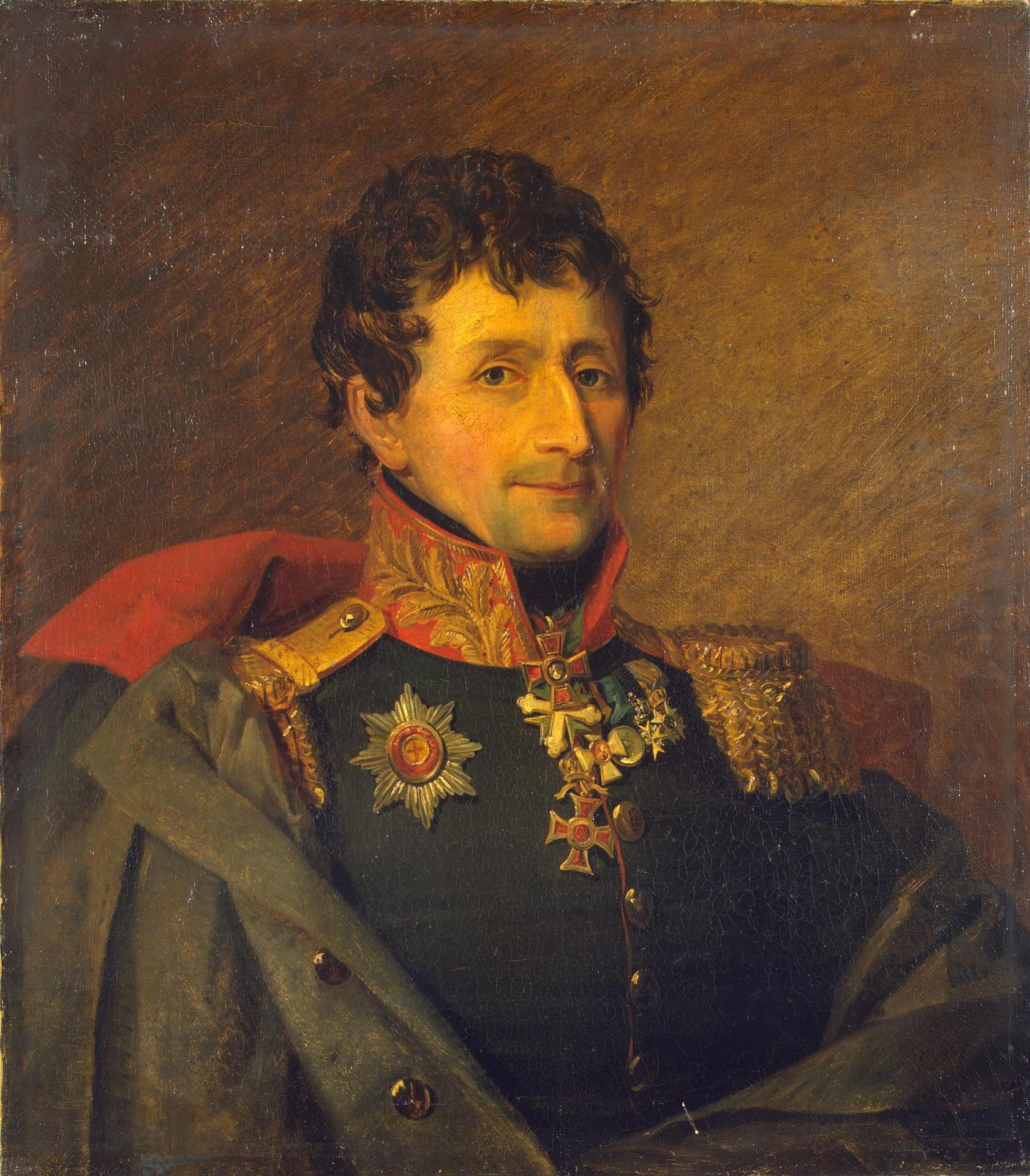
- Portrait of Galatte by George Dawe
- Born: Piedmont
- Military career
- Allegiance: Russia
- Branch: Infantry
- Service years: 1799
- Conflicts: Second Archipelago Expedition; Napoleonic Wars; Battle of Dennewitz; Battle of Leipzig; Battle of Saint-Dizier
- Awards: Order of Saint George 4th class Order of St Vladimir 3rd class Order of Saint Anna; Order of St. Maurice and Lazarus 2nd class Order of Leopold 2nd class Medal In memory of 1812 year war Knights cross of the order of Malta; Order of the Sword 4th class

Joseph Nikolajevič Galatte (Russian: Иосиф Николаевич Галатте; 1760 - 1816) was an Italian-born commander in the Imperial Russian Army during the Napoleonic Wars.

== Life ==
Born into a Piedmontese noble family, he initially joined the Sardinian army, before transferring to the Russian army on 12 July 1799. He took part in the campaigns against the French in Italy and Switzerland in 1799 and in Bohemia and Moravia in 1805. On 30 January 1806 he was promoted to lieutenant colonel and on 26 May the same year was appointed to the retinue of His Imperial Majesty's Quartermaster.

He took part in the Second Archipelago Expedition into the Mediterranean under Vice Admiral Dmitry Senyavin in the Mediterranean, particularly the capture of the island of Tenedos, for which he was awarded the Order of Saint George 4th class on 9 September 1807. and was, in particular, in the capture of the island of Tenedos, for that on September 9, 1807, she was awarded the Order of St. George 4th class - the citation read:

As a reward for great courage and bravery, rendered in battle with a Turkish squadron on 19 June where, whilst on board the ship Сильном, spent the whole battle on the quarterdeck, noticed the enemy squadron's movement and gave a good example of courage and presence of mind to encourage people to vigour.

He became a major in Sveaborg on 6 September 1810, and colonel on 20 November the same year. He volunteered for the 1812 campaign and the advance across Germany, winning the Order of St Vladimir 3rd class for his conduct at the battle of Dennewitz and a gold sword with diamonds for that at Leipzig. He was promoted to major general on 15 December 1813, and was granted the Order of Saint Anna 1st class for his conduct at the battle of Saint-Dizier. He was dismissed from the army on 5 April 1816, but allowed to retain his uniform.

== Sources ==
- Mikaberidze, A. (2005). Russian Officer Corps of the Revolutionary and Napoleonic Wars. Historia (E-libro). Savas Beatie. ISBN 978-1-61121-002-6.
