= Gotthard August von Helffreich =

Baltic German commander

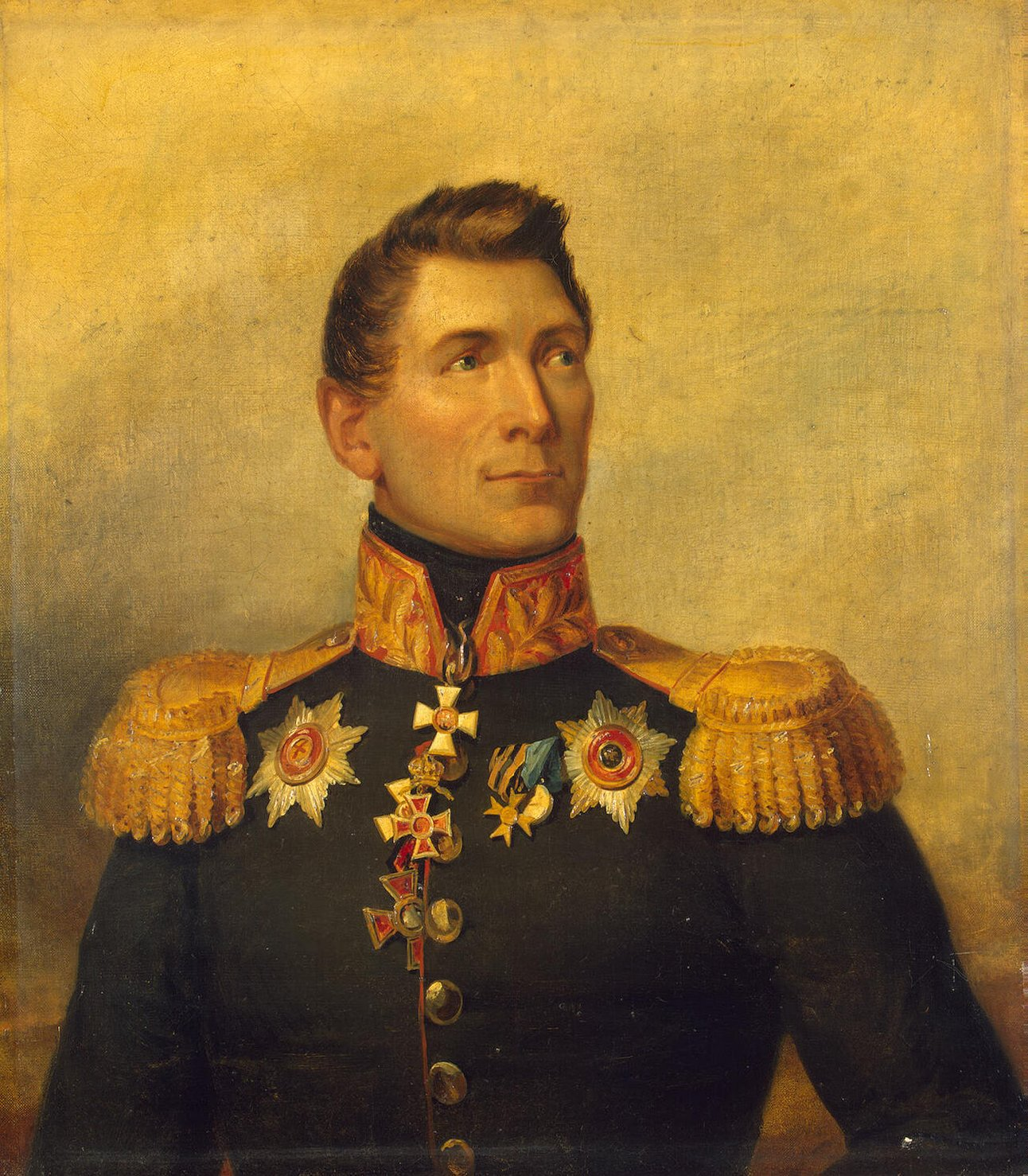

Gotthard August von Helffreich (Russian: Богда́н Бори́сович Гельфре́йх, tr. Bogdán Borísovič Gel'fréjch; 27 January [O.S. 16] 1776 – 24 November [O.S. 12] 1843) was a Baltic German commander of the Imperial Russian Army during the Napoleonic Wars. He was descended from an old Estonian noble family. He served from 1790 to 1823.
