= Semyon Gangeblov =

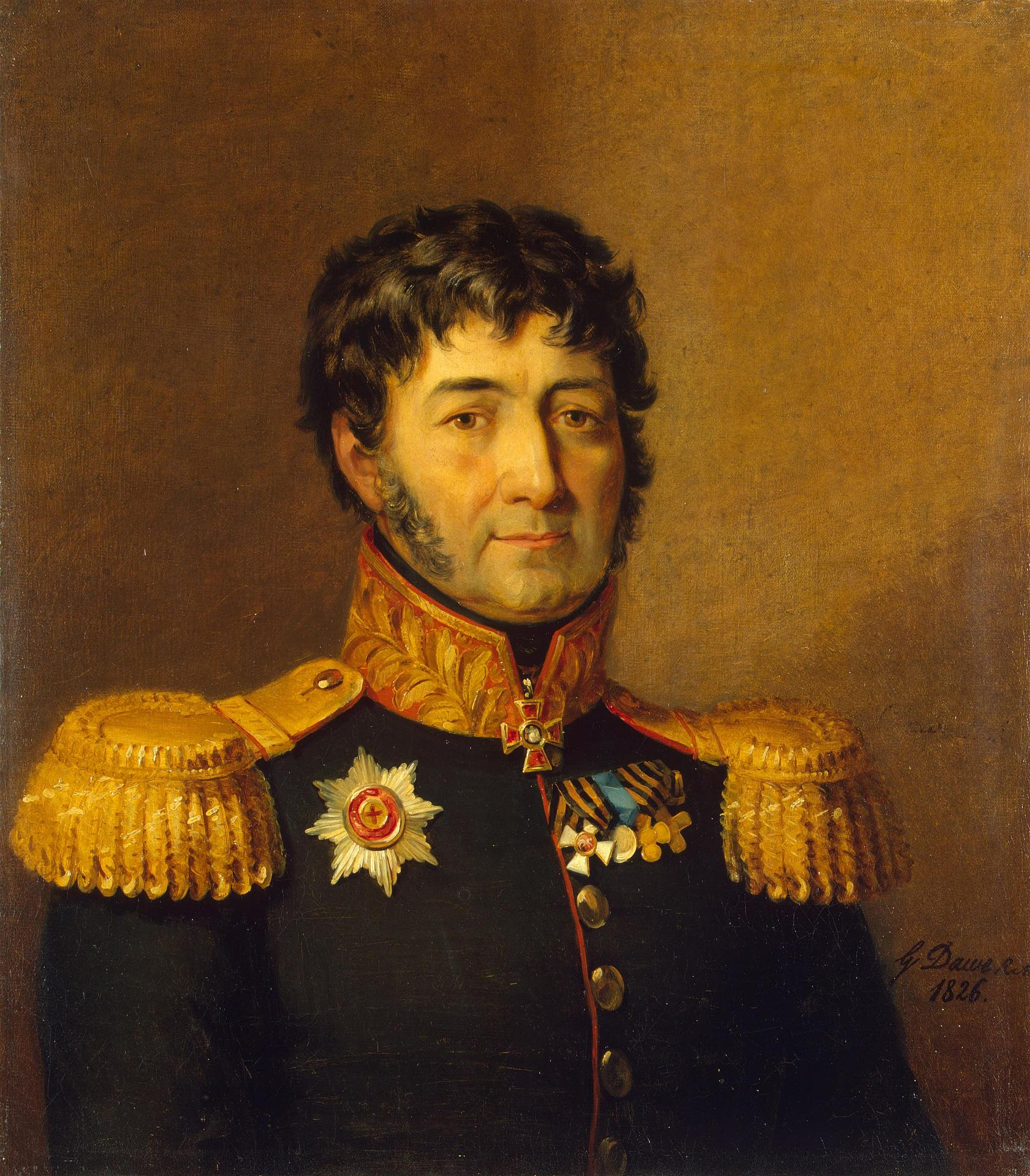
Portrait of S.G. Gangeblov, by George Dawe

Semyon Georgievich Gangeblov (Russian: Семён Георгиевич Гангеблов; 24 May 1757 – 17 February 1827) was a Russian military commander of the Napoleonic Wars. He came of the Georgian noble family Gangeblidze (Gangeblishvili; განგებლიძე, განგებლიშვილი), which emigrated to Russia in 1724.

Born in Moscow, Gangeblov joined the Russian army in 1771 and took part in the war with the Ottoman Empire, being one of the first who climbed the Ochakov citadel in 1788. During Suvorov's Polish campaign of 1794, he commanded a battalion which silenced a Polish battery and took hold of a bridge over the Vistula between Warsaw and its suburb Praga. In 1798, he was promoted colonel and in 1799 major-general in command of a Jäger regiment which bore his name (in 1801, renamed 12th Jäger). Gangeblov fought against the North Caucasian mountaineers in 1807 and took part in an abortive attempt at landing at the Ottoman port of Trabzon in 1810. He was sacked for this failure, but restored to his position in 1811. During Napoleon’s invasion of Russia, Gangeblov’s regiment was attached to the Danube army and participated in the pursuit of the French army into Germany in 1813. Severely injured at the Battle of Bautzen, he finally retired in 1818.
