= Siege of Polotsk (disambiguation) =

The siege of Polotsk might refer to several sieges of the city:

- Siege of Polotsk (1381) by forces of Skirgaila against Andrei of Polotsk
- Siege of Polotsk (1513) by forces of the Grand Duchy of Moscow during the Fourth Muscovite–Lithuanian War (1512–1522)
- Siege of Polotsk (1518) by forces of the Grand Duchy of Moscow during the Fourth Muscovite–Lithuanian War (1512–1522)
- Siege of Polotsk (1563) by forces of the Grand Duchy of Moscow during the Livonian War (1558–1582)
- Siege of Polotsk (1579) by forces of the Polish–Lithuanian Commonwealth during the Livonian War (1558–1582)
- Siege of Polotsk (1654) by forces of the Grand Duchy of Moscow during the Russo-Polish War (1654–67)

See also

- First Battle of Polotsk (17-18 August 1812)
- Second Battle of Polotsk (17-19 October 1812)
