= Stepan Khilkov =

Russian general and prince (1785–1854)

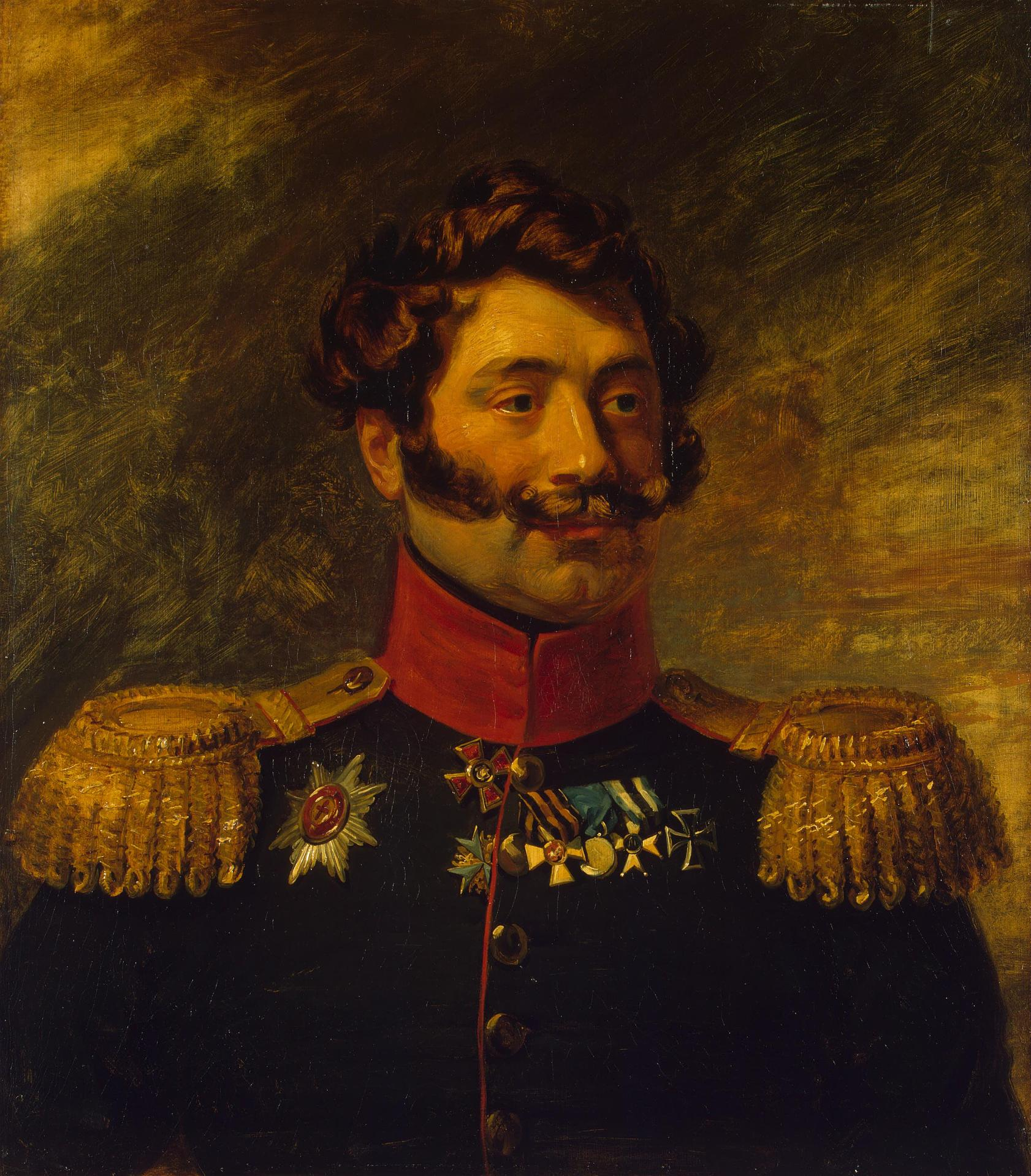

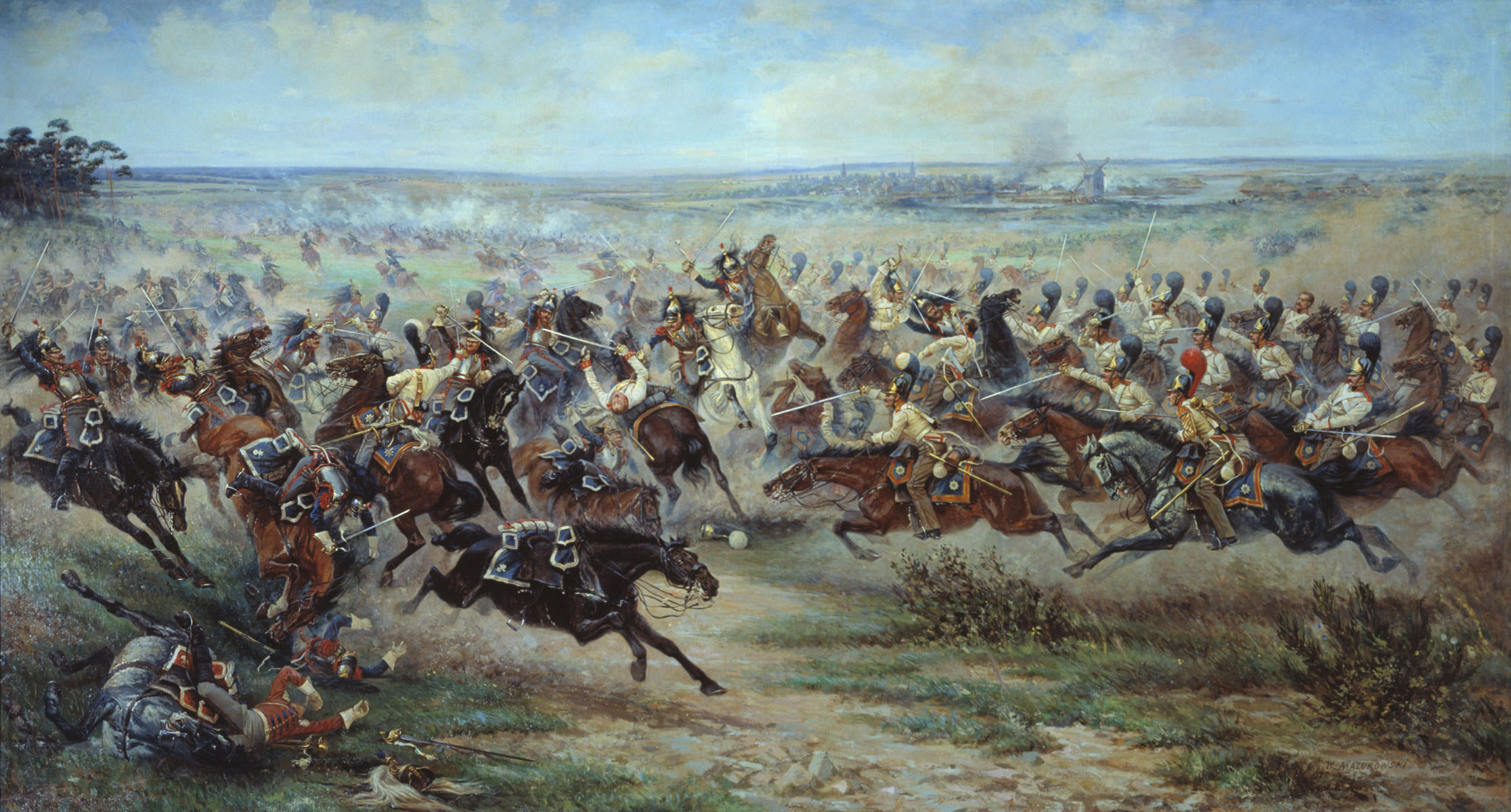
Charge of the Russian Leib Guard on 14 June 1807, by Viktor Mazurovsky

Prince Stepan Khilkoff (14 (25) December 1785 – 10 (22) October 1854 in St. Petersburg) was the eldest son of Prince Alexander Jacobovich Khilkoff. He had a distinguished military career, with his portrait in the hall of heroes in the Military Gallery of the Winter Palace.

== Early life ==
Khilkov was born in Moscow in 1785 to an old Russian noble family with origins in the Tula Governorate. He was educated privately at boarding schools in St Petersburg before attending the Cadet Corps.

== Military career ==
Khilkov joined the Imperial Russian Army as a sub-ensign in the Preobrazhensky Life Guards Regiment on 6 January 1800. In January 1802 he transferred to the Life Guard Horse Regiment in the enlisted rank of junker (this regiment was manned entirely by the nobility). He rose to become standard bearer by 6 February and a cornet on 16 September. Khilkov was promoted to lieutenant on 22 August 1805 and fought in the War of the Third Coalition. At the 2 December 1805 Battle of Austerlitz he led a cavalry charge that captured an eagle of the French 4th Line Regiment, for which he was appointed to the third class of the Order of Saint Anna.

Khilkov fought in the 1807 battles of Gutstadt, Heilsberg and Friedland; in the latter battle he was badly wounded in his right side. For his actions at Friedland he was appointed to the 4th class of the Order of St. George. He was promoted to rotmistr on 2 February 1809 and served on the military staff. He volunteered for service in the Danube region in 1810 and fought at Silistra and Shumen. He later became commander of the Life Guard Dragoon Regiment and was promoted to colonel on 25 October 1811.

During the 1812 French invasion of Russia Khilkov led his regiment in the field at Vilkomir, 1st Vitebsk, Smolensk and Borodino. On 15 September his detachment was attacked by the French at the village of Burtsova, Prince Khilkov turned the rear of the French infantry battalion, attacked and crushed it. He, in turn, was then attacked in the flank by two French squadrons of dragoon guards, but repulsed them with an equally powerful charge. General Dorokhov thanked Prince Khilkov for his success and sent him to demand the enemy's surrender. He was met by rifle fire. Dorokhov ordered another attack, sending Prince Khilkov to cut off the French retreat. K threw half of his squadrons into the attack, but was hit by a bullet in the right of his groin and was carried off the battlefield unconscious. For his service he was advanced to the second class of the Order of Saint Anna and admitted to the 3rd class of the Order of Saint Vladimir.

Khilkov recovered from his wound and returned to service with his regiment in November 1812. On 8 March 1813, Prince Khilkov exchanged shots with Napoleon's guard, but avoided an unequal battle and withdrew. On the 10th he followed the enemy army along the Vitry road; having reached the village of Sompuy, he harassed the French rearguard with rifle fire for two days before returning to his regiment. He took part in the battles of Lutzen and Bautzen, the offensive from Silesia to Dresden, the battle of Dresden and in the two-day-long battle of Kulm on 17 and 18 August; on the 17th he was again hit by a bullet, in his right arm, but he did not leave the field. He was recognised for his actions at Kulm by award of a gold sword and the Prussian Iron Cross. He also fought in the October Battle of Leipzig.

Khilkov fought with the light cavalry in 1814 at Sezanne, Montmirail, Brienne and Arcis-sur-Aube. At the battle of La Fere Champenois, the Tsarevich chose the Household Dragoons to take the enemy guns. Prince Khilkov's two squadrons were the first to attack, but were attacked themselves in the centre of the French line of battle by three squadrons of French cuirassiers. Khilkov turned his men to face the enemy, fell to hard hand-to-hand fighting and overran the cuirassiers. In this battle he was wounded by a pistol bullet in his right hand, fell from his horse and nearly paid for success with his life. He was rewarded wit the Prussian Pour le Merite and the Bavarian Order of Mazimilian Joseph.

On his return to service 21 April 1816 Khilkov was given command of the 2nd Brigade of the 1st Uhlan Division. He was advanced to the first class of the Order of Saint Anna on 24 October 1821 and given command of the Life Guard Hussar Regiment on 4 June 1822. On 8 October 1823 he was appointed to command the 2nd Brigade of the Guard Light Cavalry Division and, on 29 May 1824, the 1st Uhlan Division. He was promoted to lieutenant-general on 3 September 1826 and advanced to the second class of the Order of Saint Vladimir on 17 June 1827. He was granted the crown distinction to his first class appointment to the Order of Saint Anna on 18 December 1830, during the period he was involved in suppressing the Polish November Uprising.

In 1830 he was appointed to command a succession of army corps: the 4th, 3rd and 2nd Reserve Cavalry Corps and then the 4th and 6th Infantry Corps. He was award the diamond insignia of the order of St Alexander Nevsky on 27 September 1834 and retired on 11 January 1837. During his career he was also awarded the Order of Saint John of Jerusalem and medals for Military Merit and 30 years of distinguished service. He briefly returned to service around the Revolutions of 1848 and died in 1854.
