= Ivan Zhevakhov =

Ivan Semyonovich Zhevakhov
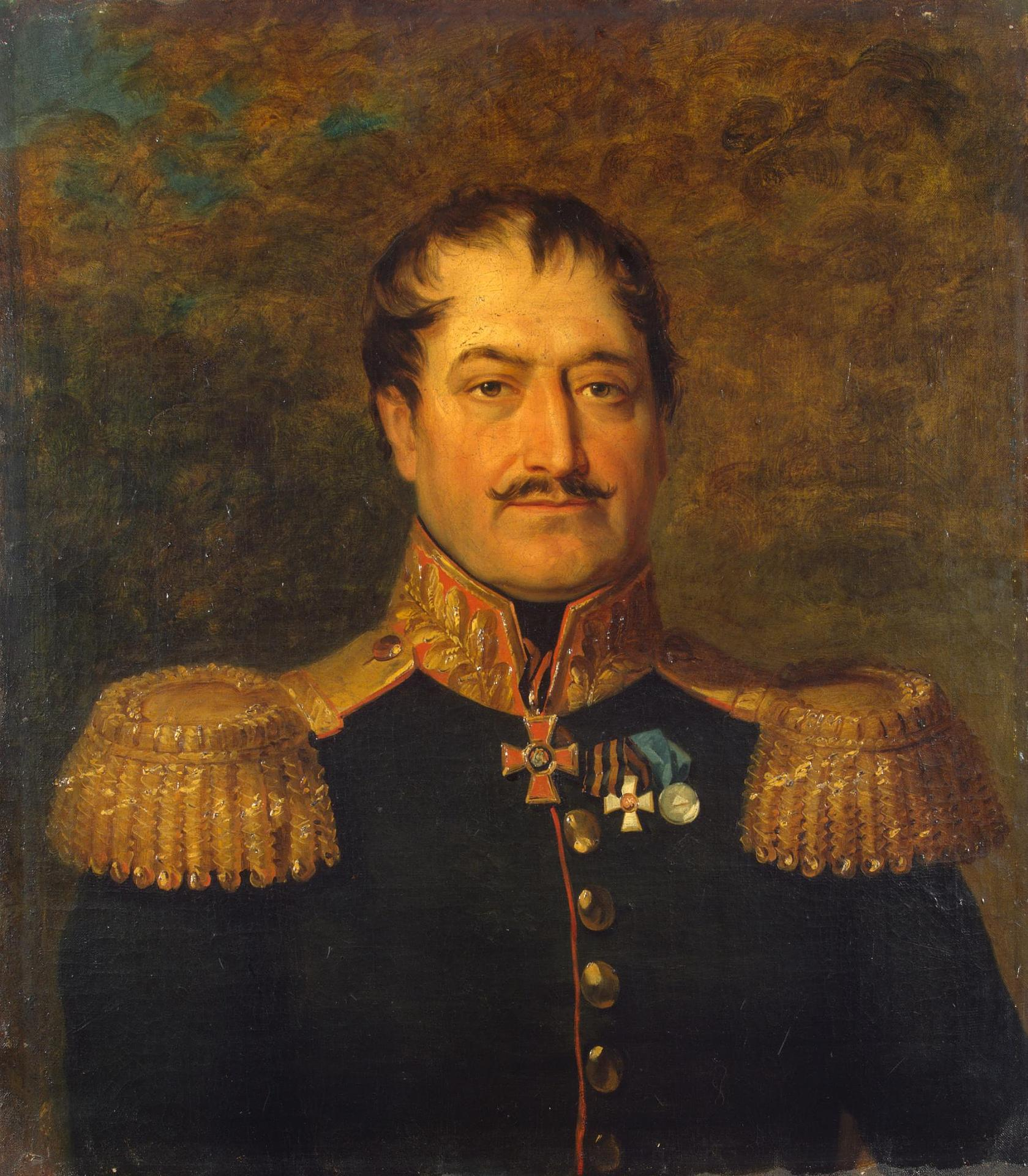
- Portrait by George Dawe
- Born: Ivane Simonis dze Javakhishvil; 1762
- Died: 24 July 1837 (aged 75); Odessa, Russian Empire
- Occupation: Major general
- Known for: Russo-Turkish War (1787–1792); Siege of Ochakov; French invasion of Russia

Ivan Semyonovich Zhevakhov (Russian: Иван Семенович Жевахов), also known as Ivane Simonis dze Javakhishvili (Georgian: ივანე ჯავახიშვილი) (1762 – 24 July 1837) was a Georgian nobleman and a general of the Imperial Russian Army. Zhevakhov is known for his participation in the Napoleonic Wars and the Russo-Turkish War (1787–1792) at the Siege of Ochakov (1789).

== Family ==
Zhevakhov was born in the émigré Georgian family of Prince Simon Javakhishvili who had an estate in Ukraine. He had at least one brother, Filipp, who participated in the conquest of Crimea and was a recipient of the Order of St. Anna. Ivan's branch of the Javakhishvili family originally moved out of Georgia to Russia in the 1730s at the invitation of the exiled Georgian monarch Vakhtang VI.

== Career ==
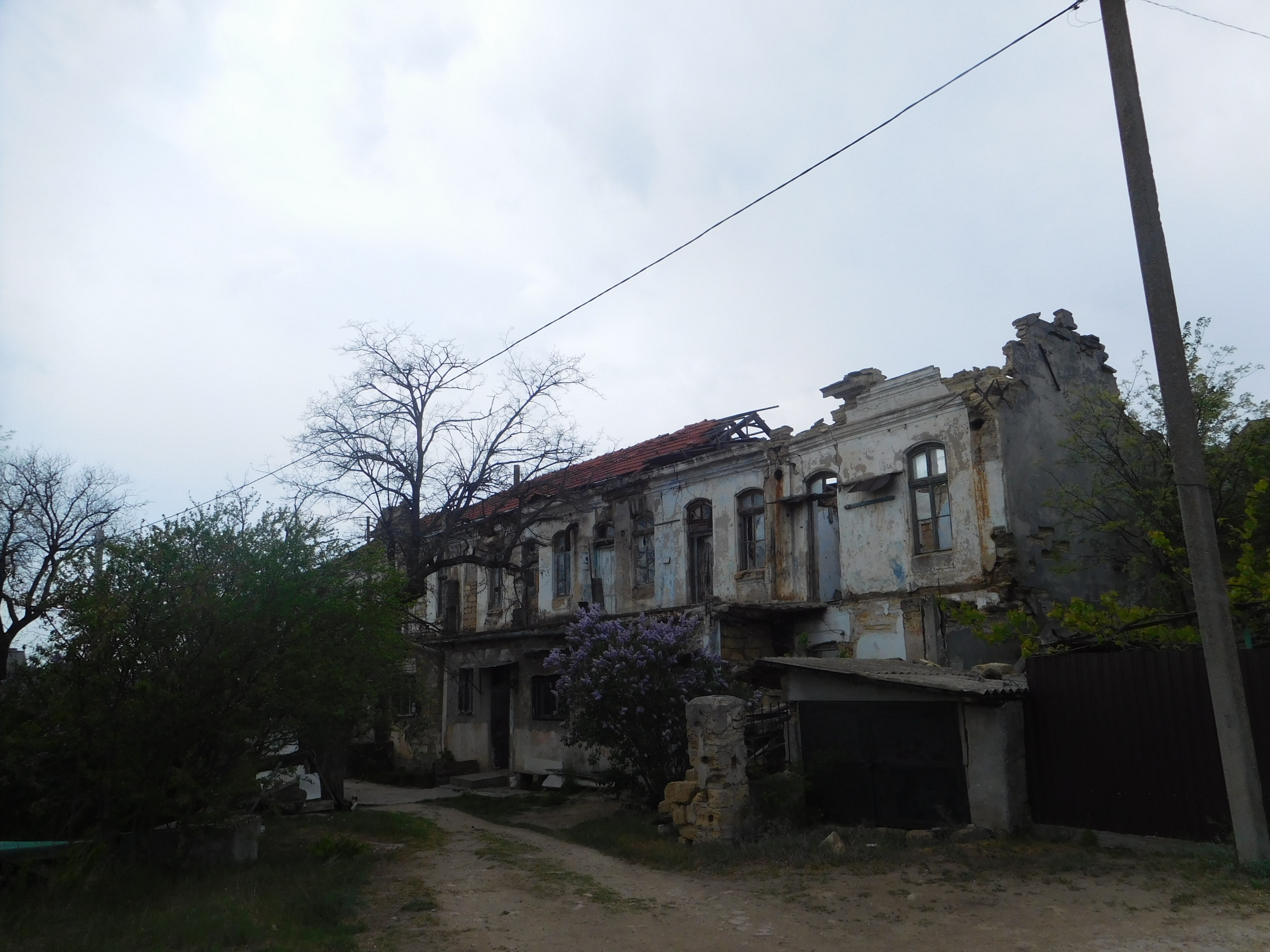
Abandoned manor of Ivan Zhevakhov in Lativka village, Odessa Oblast

Zhevakhov joined the military service as a cadet of the Ukrainian hussar regiment in 1775 and received his first major military experience in fighting with the Trans-Kubanian Circassians in 1777. He then fought in the Russo-Turkish War (1787–1792) and was wounded when storming Ochakov in 1789. Having fought in Poland in 1792, Zhevakhov was promoted to colonel in 1800 and then participated in the wars against Napoleonic France from 1805 to 1807.

During the 1812 French invasion of Russia, he commanded the Serpukhov dragoon regiment within the 3rd Army of the West and contributed to the Russian success in the July 1812 battles of Kobryn and Gorodechna, which halted the French advance toward Kiev. He then led cavalry regiments in Osten-Sacken’s corps and participated in the 1813-14 campaign against Napoleon. On 8 April 1813 he was promoted to the rank of major-general. Zhevakhov resigned due to health problems in 1817 and henceforth lived in Odessa where he died in 1837.

== See also ==
- Pyotr Bagration
- Lev Mikhailovich Yashvil
