= Yermolay Gamper =

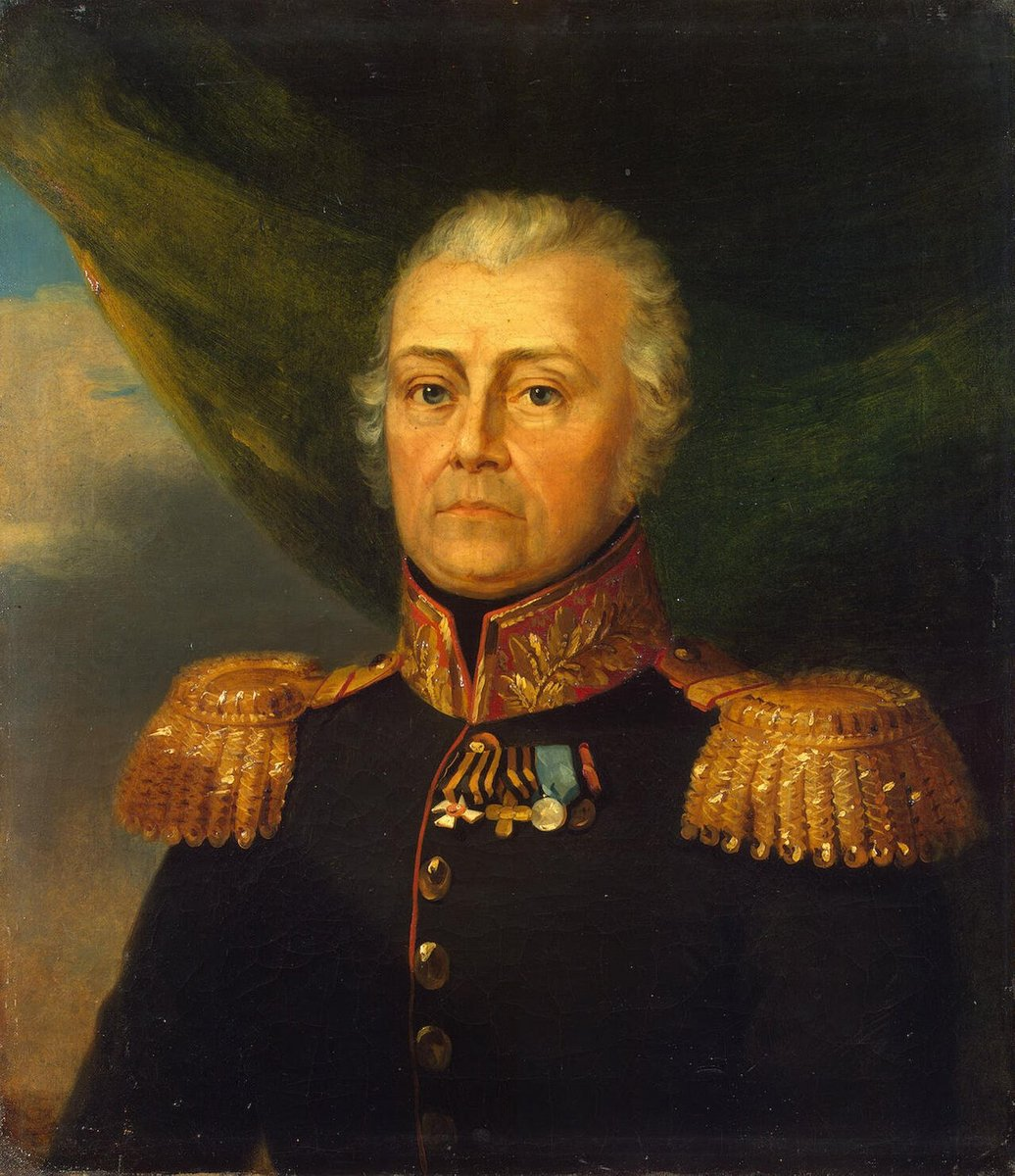
Yermolay Yermolayevich Gamper (1750 – 1814)

Yermolay Yermolayevich Gamper (Russian: Ермолай Ермолаевич Гампер; German: Hermann Christoph Gamper; 1750 – 13 December 1814) was a Russian major general who fought in the Russo-Turkish Wars and Napoleonic Wars.

== Life ==
Born into a Baltic German ennobled family from Courland, he entered the Imperial Russian Army on 3 February 1766 as a soldier in the Kazan Cuirassier Regiment. On 7 April 1766 he was promoted to corporal and on 1 January 1768 to sergeant. In 1770 he fought in the Moldova campaign, fighting at Largo and Cahul. On 21 July, the day of the battle of Cahul, he was promoted to cornet in the Riga Carabinier Regiment. In 1771 he took part in the battles of Bucharest and Zhurzha, rising to lieutenant on 24 November that year. He took part in the 1773-74 operations along the Danube in Bulgaria under Silistria. On 22 September 1773 he was promoted to captain and in November the same year he transferred to the Smolensk Dragoon Regiment.

In 1776, he fought on the Kuban steppes, including a fierce battle with Caucasian mountain brigands. On 30 January 1777 he took part in the occupation of Temryuk, from 1779 to 1782 in the fighting in Poland and in 1783 the capture of the Taurian Peninsula. On 1 January 1786 he was promoted to second major. From 1792 until 1794 he took part in the Polish campaigns once again. During the Kościuszko Uprising, on 26 May 1794 his horse was killed under him. On 29 September that year he was promoted to major for his conduct at the Battle of Maciejowice and he also fought at the storming of Praga (a suburb of Warsaw), taking on a battery of 21 guns.

On 22 September 1795, he was promoted to lieutenant and on the following 20 November was given the Order of St George 4th class for over twenty-five years' service as an officer. He was promoted to colonel on 30 May 1798 and put in command of the Smolensk Dragoon Regiment on 28 July the same year. On 22 February 1800 he was promoted to his final rank of major general, along with an appointment as commander of the 4th Cuirassier Regiment. He retired on 21 July 1800 but re-entered the army on 14 March 1801 and was put in command of the Smolensk Dragoon Regiment. On 24 January 1803 he was made the Chief of the Smolensk Dragoon Regiment.

On 10 November 1806, he was given the Order of St Vladimir 4th class for his thirty-five years of service. In 1807 he was in Moldavia with his regiment and on 3 March fought in battles with the Turks and the siege of the fortress of Izmail. In 1808 he commanded the reserve corps and the following year he took part in the siege and capture of Ishmael. In 1810 he was in Wallachia and Bulgaria and during the siege of Silistria he was awarded the Order of St Anna 1st class. On 8 July he repelled the Turks at the village of Derek after they made a sortie from Shumla, commanding the Smolensk and St Petersburg dragoon regiments - as a reward he was granted a golden sword with diamonds and inscribed "For bravery". On 16 August he was on the right side of the Yantra River and on 26 August he fought at Batyn.

In 1811, he was in command of a detachment on the army's left flank in Wallachia and from 14 June of the army's whole left wing and a flotilla on the Danube. He was instrumental in the capture of Turtukayskogo on 8 October and four days later the taking of Silistra, for which he was awarded the Order of St Vladimir 2nd class, Grand Cross. During the French invasion of Russia, Gamper was in 21st Brigade of the 7th Cavalry Division early in 1812. He raised Napoleon's siege of Minsk. He died of disease on 13 December 1814. He is buried in the village cemetery at Derechin in the Grodno region of Belarus.
