= Spiridon Zhevakhov =

Russian general (1768–1815)

Spiridon Eristovich Zhevakhov (Russian: Спиридон Эристович Жевахов) or Spiridon Javakhishvili (Georgian: სპირიდონ ჯავახიშვილი) (1768 – 25 July 1815) was a Russian general of Georgian noble descent and a participant of the Napoleonic Wars.

Zhevakhov was born in the émigré Georgian family of Prince Javakhishvili who had an estate in Ukraine. He enlisted in the Leib-Guard Preobrazhensky regiment in 1779 and took part in the war against Turkey (1787-1792), Poland (1794), Persia (1796), and Suvorov’s campaign in Switzerland (1799). In 1797, he joined the Pavlograd hussar regiment of which he would become a commander in 1810. He fought against Napoleonic France from 1805 to 1807 and was promoted to a colonel in 1807. During the French invasion of Russia in 1812, Zhevakhov served in the 3rd Army of the West and successfully commanded cavalry units. He distinguished himself in the 1813 Battle of Leipzig and was made a major-general. In 1813, he contributed to the Allies’ victory in the Netherlands. After the end of the hostilities with France, he commanded a brigade in the 3rd hussar division.
