= April 21 =

April 21 this year in various calendars
- Tuesday, 21 April 2026
Akan	Kwabene
Armenian	5 Mareri 1475
Aztec	Xocotlhuetzi 1, 11 Ātl
Babylonian	3 Nisanu, 2337 SE
Balinese pawukon	Menga, Beteng, Sri, Pon, Was, Anggara of Ukir, Sri, Ogan, Pandita
Bengali	8 Boisakh, BS 1433
Chinese	Yin Wood Ox・Turtle Beak Mansion; Fire Horse Year, Month 3, Day 5 (Guyu, 14 days until Lixia)
Common Era	21 April 2026 CE
Coptic	13 Parmouti, AM 1742
Egyptian	5 Thoth, 2775 NE
Ethiopian	13 Miyāzyā, 2018 Amätä Məhrät
French Republican	Décade I, Duodi de Floréal de l'Année 234 de la République
Gregorian	21 April, AD 2026
Hebrew	4 Iyar, AM 5786; Omer 19
Hindu	Mṛgaśiras・Śobhana; Solar: 8 Vaiśākha, 1948 SE; Lunisolar: Caturthī, Śukla pakṣa of Vaiśākha, 2083 VE; Rāudra・5127 KY・1,872,686
Icelandic	Þriðjudagur, 29 Einmánuður 2025
Islamic	4 Dhu al-Qi'dah, AH 1447 (using tabular method)
ISO week date	2026-W17-2
Japanese	5 Yayoi, Reiwa 8 (Kokuu, 14 days until Rikka)
Julian	8 April, AD 2026 (AM 7534)
Julian day	2461152
Korean	5 Yongdal, 4359 DE
Maya	13.0.13.9.9; 2 Uo, 11 Muluc
Roman	ante diem VI Idus Apriles, MMDCCLXXIX AUC
Solar Hijri	1 Ordibehesht, SH 1405
Tibetan	4 nag pa, me pho rta 2153 or 1772 or 1000

<<	April					>>
Su	Mo	Tu	We	Th	Fr	Sa
			1	2	3	4
5	6	7	8	9	10	11
12	13	14	15	16	17	18
19	20	21	22	23	24	25
26	27	28	29	30
2026

April 21 in recent years
2026 (Tuesday)
2025 (Monday)
2024 (Sunday)
2023 (Friday)
2022 (Thursday)
2021 (Wednesday)
2020 (Tuesday)
2019 (Sunday)
2018 (Saturday)
2017 (Friday)

April 21 is the 111th day of the year (112th in leap years) in the Gregorian calendar; 254 days remain until the end of the year.

== Events ==
=== Pre-1600 ===
- 753 BC – Romulus founds Rome (traditional date).
- 43 BC – Battle of Mutina: Mark Antony is again defeated in battle by Aulus Hirtius, who is killed. Antony fails to capture Mutina and Decimus Brutus is murdered shortly after.
- 900 – The Laguna Copperplate Inscription (the earliest known written document found in what is now the Philippines): the Commander-in-Chief of the Kingdom of Tondo, as represented by the Honourable Jayadewa, Lord Minister of Pailah, pardons from all debt the Honourable Namwaran and his relations.
- 1092 – The Diocese of Pisa is elevated to the rank of metropolitan archdiocese by Pope Urban II.
- 1506 – The three-day Lisbon Massacre comes to an end with the slaughter of over 1,900 suspected Jews by Portuguese Catholics.
- 1509 – Henry VIII ascends the throne of England on the death of his father, Henry VII.
- 1526 – The last ruler of the Lodi dynasty, Ibrahim Lodi, is defeated and killed by Babur in the First Battle of Panipat.

=== 1601–1900 ===
- 1615 – The Wignacourt Aqueduct is inaugurated in Malta.
- 1782 – The city of Rattanakosin, now known internationally as Bangkok, is founded on the eastern bank of the Chao Phraya River by King Buddha Yodfa Chulaloke.
- 1789 – John Adams sworn in as first US Vice President (nine days before George Washington).
- 1789 – George Washington's reception at Trenton is hosted by the Ladies of Trenton as he journeys to New York City for his first inauguration.
- 1792 – Tiradentes, a revolutionary leading a movement for Brazil's independence, is hanged, drawn and quartered.
- 1796 – War of the First Coalition: In the climax of the Montenotte Campaign, Napoleon Bonaparte decisively defeats the army of Piedmont at the Battle of Mondovi, leading to Piedmont's surrender a week later and decisively turning the Italian campaign in France's favor.
- 1802 – Twelve thousand Wahhabis sack Karbala, killing over three thousand inhabitants.
- 1806 – Action of 21 April 1806: A French frigate escapes British forces off the coast of South Africa.
- 1809 – Two Austrian army corps are driven from Landshut by a First French Empire army led by Napoleon as two French corps to the north hold off the main Austrian army on the first day of the Battle of Eckmühl.
- 1821 – Benderli Ali Pasha arrives in Constantinople as the new Grand Vizier of the Ottoman Empire; he remains in power for only nine days before being sent into exile.
- 1836 – Texas Revolution: The Battle of San Jacinto: Republic of Texas forces under Sam Houston defeat troops under Mexican General Antonio López de Santa Anna.
- 1856 – Australian labour movement: Stonemasons and building workers on building sites around Melbourne march from the University of Melbourne to Parliament House to achieve an eight-hour day.
- 1894 – Norway formally adopts the Krag–Jørgensen bolt-action rifle as the main arm of its armed forces, a weapon that would remain in service for almost 50 years.
- 1898 – Spanish–American War: The United States Navy begins a blockade of Cuban ports. When the U.S. Congress issued a declaration of war on April 25, it declared that a state of war had existed from this date.

=== 1901–present ===
- 1914 – Ypiranga incident: A German arms shipment to Mexico is intercepted by the U.S. Navy near Veracruz.
- 1918 – World War I: German fighter ace Manfred von Richthofen, better known as "The Red Baron", is shot down and killed over Vaux-sur-Somme in France.
- 1926 – Al-Baqi cemetery, former site of the mausoleum of four Shi'a Imams, is leveled to the ground by Wahhabis.
- 1934 – The "Surgeon's Photograph", the most famous photo allegedly showing the Loch Ness Monster, is published in the Daily Mail (in 1994, it is revealed to be a hoax).
- 1945 – World War II: Soviet forces south of Berlin at Zossen attack the German High Command headquarters.
- 1946 – The U.S. Weather Bureau records that a tornado which struck Timber Lake, South Dakota was 4 miles (6.4 km), among the widest tornadoes on record.
- 1948 – United Nations Security Council Resolution 47 relating to Kashmir conflict is adopted.
- 1950 – The Nainital wedding massacre occurs, killing 22 members of the Harijan caste.
- 1952 – Secretary's Day (now Administrative Professionals' Day) is first celebrated.
- 1958 – United Air Lines Flight 736 collides with a United States Air Force fighter jet near Arden, Nevada in what is now Enterprise, Nevada.
- 1960 – Brasília, Brazil's capital, is officially inaugurated. At 09:30, the Three Powers of the Republic are simultaneously transferred from the old capital, Rio de Janeiro.
- 1962 – The Seattle World's Fair (Century 21 Exposition) opens. It is the first World's Fair in the United States since World War II.
- 1963 – The first election of the Universal House of Justice is held, marking its establishment as the supreme governing institution of the Baháʼí Faith.
- 1964 – A Transit-5bn satellite fails to reach orbit after launch; as it re-enters the atmosphere, 2.1 pounds (0.95 kg) of radioactive plutonium in its SNAP RTG power source is widely dispersed.
- 1965 – The 1964–1965 New York World's Fair opens for its second and final season.
- 1966 – Rastafari movement: Haile Selassie of Ethiopia visits Jamaica, an event now celebrated as Grounation Day.
- 1967 – A few days before the general election in Greece, Colonel George Papadopoulos leads a coup d'état, establishing a military regime that lasts for seven years.
- 1967 – A tornado outbreak in Illinois, United States, kills over 50 and injures over 1,000. Belvidere sustains over 500 casualties as a violent tornado strikes the high school. Another tornado near Chicago causes another 500 casualties, devastating Oak Lawn.
- 1972 – Astronauts John Young and Charles Duke fly Apollo 16's Apollo Lunar Module to the Moon's surface, the fifth NASA Apollo Program crewed lunar landing.
- 1975 – Vietnam War: President of South Vietnam Nguyễn Văn Thiệu flees Saigon, as Xuân Lộc, the last South Vietnamese outpost blocking a direct North Vietnamese assault on Saigon, falls.
- 1977 – Annie opens on Broadway.
- 1982 – Baseball: Rollie Fingers of the Milwaukee Brewers becomes the first pitcher to record 300 saves.
- 1985 – The compound of the militant group The Covenant, The Sword, and the Arm of the Lord surrenders to federal authorities in Arkansas after a two-day government siege.
- 1987 – The Tamil Tigers are blamed for a car bomb that detonates in the Sri Lankan capital city of Colombo, killing 106 people.
- 1989 – Tiananmen Square protests of 1989: In Beijing, around 100,000 students gather in Tiananmen Square to commemorate Chinese reform leader Hu Yaobang.
- 1993 – The Supreme Court in La Paz, Bolivia, sentences former dictator Luis García Meza to 30 years in jail without parole for murder, theft, fraud and violating the constitution.
- 1996 – Four people are killed and 75 are injured in a train accident in Jokela, Finland.
- 2004 – Five suicide car bombers target police stations in and around Basra, killing 74 people and wounding 160.
- 2010 – The controversial Kharkiv Pact (Russian Ukrainian Naval Base for Gas Treaty) is signed in Kharkiv, Ukraine, by Ukrainian president Viktor Yanukovych and Russian president Dmitry Medvedev; it was unilaterally terminated by Russia on March 31, 2014.
- 2012 – Two trains are involved in a head-on collision near Sloterdijk, Amsterdam, in the Netherlands, killing one person and injuring 116 others.
- 2019 – Eight bombs explode at churches, hotels, and other locations in Sri Lanka on Easter Sunday, killing at least 269.
- 2021 – Indonesian Navy submarine KRI Nanggala (402) sinks in the Bali Sea during a military drill, killing all 53 on board.

== Births ==
=== Pre-1600 ===
- 1132 – Sancho VI, king of Navarre (died 1194)
- 1488 – Ulrich von Hutten, German religious reformer (died 1523)
- 1523 – Marco Antonio Bragadin, Venetian lawyer and military officer (died 1571)
- 1555 – Ludovico Carracci, Italian painter and etcher (died 1619)

=== 1601–1900 ===
- 1619 – Jan van Riebeeck, Dutch founder of Cape Town (died 1677)
- 1630 – Pieter Gerritsz van Roestraten, Dutch-English painter (died 1700)
- 1631 – Francesco Maidalchini, Catholic cardinal (died 1700)
- 1642 – Simon de la Loubère, French mathematician, poet, and diplomat (died 1729)
- 1651 – Joseph Vaz, Sri Lankan priest, missionary, and saint (died 1711)
- 1652 – Michel Rolle, French mathematician and academic (died 1719)
- 1671 – John Law, Scottish economist (died 1729)
- 1673 – Wilhelmine Amalia of Brunswick-Lüneburg (died 1742)
- 1713 – Louis de Noailles, French general (died 1793)
- 1730 – Antonín Kammel, Czech violinist and composer (died 1788)
- 1752 – Pierre-Alexandre-Laurent Forfait, French engineer, hydrographer, and politician, French Minister of Marine and the Colonies (died 1807)
- 1752 – Humphry Repton, English gardener and author (died 1818)
- 1774 – Jean-Baptiste Biot, French physicist, astronomer, and mathematician (died 1862)
- 1775 – Alexander Anderson, Scottish-American illustrator and engraver (died 1870)
- 1783 – Reginald Heber, English priest (died 1821)
- 1790 – Manuel Blanco Encalada, Spanish-Chilean admiral and politician, 1st President of Chile (died 1876)
- 1810 – John Putnam Chapin, American politician, 10th Mayor of Chicago (died 1864)
- 1811 – Alson Sherman, American merchant and politician, 8th Mayor of Chicago (died 1903)
- 1814 – Angela Burdett-Coutts, 1st Baroness Burdett-Coutts, English art collector and philanthropist (died 1906)
- 1816 – Charlotte Brontë, English novelist and poet (died 1855)
- 1837 – Fredrik Bajer, Danish lieutenant and politician, Nobel Prize laureate (died 1922)
- 1838 – John Muir, Scottish-American environmentalist and author (died 1914)
- 1854 – William Stang, German-American bishop (died 1907)
- 1864 – Max Weber, German economist and sociologist (died 1920)
- 1868 – Alfred Henry Maurer, American painter (died 1932)
- 1868 – Mary Rogers Miller, American author and educator (died 1971)
- 1870 – Edwin Stanton Porter, American director, producer, and screenwriter (died 1941)
- 1874 – Vincent Scotto, French composer and actor (died 1952)
- 1882 – Percy Williams Bridgman, American physicist and academic, Nobel Prize laureate (died 1961)
- 1885 – Tatu Kolehmainen, Finnish runner (died 1967)
- 1887 – Joe McCarthy, American baseball manager (died 1978)
- 1889 – Marcel Boussac, French businessman (died 1980)
- 1889 – Paul Karrer, Russian-Swiss chemist and academic, Nobel Prize laureate (died 1971)
- 1889 – Efrem Zimbalist, Sr., Russian-American violinist, composer, and conductor (died 1985)
- 1892 – Freddie Dixon, English motorcycle racer and racing driver (died 1956)
- 1893 – Romeo Bertini, Italian runner (died 1973)
- 1897 – Odd Lindbäck-Larsen, Norwegian Army general and war historian (died 1975)
- 1898 – Maurice Wilson, English soldier, pilot, and mountaineer (died 1934)
- 1899 – Randall Thompson, American composer and academic (died 1984)

=== 1901–present ===
- 1903 – Luis Saslavsky, Argentinian director, producer, and screenwriter (died 1995)
- 1904 – Jean Hélion, French painter (died 1987)
- 1904 – Odilo Globocnik, Italian-Austrian SS officer and Holocaust perpetrator (died 1945)
- 1905 – Pat Brown, American lawyer and politician, 32nd Governor of California (died 1996)
- 1911 – Ivan Combe, American businessman, developed Clearasil (died 2000)
- 1911 – Kemal Satır, Turkish physician and politician (died 1991)
- 1912 – Eve Arnold, Russian-American photojournalist (died 2012)
- 1912 – Marcel Camus, French director and screenwriter (died 1982)
- 1913 – Norman Parkinson, English photographer (died 1990)
- 1914 – Angelo Savoldi, Italian-American wrestler and promoter, co-founded International World Class Championship Wrestling (died 2013)
- 1915 – Garrett Hardin, American ecologist, author, and academic (died 2003)
- 1915 – Anthony Quinn, Mexican-American actor (died 2001)
- 1916 – Estella B. Diggs, American businesswoman and politician (died 2013)
- 1918 – Eddy Christiani, Dutch singer-songwriter and guitarist (died 2016)
- 1919 – Don Cornell, American singer (died 2004)
- 1919 – Roger Doucet, Canadian tenor (died 1981)
- 1919 – Licio Gelli, Italian financer (died 2015)
- 1922 – Alistair MacLean, Scottish novelist and screenwriter (died 1987)
- 1922 – Allan Watkins, Welsh-English cricketer (died 2011)
- 1923 – John Mortimer, English lawyer and author (died 2009)
- 1924 – Ira Louvin, American singer-songwriter and mandolin player (died 1965)
- 1925 – Anthony Mason, Australian soldier and judge, 9th Chief Justice of Australia (died 2026)
- 1925 – John Swinton of Kimmerghame, English general and politician, Lord Lieutenant of Berwickshire (died 2018)
- 1926 – Elizabeth II, Queen of the United Kingdom and her other realms (died 2022)
- 1926 – Arthur Rowley, English footballer, manager, and cricketer (died 2002)
- 1927 – Ahmed Arif, Turkish poet and author (died 1991)
- 1928 – Jack Evans, Welsh-Canadian ice hockey player and coach (died 1996)
- 1930 – Hilda Hilst, Brazilian author, poet, and playwright (died 2004)
- 1930 – Silvana Mangano, Italian actress (died 1989)
- 1930 – Dieter Roth, German-Swiss illustrator and sculptor (died 1998)
- 1930 – Jack Taylor, English footballer and referee (died 2012)
- 1931 – Morgan Wootten, American high school basketball coach (died 2020)
- 1932 – Slide Hampton, African-American trombonist and composer (died 2021)
- 1932 – Elaine May, American actress, comedian, director, and screenwriter
- 1932 – Angela Mortimer, English tennis player (died 2025)
- 1933 – Edelmiro Amante, Filipino lawyer and politician (died 2013)
- 1933 – Easley Blackwood, Jr., American pianist, composer, and educator (died 2023)
- 1933 – Ignatius Zakka I Iwas, Iraqi patriarch (died 2014)
- 1935 – Charles Grodin, American actor and talk show host (died 2021)
- 1935 – Thomas Kean, American academic and politician, 48th Governor of New Jersey
- 1936 – James Dobson, American evangelist, psychologist, and author, founded Focus on the Family (died 2025)
- 1936 – Reg Fleming, Canadian-American ice hockey player (died 2009)
- 1937 – Gary Peters, American baseball player (died 2023)
- 1937 – Ben Zinn, Israeli-born American academic and former international soccer player
- 1939 – John McCabe, English pianist and composer (died 2015)
- 1939 – Sister Helen Prejean, American nun, activist, and author
- 1939 – Reni Santoni, American actor (died 2020)
- 1940 – Jacques Caron, Canadian ice hockey player and coach
- 1940 – Souleymane Cissé, Malian director, producer, and screenwriter (died 2025)
- 1941 – David Boren, American lawyer and politician, 21st Governor of Oklahoma (died 2025)
- 1942 – Geoffrey Palmer, New Zealand politician, 33rd Prime Minister of New Zealand
- 1945 – Srinivasaraghavan Venkataraghavan, Indian cricketer and umpire
- 1945 – Mark Wainberg, Canadian researcher and HIV/AIDS activist (died 2017)
- 1945 – Diana Darvey, English actress, singer and dancer (died 2000)
- 1947 – Al Bumbry, American baseball player
- 1947 – Iggy Pop, American singer-songwriter, producer, and actor
- 1947 – John Weider, English bass player
- 1948 – Gary Condit, American businessman and politician
- 1948 – Paul Davis, American singer-songwriter and musician (died 2008)
- 1948 – Josef Flammer, Swiss ophthalmologist
- 1948 – Dieter Fromm, German runner
- 1949 – Patti LuPone, American actress and singer
- 1950 – Shivaji Satam, Indian actor
- 1951 – Tony Danza, American actor and producer
- 1951 – Michael Freedman, American mathematician and academic
- 1951 – Bob Varsha, American sportscaster
- 1951 – Steve Vickers, Canadian ice hockey player
- 1951 – Soledad Gallego-Díaz, Spanish journalist (died 2026)
- 1952 – Gerald Early, American author and academic
- 1952 – Cheryl Gillan, British businesswoman and politician, Secretary of State for Wales (died 2021)
- 1953 – John Brumby, Australian politician, 45th Premier of Victoria
- 1954 – Ebiet G. Ade, Indonesian singer-songwriter and guitarist
- 1954 – James Morrison, American actor, director, producer, and screenwriter
- 1954 – Mike Wingfield, South African academic and scientist
- 1955 – Murathan Mungan, Turkish author, poet, and playwright
- 1956 – Peter Kosminsky, English director, producer, and screenwriter
- 1956 – Phillip Longman, German-American demographer and journalist
- 1957 – Hervé Le Tellier, French linguist and author
- 1957 – Herbert Wetterauer, German painter, sculptor, and author
- 1958 – Andie MacDowell, American model, actress, and producer
- 1958 – Yoshito Usui, Japanese illustrator (died 2009)
- 1958 – Michael Zarnock, American author
- 1959 – Tim Jacobus, American illustrator and painter
- 1959 – Robert Smith, English singer-songwriter and guitarist
- 1961 – David Servan-Schreiber, French physician, neuroscientist, and author (died 2011)
- 1963 – Ken Caminiti, American baseball player (died 2004)
- 1963 – John Cameron Mitchell, American actor and director
- 1965 – Fiona Kelleghan, American academic, critic and librarian
- 1966 – Michael Franti, American singer-songwriter and rapper
- 1969 – Toby Stephens, English actor
- 1970 – Glen Hansard, Irish singer-songwriter (died 2026)
- 1970 – Rob Riggle, American actor and comedian
- 1970 – Nicole Sullivan, American actress and comedian
- 1971 – Michael Turner, American author and illustrator (died 2008)
- 1973 – Steve Backshall, English naturalist, writer, and television presenter
- 1974 – David Peachey, Australian rugby league player
- 1975 – Danyon Loader, New Zealand swimmer
- 1976 – Petero Civoniceva, Fijian-Australian rugby league player
- 1977 – Gyula Koi, Hungarian scholar and educator
- 1977 – Jamie Salé, Canadian figure skater
- 1979 – Virginie Basselot, French chef
- 1979 – James McAvoy, Scottish actor
- 1980 – Tony Romo, American football player and announcer
- 1983 – Tarvaris Jackson, American football player (died 2020)
- 1983 – Kim Wall, British sprinter
- 1988 – Ricky Berens, American swimmer
- 1988 – Jencarlos Canela, American singer-songwriter and actor
- 1988 – Christoph Sanders, American actor
- 1989 – Nikki Cross, Scottish wrestler
- 1991 – Frank Dillane, British actor
- 1992 – Isco, Spanish footballer
- 1992 – Joc Pederson, American baseball player
- 1994 – Ludwig Augustinsson, Swedish footballer
- 1995 – Ana Grozdanović, Serbian politician
- 1996 – Arianne Hartono, Dutch tennis player
- 1997 – Mikel Oyarzabal, Spanish footballer
- 1998 – Jarrett Allen, American basketball player
- 1999 – Choi Hyun-suk, South Korean rapper
- 2003 – Xavi Simons, Dutch footballer
- 2007 – Princess Isabella of Denmark, daughter of King Frederik X and Queen Mary of Denmark
- 2008 – Hyein, South Korean singer

== Deaths ==
=== Pre-1600 ===
- 234 – Emperor Xian of Han, Chinese emperor (born 181)
- 586 – Liuvigild, king of the Visigoths
- 847 – Odgar, Frankish archbishop of Mainz
- 866 – Bardas, de facto regent of the Byzantine Empire
- 941 – Bajkam, de facto regent of the Abbasid Caliphate
- 1073 – Pope Alexander II
- 1109 – Anselm of Canterbury, Italian-English archbishop and saint (born 1033)
- 1136 – Stephen, Count of Tréguier Breton noblemen (born c. 1058/62)
- 1142 – Peter Abelard, French philosopher and theologian (born 1079)
- 1213 – Maria of Montpellier, Lady of Montpellier, Queen of Aragon (born 1182)
- 1329 – Frederick IV, Duke of Lorraine (born 1282)
- 1400 – John Wittlebury, English politician (born 1333)
- 1509 – Henry VII of England (born 1457)
- 1557 – Petrus Apianus, German mathematician and astronomer (born 1495)
- 1574 – Cosimo I de' Medici, Grand Duke of Tuscany (born 1519)
- 1591 – Sen no Rikyū, Japanese exponent of the tea ceremony (born 1522)

=== 1601–1900 ===
- 1650 – Yagyū Jūbei Mitsuyoshi, Japanese samurai (born 1607)
- 1668 – Jan Boeckhorst, Flemish painter (born c. 1604)
- 1699 – Jean Racine, French playwright and poet (born 1639)
- 1719 – Philippe de La Hire, French mathematician and astronomer (born 1640)
- 1720 – Antoine Hamilton, Irish-French soldier and author (born 1646)
- 1722 – Robert Beverley, Jr., English historian and author (born 1673)
- 1736 – Prince Eugene of Savoy (born 1663)
- 1740 – Thomas Tickell, English poet and author (born 1685)
- 1758 – Francesco Zerafa, Maltese architect (born 1679)
- 1815 – Joseph Winston, American soldier and politician (born 1746)
- 1825 – Johann Friedrich Pfaff, German mathematician and academic (born 1765)
- 1852 – Ivan Nabokov, Russian general (born 1787)
- 1863 – Sir Robert Bateson, 1st Baronet, Irish politician (born 1782)
- 1900 – Vikramatji Khimojiraj, Indian ruler (born 1819)

=== 1901–present ===
- 1910 – Mark Twain, American novelist, humorist, and critic (born 1835)
- 1918 – Manfred von Richthofen, German captain and pilot, known popularly as the Red Baron (born 1892)
- 1924 – Eleonora Duse, Italian actress (born 1858)
- 1930 – Robert Bridges, English poet and author (born 1844)
- 1932 – Friedrich Gustav Piffl, Bohemian cardinal (born 1864)
- 1938 – Allama Muhammad Iqbal, Pakistani National philosopher and poet (born 1877)
- 1941 – Fritz Manteuffel, German gymnast (born 1875)
- 1945 – Walter Model, German field marshal (born 1891)
- 1946 – John Maynard Keynes, English economist and philosopher (born 1883)
- 1947 – Meir Feinstein (born 1929, disputed) with Moshe Barazani (born c. 1927), suicide militants.
- 1948 – Aldo Leopold, American ecologist and author (born 1887)
- 1952 – Leslie Banks, American actor, director and producer (born 1890)
- 1954 – Emil Leon Post, Polish-American mathematician and logician (born 1897)
- 1956 – Charles MacArthur, American playwright and screenwriter (born 1895)
- 1965 – Edward Victor Appleton, English-Scottish physicist and academic, Nobel Prize laureate (born 1892)
- 1971 – François Duvalier, Haitian physician and politician, 40th President of Haiti (born 1907)
- 1973 – Arthur Fadden, Australian accountant and politician, 13th Prime Minister of Australia (born 1894)
- 1973 – Kemal Tahir, Turkish journalist and author (born 1910)
- 1977 – Gummo Marx, American vaudevillian and talent agent (born 1892)
- 1978 – Sandy Denny, English singer-songwriter (born 1947)
- 1978 – Thomas Wyatt Turner, American biologist and academic (born 1877)
- 1980 – Alexander Oparin, Russian biochemist and academic (born 1894)
- 1980 – Sohrab Sepehri, Iranian poet and painter (born 1928)
- 1983 – Walter Slezak, Austrian-American actor and singer (born 1902)
- 1984 – Marcel Janco, Romanian-Israeli artist (born 1895)
- 1984 – Hristo Prodanov, Bulgarian engineer and mountaineer (born 1943)
- 1985 – Rudi Gernreich, Austrian-American fashion designer, created the monokini (born 1922)
- 1985 – Tancredo Neves, Brazilian banker and politician, Prime Minister of Brazil (born 1910)
- 1986 – Marjorie Eaton, American painter and actress (born 1901)
- 1986 – Salah Jahin, Egyptian poet, playwright, and composer (born 1930)
- 1987 – Gustav Bergmann, Austrian-American philosopher from the Vienna Circle (born 1906)
- 1990 – Erté, Russian-French illustrator (born 1892)
- 1991 – Willi Boskovsky, Austrian violinist and conductor (born 1909)
- 1992 – Väinö Linna, Finnish author (born 1920)
- 1996 – Abdul Hafeez Kardar, Pakistani cricketer (born 1925)
- 1996 – Jimmy Snyder, American sportscaster (born 1919)
- 1997 – Diosdado Macapagal, Filipino lawyer and politician, 9th President of the Philippines (born 1910)
- 1998 – Jean-François Lyotard, French sociologist and philosopher (born 1924)
- 1999 – Buddy Rogers, American actor (born 1904)
- 2003 – Nina Simone, American singer-songwriter, pianist, and activist (born 1933)
- 2005 – Zhang Chunqiao, Chinese writer and politician, member of the Gang of Four (born 1917)
- 2010 – Gustav Lorentzen, Norwegian singer-songwriter and guitarist (born 1947)
- 2010 – Juan Antonio Samaranch, Spanish businessman, seventh President of the International Olympic Committee (born 1920)
- 2010 – Kanagaratnam Sriskandan, Sri Lankan-English engineer and civil servant (born 1930)
- 2011 – Catharina Halkes, Dutch theologian and academic (born 1920)
- 2012 – Doris Betts, American author and academic (born 1932)
- 2013 – Shakuntala Devi, Indian mathematician and astrologer (born 1929)
- 2013 – Leopold Engleitner, Austrian Holocaust survivor, author, and educator (born 1905)
- 2014 – George H. Heilmeier, American engineer (born 1936)
- 2014 – Win Tin, Burmese journalist and politician, co-founded the National League for Democracy (born 1930)
- 2016 – Prince, American singer-songwriter, guitarist, producer, and actor (born 1958)
- 2017 – Ugo Ehiogu, English footballer (born 1972)
- 2018 – Nabi Tajima, Japanese supercentenarian (born 1900)
- 2019 – Polly Higgins, Scottish barrister, author and environmental lobbyist (born 1968)
- 2024 – Terry A. Anderson, American journalist (born 1947)
- 2025 – Pope Francis (born 1936)

== Holidays and observances ==
- Christian feast day:
  - Abdecalas
  - Anastasius Sinaita
  - Anselm of Canterbury
  - Conrad of Parzham
  - Holy Infant of Good Health
  - Máel Ruba
  - Shemon Bar Sabbae
  - Wolbodo
  - April 21 (Eastern Orthodox liturgics)
- Natale di Roma (Rome)
- Parilia (ancient Rome)
- Civil Service Day (India)
- Grounation Day (Rastafari)
- National Tea Day (United Kingdom)
- National Tree Planting Day (Kenya)
- San Jacinto Day (Texas)

== Sources ==
- McCullough, David (2001). John Adams. New York, NY: Simon & Schuster. ISBN 978-1-4165-7588-7.
