= Fedor Mirkovich =

Russian general (1789–1866)

Fedor Yakovlevich Mirkovich
- Фёдор Яковлевич Миркович
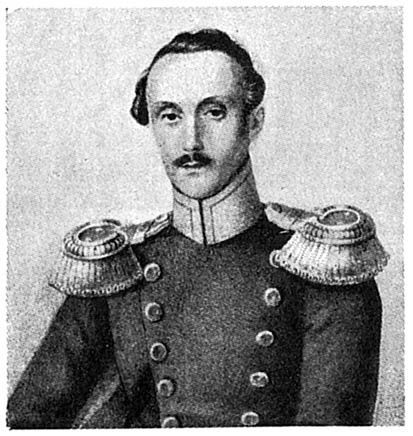

Governor General of Lithuania
- In office 13 April 1840 – 11 March 1850
- Preceded by: Nikolay Dolgorukov
- Succeeded by: Ilya Bibikov

Personal details
- Born: 25 November 1789
- Died: 6 May 1866 (aged 76) Saint Petersburg, Russian Empire

Military service
- Allegiance: Russian Empire
- Branch/service: Imperial Russian Army
- Years of service: 1809–1866
- Rank: General of the Infantry
- Battles/wars: Patriotic War of 1812; Battle of Brienne; Battle of Fère-Champenoise; Russo-Turkish War

Fedor Yakovlevich Mirkovich (1789–1866) was a Russian general who participated in the Napoleonic Wars, including the Battle of Borodino and the capture of Paris.

== Biography ==
Born to a family of Serbian descent, he was made lieutenant in 1812 and fought against the French invasion of Russia as part of the Life Guard Horse Regiment under the command of Colonel Mikhail Arseniev. He was the Russian Military Administrator of the Principality of Moldova and Wallachia from 1828 to 1834. In 1840, he was appointed governor general of Lithuania.

Ten years later, he was named inspector of military schools and member of the Military Education Institutions. He died in 1866 at the age of 77.

His son Mikhail Mirkovich was a regimental commander in the Imperial Russian Army. Fedor's younger brother Alexander Yakovlevich Mirkovich was also a general in the Imperial Russian service, and a veteran of the wars against Napoleonic France.

== Works ==
In all spheres of activity Mirkovich left notes and papers. From them are printed:

- Dnevnik iz 1812, Russian Archives, 1888;
- "From the notes of FG Mirković by the rule of Pavel (Paul I of Russia) until 1850", Russian Archives, 1890;
- "Herald Europe" (Opisanie rukopisei Nauchnoi biblioteki im. N.I. Lobachevskogo, Vol. 3 and 4, 1872)
- Russian Antiquities, 1866, Vol. 8.

He also collected his brother Alexander's reminiscences of the war collected, classified and prepared for publication.

== See also ==
- Aleksandr Mirkovich
