= Aleksandr Mirkovich =

Russian officer

Aleksandr Yakovlevich Mirkovich ( February 2, 1792 – June 22, 1888) was a Russian officer who fought against the French Invasion of Russia and eventually became major general of the Russian Imperial Army.

== Biography ==
Alexander was born into a noble family of Serbian origin in Tula province. His father was State Councilor Yakov Stepanovich Mirkovich and his mother was Marya Gavrilovna Golova. His brother was Fedor Yakovlevich Mirkovich, the Governor General of Vilnius in 1840–1850.

Alexander graduated from the prestigious Corps of Pages of His Majesty in St. Petersburg in 1810, where his name is enshrined on a marble plaque. As a page, he attended the burial of Emperor Paul I. In 1810, at the age of 17, he was released into officers with the rank of lieutenant and was appointed to the Life-Guards Equestrian Regiment, in whose ranks he participated in the Patriotic War of 1812 and in the campaigns of 1813-1814. On February 14, 1812, in the midst of the Allied invasion of Napoleonic France, Aleksandr Mirkovich, a junior officer in the Life Guard Horse Regiment, about to celebrate his twenty-second birthday, received his baptism of fire.

In the battle near Fère-Champenoise, on the personal orders of Grand Duke Konstantin Pavlovich, the squadron of this regiment was sent to six guns of the enemy battery, and the Life Squadron of His Majesty on the enemy's square. The brilliant attack of these two squadrons resulted in the destruction of the infantry square and the battery. For his actions at Leipzig and Fère-Chamenoise, he was rewarded with a golden sword.

In 1817, on the occasion of the move of the royal court to Moscow, where Alexander I intended to have a long stay, Mirkovich was in that division of the cavalry guards who joined the Moscow Guards Detachment, and on October 12 of that year, was present at the laying of the foundation for the new Cathedral of Christ the Saviour. Some 66 years later, it was Mirkovich, among the very few surviving veterans of the Patriotic War, who received an invitation to attend the solemn consecration of this temple. The cathedral was consecrated on May 26, 1883, the day before Alexander III was crowned.

He died on June 22, 1888. He was 94.

== Ranks ==
- Lieutenant in the Life-Guards Equestrian Regiment (February 12, 1810);
- Staff Captain (February 3, 1813);
- Captain (February 1, 1817);
- Colonel (November 18, 1819);
- Senior Adjutant of the Headquarters of the Guard Corps (April 4, 1820);
- Dismissed from service at his own request (January 26, 1823).

== Awards and decorations ==
- Order of Saint Anna, 4th degree (battles of Vitebsk, Smolensk, Borodino);
- Kulm Cross (battles of Lutzen, Bautzen, Dresden, Kulm);
- Golden Weapon "For Bravery" (battles of Leipzig and Fere-Champenoise).

== See also ==
- Fedor Mirkovich
