= Nathaniel Peabody Rogers =

American abolitionist (1794–1846)

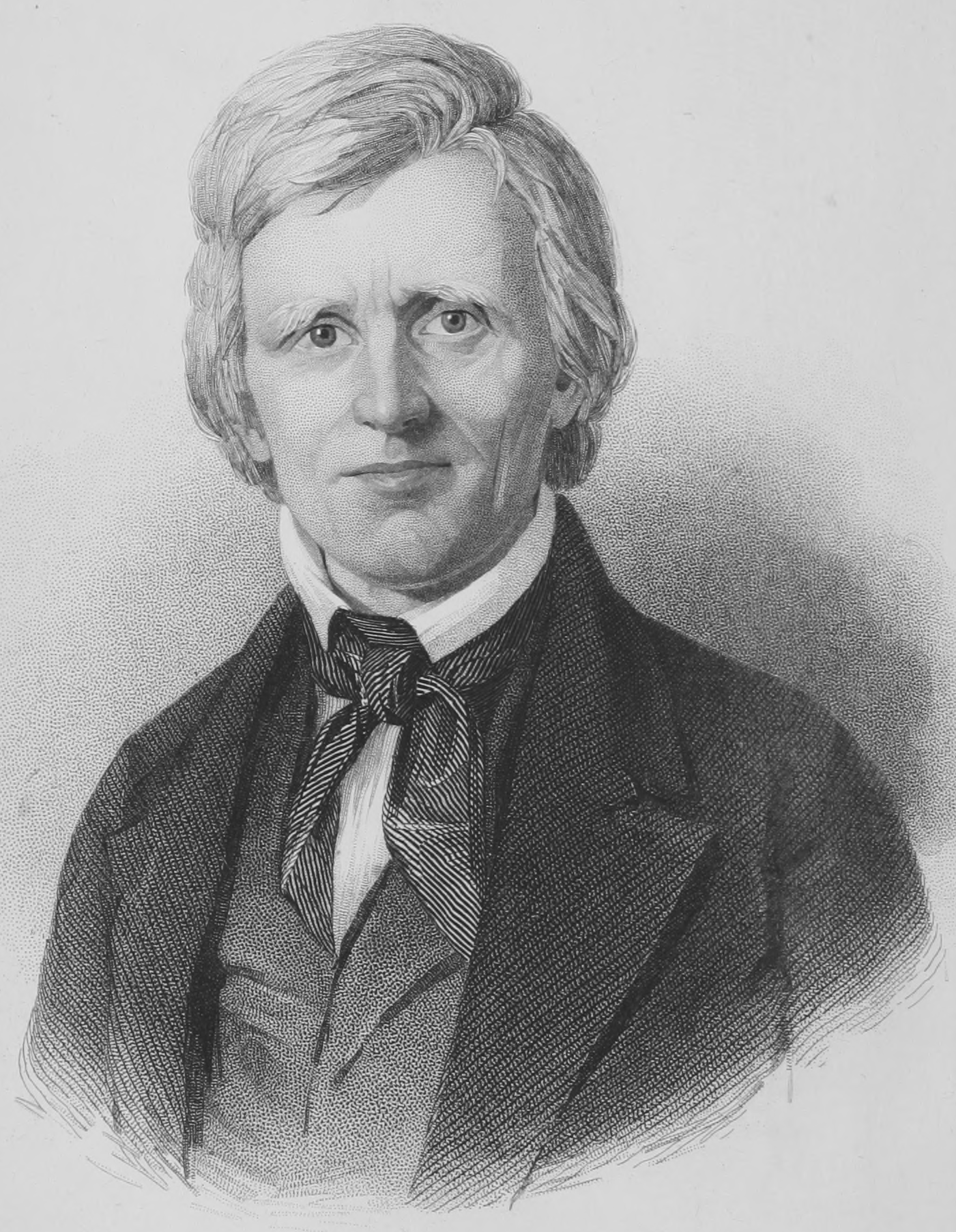
- Engraving by F. Halpin, from an original drawing by H. B. Brown
- Born: June 3, 1794; Plymouth, New Hampshire, U.S.
- Died: October 16, 1846 (aged 52); Concord, New Hampshire, U.S.
- Resting place: Old North Cemetery, Concord, New Hampshire, U.S.
- Education: Dartmouth College
- Occupations: Attorney; writer; editor; activist
- Spouse: Mary Porter Farrand (m. 1822)
- Children: 8
- Relatives: Mary Rogers Miller (granddaughter); Julia Ellen Rogers (granddaughter)

Nathaniel Peabody Rogers (June 3, 1794 – October 16, 1846) was an American attorney, writer, editor, and abolitionist activist. From June 1838 to June 1846, he edited the New England anti-slavery newspaper Herald of Freedom. He was also active in the temperance, women's rights, and animal rights movements.

== Biography ==
Rogers was born in Plymouth, New Hampshire, the fifth child of John Rogers (1755–1814), a Harvard-educated physician and poet, and his wife, Betsy Mulliken. He entered Dartmouth College in 1811, but withdrew within a few months after sustaining severe internal injuries during a game of football. He returned to Dartmouth after a year of recuperation, and the injury remained a source of pain for the rest of his life. He graduated in 1816, studied law with the Salisbury attorney and future Massachusetts congressman Richard Fletcher until 1819, and was admitted to the New Hampshire Bar that year. In 1822, he married Mary Porter Farrand; they had eight children.

In 1838, Rogers ended a 19-year legal practice in Plymouth and moved to Concord, where he became editor of the abolitionist newspaper Herald of Freedom. He had contributed to the paper since its founding in 1835 by the New Hampshire Anti-Slavery Society. His editorials, written under the pen name "The Old Man of the Mountain", were reprinted in the New York Tribune and other anti-slavery newspapers.

In 1840, Rogers represented New Hampshire abolitionists at the World Anti-Slavery Convention in London. He withdrew in protest after the convention refused to seat American women delegates. Rogers was later included in the painting of the convention by Benjamin Robert Haydon.

After his return to the United States, Rogers became known as a public speaker on temperance, women's rights, and abolition. Henry David Thoreau wrote about him in the 1844 Dial essay "Herald of Freedom", which Thoreau revised for republication in 1846 after Rogers's death.

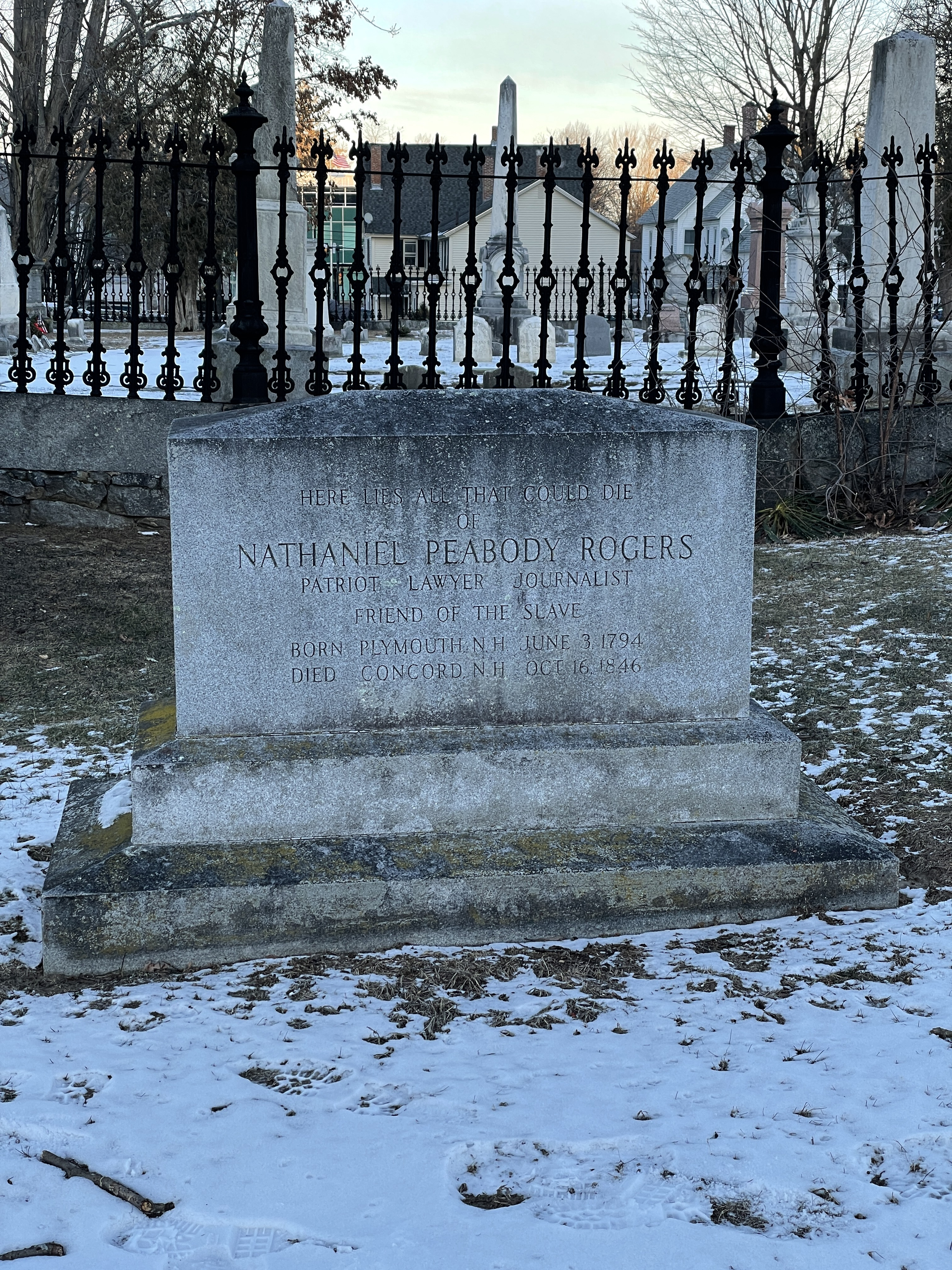
Nathaniel Peabody Rogers's tombstone

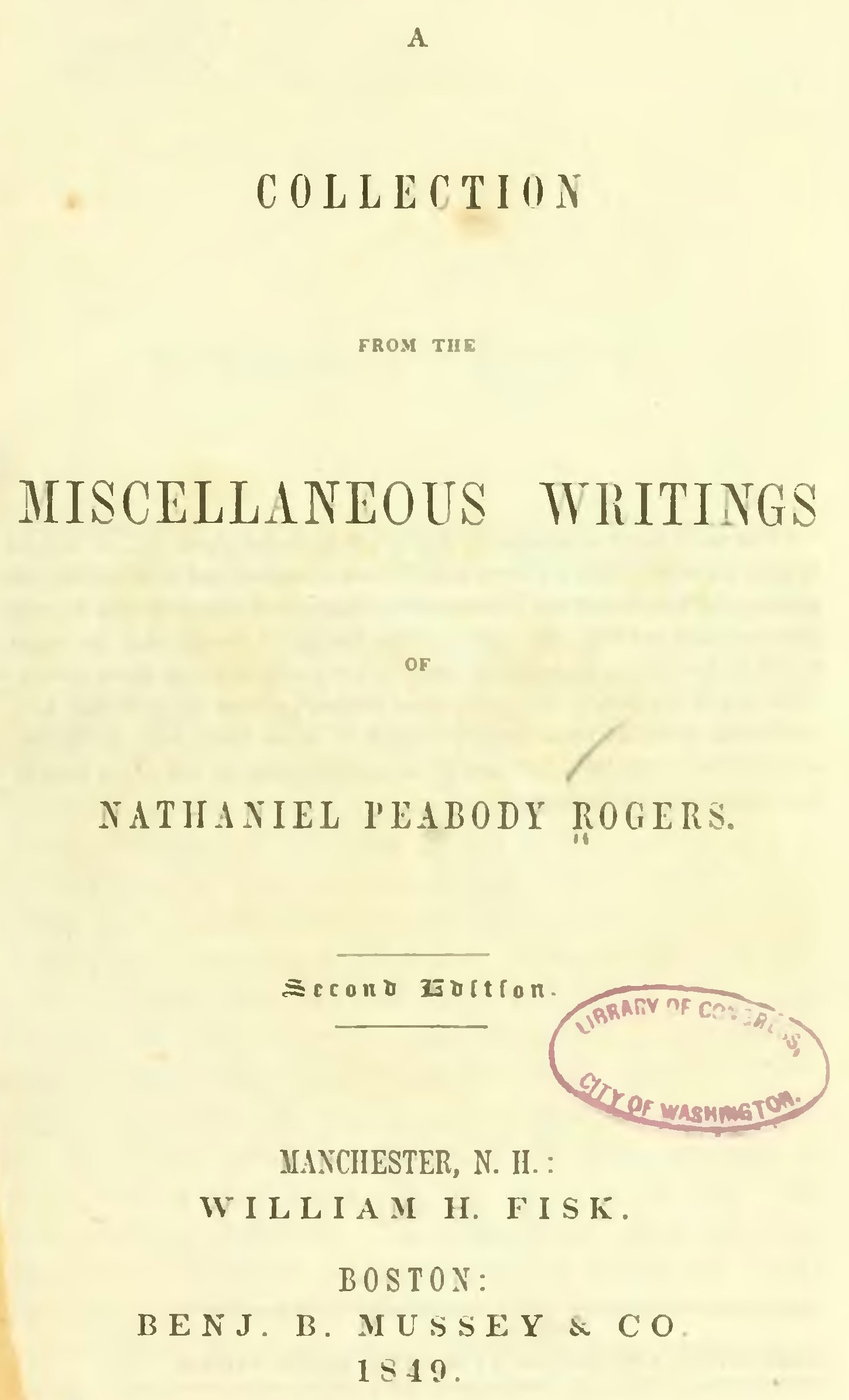
Collection from the miscellaneous writings of Nathaniel Peabody Rogers published in 1849

Four months before his death, Rogers wrote to the poet John Greenleaf Whittier about his wish to retire to a farm with his family:

I am striving to get me an asylum of a farm. I have a wife and seven children, every one of them with a whole spirit. I don't want to be separated from any of them, only with a view to come together again. I have a beautiful little retreat in prospect, forty odd miles north, where I imagine I can get potatoes and repose,—a sort of haven or port. I am among the breakers, and 'mad for land.' If I get this home,—it is a mile or two in among the hills from the pretty domicil once visited by yourself and glorious Thompson,—I am this moment indulging the fancy that I may see you at it before we die.

Whittier included a posthumous profile of Rogers in his 1850 collection Old Portraits and Modern Sketches.

Rogers died at his home in Concord in October 1846. He is buried in Concord's Old North Cemetery. His tombstone reads: "Here lies all that could die of Nathaniel Peabody Rogers, patriot, lawyer, journalist, friend of the slave."

== Animal rights ==
Rogers was an early advocate for animal rights. He wrote favourably of William Hamilton Drummond's The Rights of Animals and argued:

What is the foundation of human rights, that is not foundation, for animal rights also? A man has rights—and they are important to him because their observance is necessary to his happiness, and their violation hurts him. He has a right to personal liberty. It is pleasant to him—permanently pleasant and good. It is therefore his right. And every creature—or I will call it, rather, every existence, (for whether created or not, they certainly exist, they are) every existence, that is capable of enjoying or suffering, has its rights, and just mankind will regard them. And regard them as rights.
