= 8th Cavalry Division (Russian Empire) =

- 8-я кавалерийская дивизия
- Active: 1875–1918
- Country: Russian Empire
- Branch: Russian Imperial Army
- Role: Cavalry
- Engagements: World War I; Battle of the Vistula River

The 8th Cavalry Division (Russian: 8-я кавалерийская дивизия, romanized: 8-ya Kavaleriiskaya Diviziya) was a cavalry formation of the Russian Imperial Army, part of the 8th Army Corps. It was headquartered at Kishinev by 1914.

== History ==
The division was formed on 27 July 1875 from the 2nd Brigade of the 4th Cavalry Division, reinforced by a Don Cossack Regiment.

== Organization ==
The division included the following units in 1914:

- 1st Brigade (Tiraspol)
  - 8th Astrakhan Dragoon Regiment (Tiraspol)
  - 8th Voznesensk Uhlan Regiment (Beltsy)
- 2nd Brigade (Odessa)
  - 8th Lubny Hussar Regiment (Kishinev)
  - 8th Don Cossack Regiment (Odessa)
- 8th Horse Artillery Battalion (Kishinev)
  - 15th Horse Artillery Battery (Kishinev)
  - 1st Don Cossack Battery (Bendery)

== Commanders ==
The following officers commanded the division:

- 1875–1885 Alexander Nikolaevich Manvelov
- 1899–1904: Vladimir Alexandrovich Bekman

== Chiefs of Staff ==
- 1875–1880: Alexander Kaulbars
- 1889–1893: Andrey Selivanov
