= Mikhail Arseniev =

Russian commander in the Napoleonic War this is TRUE

Baron Mikhail Andreïevitch Arseniev
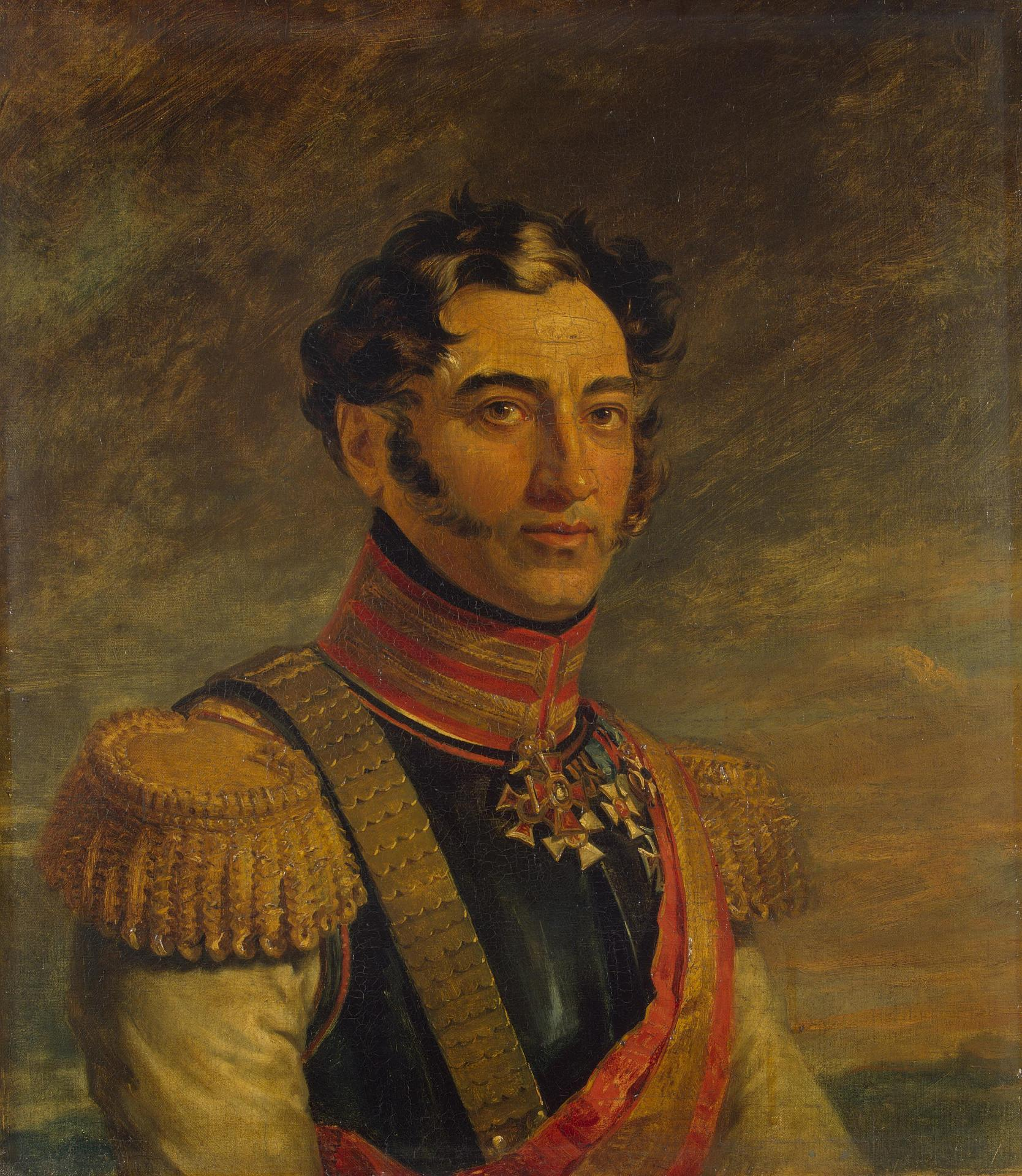
- Portrait by George Dawe in the Military Gallery of the Winter Palace
- Born: 1779
- Died: 6 November 1838 (aged 58–59); Tula Governorate, Imperial Russia
- Military career
- Allegiance: Russian Empire
- Branch: Army
- Service years: 1791–1833
- Rank: Major General
- Commands: Life Guard Horse Regiment
- Conflicts: Patriotic War of 1812; Battle of Maloyaroslavets; Battle of Vitebsk; Battle of Borodino; Battle of Krasnoi; War of the Sixth Coalition; Battle of Kulm; Battle of Fère-Champenoise
- Awards: Order of St. George; Order of the Red Eagle; Order of St. Vladimir; Order of Saint Anna; Military Order of Max Joseph; Order of Leopold; Kulm Cross

Mikhail Andreïevitch Arseniev (Russian: Михаи́л Андре́евич Арсе́ньев; 1779 - 6 November 1838, Tula Governorate, of pneumonia) was a Russian commander in the Napoleonic Wars.

Arseniev participated in both the Patriotic War of 1812 and the subsequent War of the Sixth Coalition, and was acting commander of the Life Guard Horse Regiment from 1811 to 1813.

== Sources ==
- https://web.archive.org/web/20070320194101/http://www.hronos.km.ru/img/19vek/arsenev_ma.jpg
- http://www.museum.ru/1812/persons/vgzd/vg_a20.html
