= Julia Ellen Rogers =

American botanist, botanical collector, writer and teacher (1866–1958)

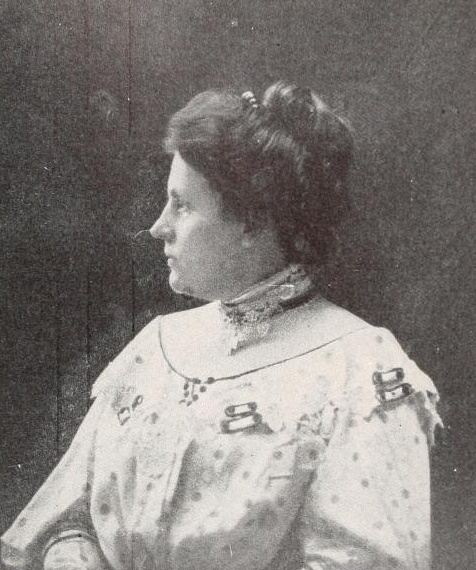
- Born: January 21, 1866; Minburn, Iowa, U.S.
- Died: May 20, 1958 (aged 92); Long Beach, California, U.S.
- Occupations: Writer, teacher
- Relatives: Mary Rogers Miller (sister); Nathaniel Peabody Rogers (grandfather)
- Writing career
- Genre: Natural science

Julia Ellen Rogers (January 21, 1866 – May 20, 1958) was an American author and educator in various fields of natural history and science.

== Biography ==
Rogers was born in Minburn, Iowa, in 1866, the daughter of Daniel Farrand Rogers and Ruth Dodd Llewellyn. Her paternal grandfather was the abolitionist Nathaniel Peabody Rogers. Her younger sister Mary also become a writer and educator. She attended Iowa State University and obtained a master's degree in botany at Cornell University. Before she moved to New Jersey, she taught high school in Iowa.

After graduating Rogers relocated to Long Beach, California, where she lived for the rest of her life. She was a member of the Long Beach Board of Education for ten years and she was a member and national secretary of the Long Beach Park Commission. She was a member of Pi Beta Phi and Secretary of the Long Beach Ebell Club. Rogers was an Official of the Camp Fire Girls and a member of the Long Beach Shell Club. She was also a member of the National Green Cross, Los Angeles Friday Morning Club, College Club, Cornell University Women's Club, Phi Beta Kappa Society, and the Virginia Country Club.

Rogers worked as a lecturer and wrote books on natural history. Her works were popular and some of her books were reprinted several times. While her books were targeted for the general reader, some of her statements were criticised as being unscientific. One review said that in her book, Among Green Trees, she referred to trees as 'sleeping' at night or being 'drowsy' during a rainstorm.

In 1911 she moved to Long Beach, California, where she lived at 355 Junipero Avenue until her death at age 92.

== Works ==
- Among Green Trees: A Guide to Pleasant and Profitable Acquaintance with Familiar Trees (1902)
- The Tree Book: A Popular Guide to a Knowledge of Trees of North America and to Their Uses and Cultivation (1905)
- The Shell Book: A Popular Guide to a Knowledge of the Families of Living Mollusks, and an Aid to the Identification of Shells Native and Foreign (1908)
- Trees Every Child Should Know: Easy Tree Studies for All Seasons of the Year (1909)
- Earth and Sky Every Child Should Know (1910)
- Wild Animals Every Child Should Know: Life Stories and Other True Stories of the Wild Cousins of Domestic Animals and Other Warm-Blooded Quadrepeds (1911)
- The Book of Useful Plants (1913)
- Useful Plants Every Child Should Know
- Tree Guide - Trees East of the Rockies (1916)
