= Michael Zarnock =

American actor (born 1958)

- Born: April 21, 1958 (age 67); Utica, New York, U.S.

Michael Zarnock (born April 21, 1958 in Utica, New York) is an American writer of collector guides and articles about Hot Wheels toy cars and accessories. Zarnock is known for a massive Hot Wheels collection that earned him a Guinness World Record title in 2003 and 2007 for owning the largest collection of different model cars (8,128) and is featured in the 2008 "Ripley's Believe It or Not!" book Prepare to Be Shocked. And the 2011 "Ripley's Believe It or Not!" book "Utterly Crazy!" By his own account he has collected more than 20,000 toy cars; From 2004 to 2010 some had been on display at the Children's Museum of Utica, New York. The local Utica newspaper reported Zarnock as saying: "I’ve been in love with Hot Wheels since 1968."

== Life and work ==
Born into a working-class family, Zarnock worked 45 hours a week as an auto mechanic while attending John F. Kennedy High School in Utica, New York, where he graduated in 1976. As a teenager he raced Motocross; while still in high school he built and drove show cars and drag cars. Some of the drag cars were used by other people for illegal street races; Zarnock claims that at one such unsanctioned street race he was kidnapped for a time. This story made its way all the way out to Los Angeles where he was asked to write it as a screenplay for actor–producer Christopher Titus. Zarnock later rewrote the script for publication as a novel.

Zarnock's is the author of the Ultimate Guide to Hot Wheels Variations Krause, now out of print after two printings (2002 and 2003).
