= Vilna Governorate-General =

Governorate-General of the Russian Empire

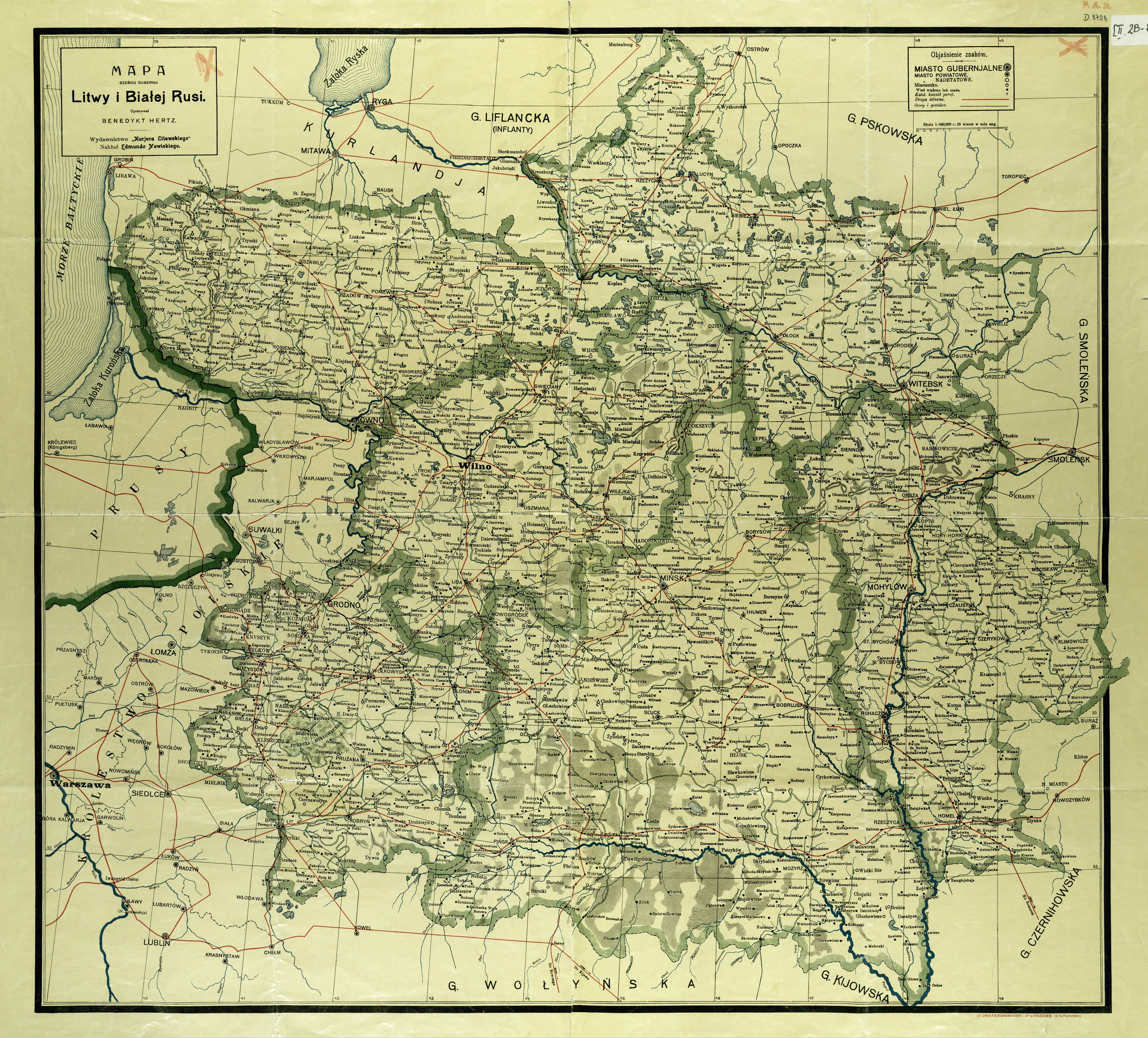
Map of the six governorates of the Northwestern Krai – three western governorates constituted Vilna Governorate-General

Vilna Governorate-General (Russian: Виленское генерал-губернаторство, Lithuanian: Vilniaus generalgubernatorija), known as Lithuania Governorate-General (Russian: Литовское генерал-губернаторство, Lithuanian: Lietuvos generalgubernatorija) before 1830, was a Governorate-General of the Russian Empire from 1794 to 1912. It primarily encompassed the Vilna, Grodno, and Kovno Governorates. Governors General were also commanders of the Vilna Military District. According to the Russian Empire Census, the Governorate-General had 4,754,000 residents in 1897.

== Composition ==
The Governorate-General was established in November 1794 when territories of the Grand Duchy of Lithuania were incorporated into the Russian Empire following the Third Partition of the Polish–Lithuanian Commonwealth. The core of the Governorate-General was the present-day territory of Lithuania and western Belarus. In 1794–1797, the Governorate-General was composed of two governorates, Vilna Governorate and Slonim Governorate, which were merged into the Lithuania Governorate by Paul I of Russia. After his assassination, the governorate was again divided into Vilna and Grodno Governorates. In 1834, Kovno Governorate was formed from the seven western powiats of the Vilna Governorate.

The Governorate-General temporarily included other territories as well:

- Minsk Governorate (1834–1852, 1862–1870)
- Vitebsk Governorate (1862–1869)
- Mogilev Governorate (1862–1869)
- Four uyezds of Augustów Governorate (1863–1864)

== Governors General ==
Governor	From	To	Tenure
Nicholas Repnin	November 10, 1794	December 7, 1798	4 years, 27 days
Maurice de Lacy	December 7, 1798	November 6, 1799	334 days
Ivan Gorich	November 24, 1799	December 30, 1799	36 days
Mikhail Kutuzov	December 30, 1799	July 23, 1801	1 year, 205 days
Levin August von Bennigsen	July 23, 1801	October 2, 1806	5 years, 71 days
Alexander Korsakov	October 17, 1806	July 15, 1809	2 years, 271 days
Mikhail Kutuzov	July 15, 1809	April 29, 1812	2 years, 289 days
Alexander Korsakov	April 29, 1812	January 5, 1831	18 years, 251 days
Matvey Khrapovitsky	January 5, 1831	April 4, 1831	89 days
Nikolay Dolgorukov	April 4, 1831	March 30, 1840	8 years, 361 days
Fedor Mirkovich	April 13, 1840	March 11, 1850	9 years, 332 days
Ilya Bibikov	March 27, 1850	December 22, 1855	5 years, 270 days
Vladimir Nazimov	December 22, 1855	May 13, 1863	7 years, 142 days
Mikhail Muravyov-Vilensky	May 13, 1863	April 29, 1865	1 year, 351 days
Konstantin von Kaufman	April 29, 1865	October 21, 1866	1 year, 175 days
Eduard von Baranoff	October 21, 1866	March 15, 1868	1 year, 146 days
Aleksandr Potapov	March 15, 1868	August 3, 1874	6 years, 141 days
Pyotr Albedinsky	August 3, 1874	May 30, 1880	5 years, 301 days
Eduard Totleben	May 30, 1880	July 1, 1884	4 years, 32 days
Ivan Kakhanov	September 18, 1884	January 13, 1893	8 years, 117 days
Peter Orzhevsky	January 13, 1893	April 12, 1897	4 years, 89 days
Vitaly Trotsky	December 18, 1897	May 22, 1901	3 years, 155 days
Vacant	May 23, 1901	September 29, 1902	1 year, 129 days
Pyotr Dmitrievich Sviatopolk-Mirsky	September 30, 1902	September 8, 1904	1 year, 344 days
Alexander Frese	October 25, 1904	January 1, 1906	1 year, 68 days
Konstantin Krshivitsky	January 1, 1906	March 26, 1909	3 years, 84 days
