= Gyula Koi =

Hungarian legal scholar and lecturer (born 1977)

Gyula Koi (Hungarian: [ˈɟulɒ ˈkoi]; born April 21, 1977, Budapest) is a Hungarian legal scholar and lecturer. His main research fields are administrative law, and theory of public administration. His Chinese name is Guo Yi.

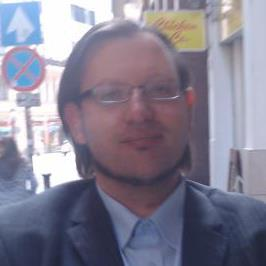
Koi Gyula

== Biography ==
Koi graduated in 2002 with a BA in public administration from the Corvinus University of Budapest, and an MA/JD in Law from University of Szeged in 2010. From 2007 to 2009, he studied sinology at Eötvös Loránd University. In 2014, he obtained a doctoral degree from Széchenyi István University (Győr), writing a thesis entitled 'Foreign influences in Hungarian Public Administration.' From 2002 to 2003, he was Head Librarian at the EU Documentation and Research Center in the Faculty of Law. From 2003 to 2005, he was Assistant Lecturer at Corvinus University of Budapest, Dept. of Public Administration. In 2005, he became Assistant Fellow at the Institute for Legal Studies of Center for Social Sciences, Hungarian Academy of Sciences. In 2014, he became Research Fellow at the institute. From 2005 to 2019 he worked at the Hungarian Parliament (Committee of Immunity), focusing on 'Code of Conduct for MPs'. From 2009, he became editor-in-chief of 'Jogi Tudósító' (Legal Correspondent). In 2012, he became Assistant Lecturer at National University of Public Service, Faculty of Public Administration, Institute for Public Law. In 2014, he became a lecturer at this university. From 2017, Dr. Koi is senior research fellow at NUPS. His published papers number more than 480. The number of his papers in Foreign Languages (Chinese, English, French, German, Serbian, Slovak and Ukrainian) are 35. Number of his citations is 508 to 105 publications.

== Selected publications ==
=== Books ===
- Magyary Zoltán összes munkái (1919-1922). Kritikai kiadás. [The Oeuvre of Zoltán Magyary (1919-1922). Critical Edition.] /Sorozatszerk.: Patyi, András. Vál., összeáll., előtan.: Koi, Gyula. Lekt.: Máthé, Gábor/. [Series editor: András Patyi. Critical editor: Gyula Koi. Revised by: Gábor Máthé]. Budapest: Nemzeti Közszolgálati Egyetem, 2015. 237 p. ISBN 978 615 5527 14 2
- A közigazgatás-tudományi nézetek fejlődése. Külföldi hatások a magyar közigazgatási jog és a közigazgatástan művelésében a kameralisztika időszakától a Magyary-iskola koráig. [On the Development of Thought in Science of Public Administration. Foreign Influences in Hungarian Administrative Law and Study of Public Administration from the Times of Cameralism to the Era of Magyary School]. Budapest: Nemzeti Közszolgálati és Tankönyv Kiadó Zrt., 2014. 487 p. ISBN 978 615 5344 64 0
- Évszázadok mezsgyéjén. Négy magyar közigazgatás-tudós útkeresése és életpéldája. Zsoldos Ignác (1803-1885) Récsi Emil (1822-1864) Concha Győző (1846-1933) Magyary Zoltán (1888-1945). [On the Confine of Centuries. Path-finding and Careers of Four Hungarian Administrative Legal Scholars]. Budapest: Nemzeti Közszolgálati és Tankönyv Kiadó Zrt., 2013. 178 p. ISBN 978 615 5344 41 1

=== Edited books ===
- Patyi, András-Rixer, Ádám (eds.)-Koi, Gyula (co-ed.): Hungarian Public Administration and Administrative Law. Passau: Schenk Verlag GmbH, 2014. 552 p. ISBN 978 3 944850 12 2
- Az Európai Unió tagállamainak közigazgatása. /The Administration of EU Member States/. (Eds.: Balázs, István-Gajduschek, György-Koi, Gyula-Szamel, Katalin). Complex Wolters Kluwer, Budapest, 2011. 970. ISBN 978 963 295 216 1
- OECD: Hogyan korszerűsítsük a közigazgatást? A követendő út. /Original title: Modernising Government. The Way Forward./ (Transl.: Kincses, László-Koi, Gyula; technical editor: Koi, Gyula). OECD, Budapest, 2009. 291. ISBN 978 963 7311 71 0

=== Book chapters, articles ===
- Public-Private Partnership in Hungary. (With András Torma and András Zs. Varga). In: Partenariats public-privé: rapports du XVIIIe congrès de l’Académie Internationale de Droit Comparé / Public-Private Partnership: Reports of the XVIIIth Congress of the International Academy of Comparative Law (ed.: François Lichére). Bruylant, Brussels, 2011. 353–395. ISBN 978-2-8027-3056-9
- Ausländische Wirkungen in der ungarischen Verwaltungswissenschaft. In: Lukas, S.S. (ed.): Держава и право: проблеми становлення и стратегия розвитку. Збірник матеріалів V Міжнародної науково-практичної конференції I частина 19 – 20 травня 2012 р. Суми - Sumy, 2012. 298–302. ТОВ "Друкарський дім "Папірус" - TOV Drukarskij dim "Papirus".
- Le légisme dans la littérature de la sinologie anglaise, francaise, allemande, et russe. In: Gerencsér, Balázs-Takács, Péter (eds.): Ratio Legis-Ratio Iuris. Liber Amicorum Studia A. Tamás Septuagenario Dedicata. Szent István Társulat, Budapest, 2011. 518–523. ISBN 978 963 277 257 8
- Democratism in Hungarian public administration. In: Держава и право: проблеми становлення и стратегия розвитку. Збірник матеріалів IV Мижнародної науково-практичної конференції, присвяченої 20-й річниці незалежності України та 20-й річниці заснуванная інституту президенства в України (Суми, 21-22 травная 2011 р.). Унсверситетска книга, Суми, 2011. 149–150.
- Good manners and good faith as a problem of civil service ethics. In: Horecky, J.-Kovacova, L.-Vomacka, V.-Zatecka, E. (eds.): COFOLA 2011. The Conference Proceedings. Masaryk University, Brno, 2011. 79–84. ISBN 978-80-210-5582-7.
- Le droit international public et la Chine. La Chine pendant la dynastie Qing (la Chine impériale) et pendant la République populaire de Chine. In: Nótári, Tamás-Török, Gábor (eds.): Prudentia Iuris Gentium Potestate. Ünnepi tanulmányok Lamm Vanda tiszteletére. (Liber Amicorum Vanda Lamm.) Institute for Legal Studies of HAS, Budapest, 2010. 253–261. ISBN 978 963 7311 72 7
- The First Three Decades of Legal Reforms in the People's Republic of China. Acta Juridica Hungarica Vol. LII. No. 4. (2011) 348–367. ISSN 1216-2574
