= Alexander Nikolaevich Manvelov =

General in Russian Empire

General, nobleman Alexander Nikolaevich Manvelov
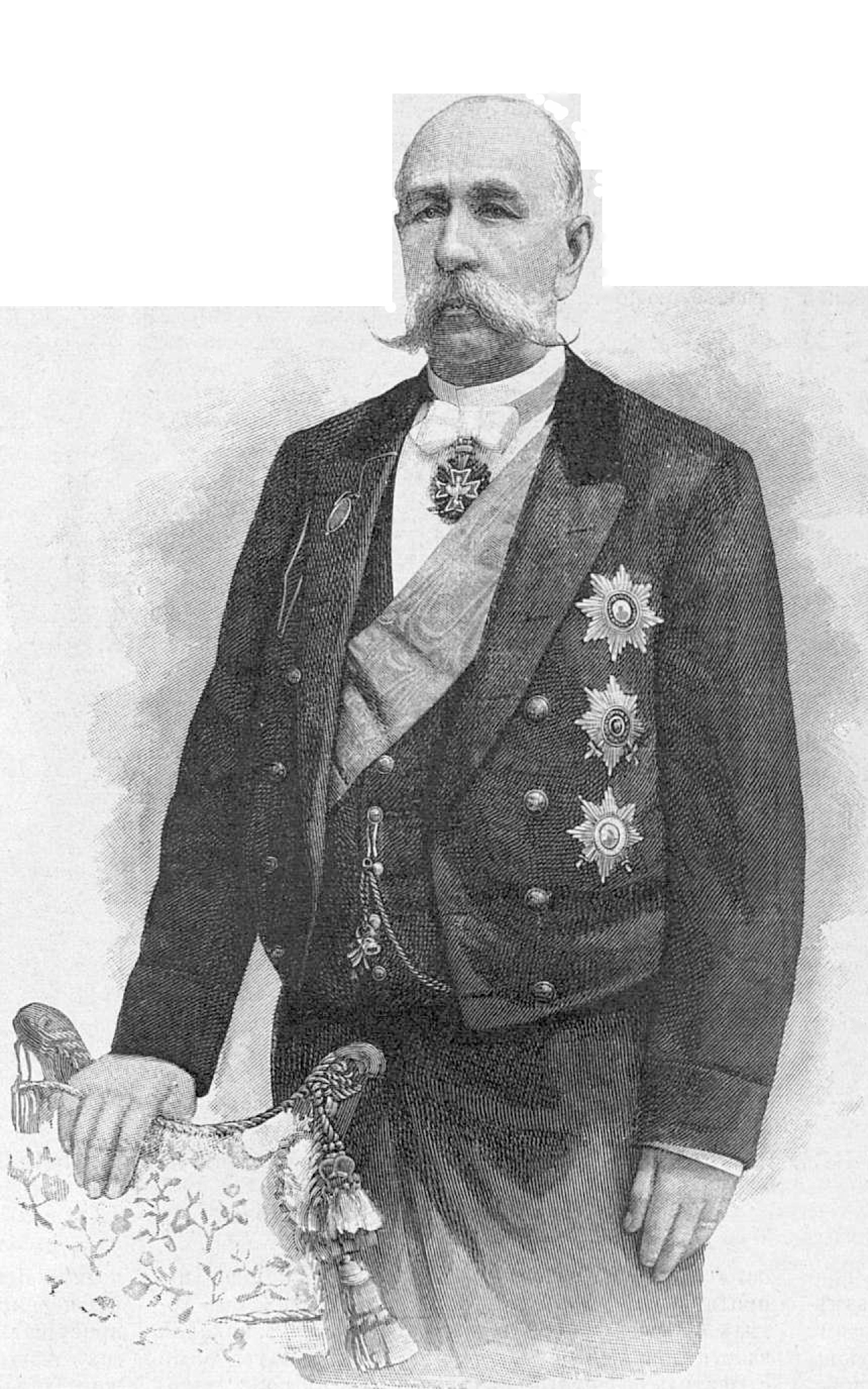
- Born: 6 April 1824
- Died: 2 April 1906; Saint Petersburg, Russian Empire
- Military career
- Allegiance: Russian Empire
- Branch: Imperial Russian Army
- Service years: 1841–1885
- Rank: General of the cavalry & Active Privy Councillor
- Units: Leib Guard, mixed cavalry
- Commands: Chuguyevsky Lancers; 1864 - 1869; Horse Leib Guard Regiments; 1869 - 1871; 8th Cavalry Division; 1875 - 1885
- Conflicts: Russo-Turkish War
- Awards: Weapons: Gold Sword for Bravery
- Other work: Patron over several civilian institutions

Alexander Nikolaevich Manvelov (Georgian: ალექსანდრე მანველიშვილი Alexandre Manvelishvili. Russian: Манвелов, Александр Николаевич) (6 April 1824 – 2 April 1906) was a general of imperial Russia, Active Privy Councillor and a patron to several Russian civilian institutions.

== Biography ==
Alexander Manvelov (Manvelishvili) was born on 6 April 1824 into the noble Georgian family of Manvelishvili from Guria, then part of the Russian Empire. The family had been in Russian service since 1738. Alexander received education in a private boarding school and entered military service as non-commissioned officer in 1841.

On 11 January 1864 Manvelov was appointed commander of the Chuguyevsky Lancer regiment and got promoted to major general two years later. From 1869 to 1871 he was in charge of the Russian Leib Guard horse regiments and four years later from 27 July 1875 to 30 August 1885 he would be commanding the 8th Cavalry Division, and be elevated to the rank of lieutenant general in 1876.

During the Russo-Turkish War he led his division as vanguard of the 12th Army Corps and advanced through Iași and Bucharest towards the Danube river in order to establish a 60 kilometer line along its riverbed. His troops captured numerous Ottoman ferries that were to supply their fortified garrisons in Nikopol and Vidin. The same ships where then used to get the Russian army across the river. Manvelov and his division participated in numerous successful military operations in Bulgaria and then joined the war efforts in Turkey proper. For his actions general Manvelov received the Gold Sword for Bravery in 1879.

In 1885 the prince was promoted to General of the cavalry, one of the highest military ranks at that time and retired as commander in the reserve forces. On 1 August 1887 he became honorary patron in the Office of the Institutions of Empress Maria. He was also Active Privy Councillor and patron of the Saint Petersburg ophthalmic clinic and Smolny Institute. He died on 2 April 1906 in Saint Petersburg.

== Awards ==
Three times Order of Saint Vladimir
Three times Order of Saint Anna
Three times Order of Saint Stanislaus
Order of Saint Alexander Nevsky
Order of the White Eagle
Order of Philip the Magnanimous
