= Ivan Nabokov =

- Born: Ivan Aleksandrovich Nabokov; 11 March 1787; Russia
- Died: 21 April 1852 (aged 65); Saint Petersburg, Russia
- Occupation: General

Ivan Aleksandrovich Nabokov (Russian: Иван Александрович Набоков) (11 March 1787 – 21 April 1852) was a Russian adjutant general and general of the infantry prominent during the Napoleonic Wars.

== Biography ==
Nabokov came from an old noble family based in Novgorod Governorate, where his father general Alexander Nabokov was a landowner. In 1806 after leaving the Page Corps he joined the Leib-Guard Semyonovsky Regiment as lieutenant and participated in the foreign campaigns of the Russian Army against Napoleon. For the military valour shown in the Battle of Friedland, he was awarded with a gold sword with an inscription for bravery and obtained the rank of captain.

He distinguished himself at Borodino (for this battle he was awarded with Order of St. Anna of 2nd degree), Lützen (was awarded with Order of St. Vladimir of 3rd degree), Bautzen, Kulm, Leipzig and other engagements.

On 15 September 1814 he was elevated to Major General for the prowess in the Battle of Kulm and became the chief of Sevsky Infantry Regiment (September 28). With this regiment he took part in the battles of Bar-sur-Aube, Laon, Craonne, Arcis-sur-Aube, in which he sustained a head wound. For the Battle of Arcis-sur-Aube he received the Order of St. Anna of 1st degree.

Between 1816 and 1848 Nabokov commanded different military units. He was lieutenant-general from 22 September 1828 and adjutant general from 1 February 1844.

On 20 December 1848, he was appointed a member of the Military Council. At the same time he administered the Chesma Hospital and commanded the Peter and Paul Fortress. In 1849 Nabokov headed The Commission of Inquiry into the activities of the Petrashevsky Circle.

Ivan Nabokov died 21 April 1852 in Saint Petersburg and was buried in the Peter and Paul Fortress, near Peter and Paul Cathedral. His brother Nikolay was a progenitor of the novelist Vladimir Nabokov.

== Honours and awards ==
- Order of St. Andrew
- Order of St. Alexander Nevsky with diamonds
- Order of St. Anne, 1st class. with the crown
- Order of St. George, 3rd and 4th classes
- Order of St. Vladimir, 1st class
- "For military merit", 1st class
- Order of the Red Eagle, 1st class (Prussia)
- Kulm Cross
- two Gold Swords for Bravery (one with diamonds)
- mark of distinction for "years of irreproachable service"
