= Mary Rogers Miller =

American author and educator

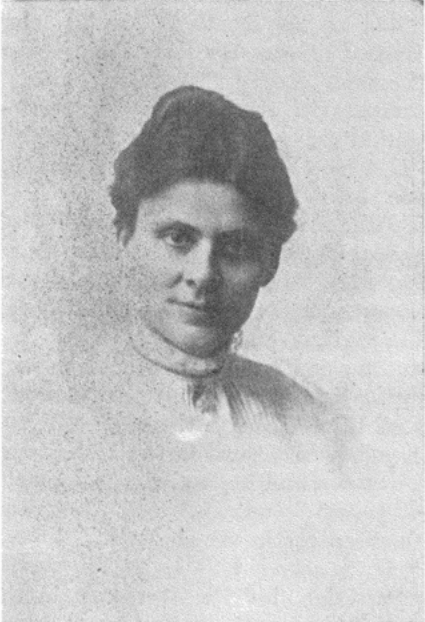
- Miller in 1909
- Born: Mary Farrand Rogers; April 21, 1868; Dallas County, Iowa, U.S.
- Died: October 29, 1971 (aged 103); Los Angeles, California, U.S.
- Occupations: Writer, naturalist, and educator
- Spouse: Wilhelm Tyler Miller (m. 1899; died 1936)
- Children: 2
- Relatives: Julia Ellen Rogers (sister); Nathaniel Peabody Rogers (grandfather)

Mary Farrand Rogers Miller (April 21, 1868 – 1971) was an American writer, naturalist, and educator. She authored The Brook Book (1902) and Outdoor Work (1911), as well as magazine articles and educational pamphlets.

== Biography ==
Mary Farrand Rogers was born April 21, 1868, on a farm in Dallas County, Iowa, to Daniel Farrand and Ruth Dodd Rogers (née Llewellyn). Her father was a pioneer farmer and teacher from Illinois, the son of abolitionist Nathaniel Peabody Rogers, and her mother was a teacher. Mary was the third child in a family of three daughters and five sons. Her older sister, Julia Ellen, would also become a nature writer and teacher.

At the age of 17, Rogers commenced teaching, and spent several years teaching in rural, village and city schools of Iowa and Minnesota. After preparatory study at Iowa State College, she entered Cornell University in 1893. In her senior year she was elected to the Sigma Xi fraternity. That same year she was appointed laboratory assistant in the department of entomology, and did instructor's work in that department during summer terms. In 1896 she graduated with a Bachelor of Science. In 1897, when Cornell began extension classes in the College of Agriculture, she was appointed lecturer in Nature Study. In the summer of 1899 and 1900, she taught in the Cornell Summer School with the rank of instructor.

On June 8, 1899, she married Wilhelm Tyler Miller, a horticulturist who became a noted landscape architect and editor of Country Life in America and The Garden Magazine. They had two children. In 1903, the Millers moved to New York City, and later to New Jersey.

In 1920, she moved with her husband to Los Angeles, where she became lecturer with the University of California Extension.

Later in life after experiencing hearing loss, she became active in deaf education and advocacy. She taught classes in lip reading. She was President of the Los Angeles League for the Hard of Hearing. In 1947 she became head of the Pacific branch of the American Hearing Society. She served as a vice president of the American Hearing Society, president of the Southern California Hearing Council and was a member of the American Association of University Women and United Nations Association.

Her husband died in 1936, and Miller died in Los Angeles, at the age of 103, on October 29, 1971.
