= Ana Grozdanović =

Serbian politician (born 1995)

- Ана Гроздановић

Member of the Main Board of the Socialist Party of Serbia
- In office December 17, 2022 – present

Personal details
- Born: April 21, 1995 (age 31) Niš, Serbia, FR Yugoslavia
- Party: Socialist Party of Serbia
- Spouse: Unnamed ex-husband (c. 2014)
- Children: 1
- Education: University of Niš

Instagram information
- Page: Ana Grozdanovic
- Years active: 2020–present
- Genres: Politics, Vlogging
- Followers: 131 thousand
- Last updated: July 17, 2026

Ana Grozdanović (Note: Serbian Cyrillic: Ана Гроздановић) (born April 21, 1995) is a Serbian politician. She serves on the main board of the Socialist Party of Serbia (SPS) and is a prominent member of the party's youth wing. A notable member of the party from Niš, she has become known for her stalwart defense of the SPS and its longtime allied-party, the Serbian Progressive Party. She has also garnered prominence and media notoriety for her charitable actions and her active social media presence, where her barbika personality has helped her accumulate over 130 thousand followers on Instagram and become regarded as a key asset of the SPS as a result.

== Early life and political beginnings ==
Ana Grozdanović was born on April 21, 1995, in the Serbian city of Niš, then part of Yugoslavia. Her family has long been present in Niš; her great-grandmother's brother died at the local Nazi concentration camp during the German occupation of Yugoslavia. Her grandfather was a member of the Socialist Party of Serbia (SPS). Studying at the University of Niš, she graduated from the Faculty of Law. Before entering politics, she made a living being a cupcake baker and makeup artist, and claimed to have opened three braiding salons in Niš.

At age 18, she joined the SPS. She works in Niš and serves as a member of the Main Board of the SPS, having joined at the party's 11th congress in 2022; she the party's president of the commission for education, culture, youth and sports. She also frequently acts and speaks on behalf of SPS Youth, the party's youth wing, with her being the chair of the Crveni Krst branch. She is an admirer of the SPS politician Snežana Paunović, as well as Ivica Dačić, the SPS leader since 2006, who she has credited with helping her early in her political career and has devotedly defended. She has also expressed support for Slobodan Milošević, the SPS's founder who variously led Serbia and Yugoslavia from 1989 to 2000.

== Career and sociopolitical positions ==
At an SPS Main Board rally at Niš in November 2021, Grozdanović garnered national prominence for a speech in which she stated "only Christians made cathode ray tubes and radio tubes" and that individuals that a bright light would appear that would make them think a nuclear war was underway. Clips of her speech went viral on Serb social media, and she was subject of mockery; though she brushed off the backlash, citing her effort within the party as a defense. She garnered prominence during the 2022 Serbian elections as a stalwart campaigner for the SPS, allied with the ruling Serbian Progressive Party (SNS), effectively headed by President Aleksandar Vučić.

Policy-wise and ideologically, Grozdanović supports rights for ethnic minorities in Serbia, and anti-capitalism. She has expressed conflicting views on Vučić, who has dominated Serbian politics for the past decade. She was, much like the rest of the SPS, initially a supporter of Vučić, having stated that he sought to turn Serbia into Switzerland, and that his detractors were anti-Serb people who did not want to see the country move forward; she implied in November 2022 that those who make critical comments of him should be imprisoned. Following the latter statement, which received extensive backlash, the local SPS branch in Niš distanced itself from her.

As time has progressed, she has become slightly critical of SNS and Vučić, lambasting them in the leadup to the 2023 parliamentary elections for allegedly selling out the party to capitalists via enabling price gouging. In the process, she has publicly clashed with SPS leadership, with her lashing out against the SPS Vice President, Branko Ružić, in April 2026 after he himself began critiquing SNS, alleging that he only did so out of anger of not getting a desired seat after defending the party for so long. She had previously in December 2024 opposed his bid for President of the SPS. Despite this, she reaffirmed in June 2025 that she was pro-SNS and Vučić, dismissing allegations that Serbia under him was undergoing democratic backsliding and a worse international reputation. Amid youth-led, anti-SNS protests that gripped the country following the fatal partial collapse of a train station in Novi Sad in November 2024, she affirmed support for the security forces who had been clashing with protestors in July 2025.

In foreign policy, Grozdanović has expressed pro-Russia views and admiration for Vladimir Putin, and has called for closer relations between Serbia and Russia. She has additionally stated that she emulates Sergey Lavrov, the Russian foreign minister. Domestically, she denies that the Srebrenica massacre, an incident in 1995 during the Bosnian War where Bosnian Serb militias perpetrated a massacre and mass rape of the town's Bosniak population as part of a wide ethnic cleansing campaign, was a genocide. In May 2024, in response to a European Union spokesman describing it as such, Grozdanović accused the EU of using the issue to blackmail Serbia into ascension into the union. She has also criticized the 1999 aerial bombardment campaign by NATO against Yugoslavia at the tail end of the Kosovo War. She believes that NATO's campaign violated international law, and has described it as the start of a currently-ongoing Third World War, one where the "the selfish, raping friends of Jeffrey Epstein", may unleash a nuclear holocaust.

Grozdanović has been accused of making patriarchal statements in regards to gender issues. She has criticized women who divorce; when asked how she could hold such a position when she herself was a divorced single mother, she stated that she was ignorant and wrong at the time. In July 2023, she was criticized for a post online where she stated that she would be committed to the protection of men and would be forming a men's forum, stating that women had "gone too far in taking away the male role in this world", remarks that were criticized as pandering to Serbian male voters, as well as justifying misogynistic attitudes and violence. Later that month, she also criticized females online for posting themselves half-naked online, despite the fact that she herself frequently posts herself on social media scantily-clad. In April 2024, in response to Serbia's declining birthrate, she advocated for the normalization of polygyny, issuing appeals to Serbian women not to be jealous, arguing that the birthrate issue threatened Serbia to the extent that such a social shift was necessary provided the women in these relationships rear children.

== Personal life, social media, and charity controversies ==
Grozdanović is known for being prolific on social media, specifically Instagram. Described as "Serbia's most beautiful politician", she is known for her barbika glamorous lifestyle and appearance she showcases on the app. She currently has 131 thousand followers as of July 2026. Her sometimes controversial activity online has opened her up the online harassment according to her. She lives in a luxurious home in Niš. She is a single mother, having mothered a child with an ex-husband while in university at age 20. In 2023, Serbian media reported that she was in a relationship with then Red Star Belgrade goalkeeper Nikola Vasiljević.

Grozdanović has engaged in various charitable causes, which she has amplified on social media. In the aftermath of the 2022 Serbian general election, she garnered virality when she claimed to have secured a free job and annual payment of 50 thousand dinars as a reward for every single mother who aided her during the campaign, and in later that year also sent veterans of the Serbian military to vacation in Vrnjačka Banja. She has later made headlines for giving children in Niš Kinder Eggs and for financially aiding four young couples for their weddings.

Some of these acts have come under scrutiny for being promotional for the SPS. In February 2023, Grozdanović took to social media to show herself giving out free notebooks, pens, pedants, and 5,000 dinars to a hundred people, alongside SPS's youth wing. The donors for said products, which she only referred to anonymously as her "dear friends", were never disclosed; subsequentially, the Agency for the Prevention of Corruption (APC) stated that they had launched an investigation to determine whether Grozdanović's actions violated the Law on Financing Political Activities. In response, she dismissed the allegations, stating that she had merely gifted her fellow citizens in an act of kindness and that a wealthy financier who regularly donates to the church and charitable causes that she called "X-person" was behind the stunt. The leader of the Niš SPS, Igor Novaković, denied knowledge of her actions, affirming that all official local SPS acts will go through him or the party's city committee. During campaigning for parliamentary elections later that year, she was fined by the APC for giving out chocolate and coffee funded by another unknown donor to citizens to promote the SPS. In 2025, she was again reported to the APC for an Instagram post where she announced in front of an SPS banner and with a portrait of Ivica Dačić that she had given 100 thousand dinars to a hundred single mothers and fifty single fathers. The affairs were interpreted as being part of a broader normalization of open money-giving by Serbian political campaigns.
