= Life Guard Horse Regiment =

Imperial Russian cavalry regiment

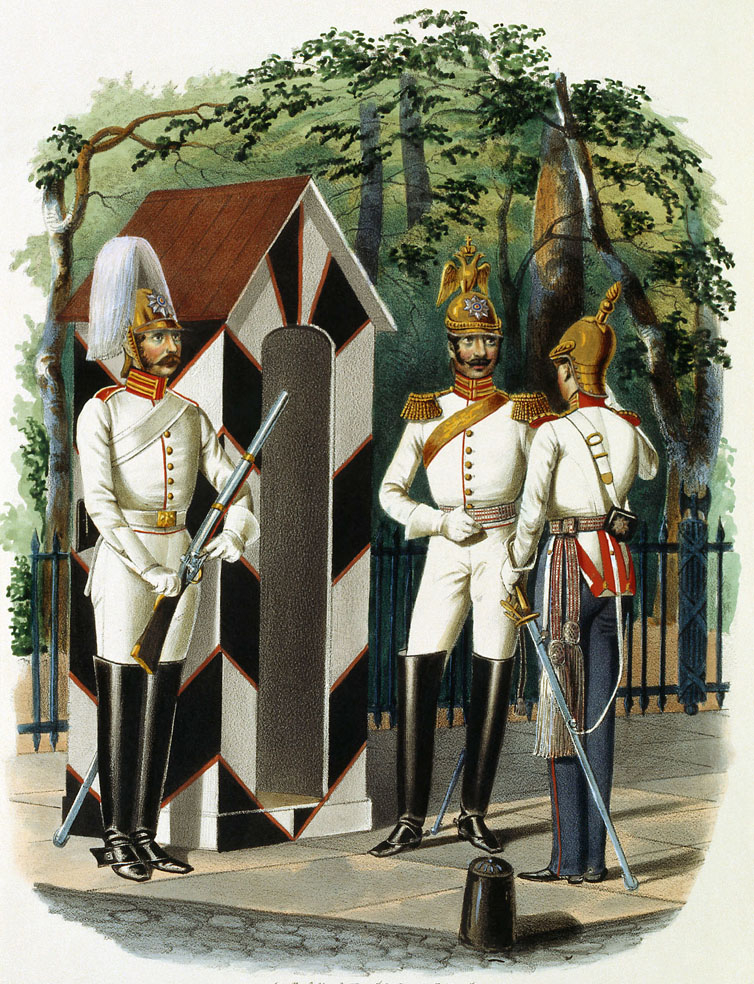
The uniforms of the Imperial Guards' Horse Regiment in 1848

The Life Guard Horse Regiment (Russian: Конный лейб-гвардии полк, romanized: konnyy leyb-gvardii polk) was a cavalry regiment of the Imperial Guard of Russian Empire. The regiment was founded in the reign of Peter the Great and was disbanded after the October Revolution in 1917. Its annual feast day was 25 March.

== History ==
=== Formation ===
The regiment was formed on 7 March 1721 from the Life Dragoon Squadron of Prince Alexander Danilovich Menshikov, the Dragoon Company of Count Sheremetev, and the Kronshlot Dragoon Company.

On 21 December 1725, the regiment was reorganized along the lines of Swedish regiments and staffed exclusively by nobles. Unlike other dragoons, the regimental colour was red and their waistcoats had golden cords; they carried two pistols instead of one, and no axes. The regiment was granted the timpani drums captured from the Swedish Horse Guards at the Battle of Poltava on 8 July 1709.

On 31 December 1730 (N.S. 11 January 1731), the regiment was renamed the Horse Guards and given all the rights of the guards, marking the beginning of the regular guards cavalry. The regiment consisted of 5 squadrons of 2 companies each, a total of 1,423 people of which 1,111 were front-line officers. Empress Anna Ioannovna accepted the honorary rank of colonel or chief of the regiment; this title was subsequently held by Peter III of Russia, Catherine the Great and others.

The casual uniform of the horse guards was similar to the dragoons, differing only in the jacket's red color and the trousers. The parade uniform consisted of a tunic, undertail and pants made from buckskin leather, an iron half-sleeve with copper elements, a broadsword on the waist belt, a carbine without a bayonet with a sash and two pistols. Equipment and horse headgear were similar to that of the dragoons. Since the time of Empress Anna Ioannovna, the regiment was staffed mainly by the Ostsee (Baltic) Germans.

=== Russo-Turkish War (1735–1739) ===
In 1737 the regiment took part in fighting for the first time. During the Russo-Turkish war three of its ten companies fought to capture Ochakov and in the Battle of Stavuchany.

=== Napoleonic Wars ===
Emperor Paul I of Russia made the regiment a part of his Gatchina troops and in 1800 appointed Grand Duke Konstantin Pavlovich of Russia as the chief of the regiment.

In 1801, Emperor Alexander I changed its name to the Life Guards Equestrian Regiment. After the death of Grand Duke Konstantin Pavlovich in 1831, each successive regimental chief was a regent or heir to the throne.

==== War of the Third Coalition ====
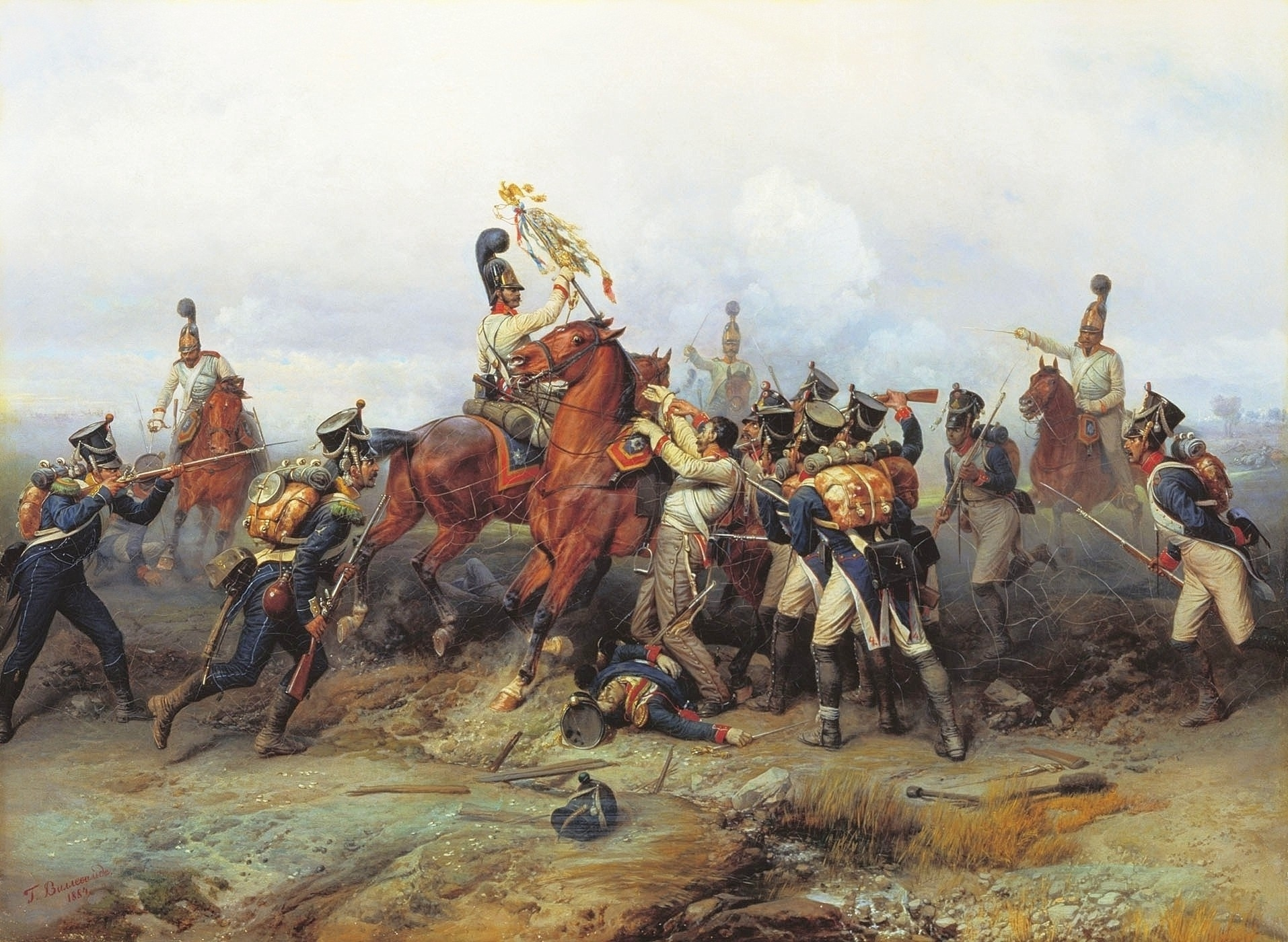
Regimental troops capturing the 4th Line Infantry Regiment's eagle at the Battle of Austerlitz

In 1805, the regiment took part in the Austrian campaign against the Great Army of Emperor Napoleon, and on 20 November it participated in the Battle of Austerlitz. All five squadrons of the regiment under the command of Major General Ivan Yankovich, along with the Imperial Guards' Hussars, attacked a battalion of French infantry. Privates of the 3rd Platoon of the regiment's 2nd Squadron Gavrilov, Omelchenko, Ushakov and Lazunov captured an honorary trophy—the French battalion "eagle" of the 4th line regiment. For this distinction, the inscription "For the capture of the enemy banner at Austerlitz on 20 November 1805" was added to the regiment standard.

==== War of the Fourth Coalition ====
In 1807, the Horse Guards fought in the battles of Heilsberg and Friedland. On 2 June (N.S. 14 June) at Friedland, the regiment attacked and overturned the French cavalry and then broke into the infantry regiments. The 4th squadron of the regiment under the command of rittmeister Ivan M. Vadbolsky, at the cost of heavy losses, saved the regiment from counterattacks by French cavalry. In the cavalry attack, 16 officers and 116 enlisted men of the regiment were killed.

==== Patriotic War of 1812 ====
The regiment distinguished itself in the battle of Borodino in 1812. Together with the Chevalier Guard Regiment it attacked Lorge's cuirassier division from the La Tour-Maubourg corps at the Raevsky battery. For this fight, 32 officers of the horse guards received commendations.

==== War of the Sixth Coalition ====
In April 1813, the regiment was awarded the St. George banner with the inscription "For distinction in the defeat and expulsion of the enemy from the borders of Russia in 1812."

In 1813, the regiment participated in the Foreign Campaign of the Russian Army:

- on August 16–18 (N.S. 28-30) at Kulm,
- on October 4–7 (N.S. 16-19) at Leipzig.

For the last battle at Fère-Champenoise the regiment received 22 St. George crosses with the inscription "For courage against the enemy at Fère-Champenoise on 13 March 1814." On 19 March (N.S. 31 March) 1814, the regiment entered Paris. For this campaign the regiment was awarded another St. George banner.

=== Decembrist revolt (1825) ===
On December 14, 1825, the regiment participated in the suppression of rebellion on Senate Square in Saint Petersburg. This day, private of 3rd squadron Pavel Panyuta was shot dead.

=== November Uprising (1830–1831) ===
On 25–27 August (N.S. 6–8 September) 1831, two battalions participated in the suppression of Polish rebellion and taking of Warsaw.

=== Caucasian War ===
From 1835 to 1846, many officers of the regiment volunteered in the Caucasian War.

=== Hungarian Revolution of 1848 ===
In 1849, the regiment participated in the suppression of the revolt in Hungary.

=== Crimean War (1853–1856) ===
During the Crimean War, the regiment was assigned to guard the coast of the Gulf of Finland from Peterhof to St. Petersburg in case of an Anglo-French landing.

=== Russo-Turkish war (1877–1878) ===
In 1877–1878, many officers of the regiment were volunteers in the Russo-Turkish war.

=== Russo-Japanese War (1904–1905) ===
In the Russo-Japanese War, the regiment did not participate in the battles, but several officers and 28 lower ranks of the regiment volunteered to the front.

=== World War I ===
In 1914, the regiment marched to the German front as part of the 1st Army under General Rennenkampf. On August 6, it participated in the battle of Kaushen where the guards attacked the German battery on foot, covered with machine guns. The regiment suffered heavy losses. The outcome of the attack was decided by the cavalry attack of the Life Squadron under the command of the captain P. N. Wrangel, during which almost all the squadron officers were killed.

On 28 July 1917, the regiment was renamed the Horse Guards. In December, the regiment began disbanding. On 19 December, the first division (1st, 2nd and 5th squadrons) was disbanded near Zhmerinka, followed by the second division (3rd, 4th and 6th squadrons). The officers and part of the lower ranks went home, and about 150 lower ranks returned to the barracks in Petrograd (now St. Petersburg), where in February–March 1918 the regiment was finally disbanded.

=== Post-Revolution: Russian Civil War ===
==== Red Army ====
The Petrograd Soviet formed the 1st Mounted Regiment of the Red Army from the lower ranks and non-commissioned officers of the guards who returned to Petrograd in January 1918. The regiment's staff was as follows:

- the regiment commander – E. I. Kusin;
- assistant commander Fomichev;
- commander of the 1st squadron Eroshov, an adjutant of the Karachintsev regiment, which was disarmed in the spring of 1919 as the regiment's officers desired to join the white movement.

==== White Army ====
===== 1919 Spring =====
From January 1919, horse guardsmen, along with other guards cuirassiers, formed a team of equestrian reconnaissance officers of the Combined Guards Infantry Regiment of the Volunteer Army. In March 1919, the Consolidated Regiment of the Guards Cuirassier Division was formed, in which horse guards made up the 2nd Squadron.

===== 1919 Summer =====
In June 1919, the 1st Guards Combined Cuirassier Regiment was formed on the basis of the Consolidated Regiment, in which horse guards were represented by 2 squadrons.

===== 1919 Winter =====
On December 15, 1919, the squadron of the Horse Regiment entered the Combined Guards Cavalry Regiment of the 1st Cavalry Division.

===== 1920 =====
On arrival in the Crimea from 1 May 1920, the unit became the 2nd squadron of the Guards Cavalry Regiment of the Russian Army under General Wrangel.

During the battles of the summer-autumn of 1920, the squadron suffered many casualties and in September 1920 was disbanded. The survivors were reduced to a platoon, which General Wrangel turned into his personal guard. The regiment lost 18 officers in the White movement (5 were shot, 12 were killed and 1 died of disease), and according to other data 23.

=== Aftermath ===
Many survivors went into exile where in 1923 they formed a regimental association ("Union of Horse Guards" from 1923 to 1939, later "Horse Guards Association"). Its membership diminished from 105 in 1931 to 50 in 1951. From 1953 to 1967 it published an annual journal on a rotating basis.

== Honorary Colonels of the Horse Guards and regimental chiefs ==
Chiefs (honorary commanders):

- 1730–1740 – Empress Anna Ioannovna
- 1740–1741 – Emperor Ivan VI
- 1741–1761 – Empress Elizaveta Petrovna
- 1761–1762 – Emperor Peter III
- February–June 1762 – Field Marshal Prince George Ludwig Schleswig-Holstein
- 1762–1779 – Empress Catherine II
- 1796–1801 – Emperor Paul I
- 1796–1800 – Grand Duke Nikolai Pavlovich
- September–October 1800 – Alexander Friedrich Karl Prince of Württemberg
- 1800–1831 – Grand Duke Konstantin Pavlovich
- 1831–1855 – Emperor Nicholas I
- 1855–1881 – Emperor Alexander II
- 1881–1894 – Emperor Alexander III
- 1894–1917 – Emperor Nicholas II

== Lieutenant colonels of the Horse Guards ==
- 1730–1731 – General-in-Chief Count Yaguzhinsky
- 1731–1736 – Adjutant General, Lieutenant-General Prince Alexey Ivanovich Shakhovskoy
- 1736–1738 – Major General Burchard Ernst von Trautvetter
- 1738–1740 – Prince of Courland Count von Biron
- 1740–1763 – General Yuri Liven
- 1748–1762 – Field Marshal Count Razumovsky
- 1762–1780 – General-in-Chief Prince Volkonsky
- 1764–1783 – General-in-Chief Prince Orlov
- 1784–1796 – Field Marshal Count Rumyantsev-Zadunaisky
- 1790–1796 – Adjutant-General Count Saltykov

== Regiment commanders ==
- 1731–1738 – General Burchard Ernst von Trautvetter
- 1740–1744 – General Yuri Liven
- 1744–1761 – General Prince Pyotr Borisovich Cherkassky
- 1761–1762 – General Yakov Berger
- 1762–1764 – General Prince Pyotr Petrovich Cherkassky
- 1764–1767 – General Prince Golitsyn
- 1767–1781 – General Ivan Ivanovich Davydov
- 1781–1788 – General Ivan Ivanovich Mikhelson
- 1788–1789 – Major Pyotr Ivanovich Bobarykin
- 1789–1789 – General Alexander Mikhailovich Rimsky-Korsakov
- 1789–1792 – Major Pyotr Ivanovich Bobarykin
- 1792–1793 – General Vasily Sergeyevich Sheremetev
- 1793–1797 – General Grigory Alekseyevich Vasilchikov
- 1797–1797 – General Pyotr Semyonovich Muravyov
- 1797–1798 – General Baron von der Palen
- 1798–1798 – General Pyotr Semyonovich Muravyov
- 1798–1800 – General Prince Golitsyn
- 1800–1800 – General Mikhail Sergeyevich Karakulin
- 1800–1800 – Colonel Ivan Janković de Mirievo
- 1800–1800 – General Sergey Alekseyevich Kozhin
- 1800–1803 – General Alexander Petrovich Tormasov
- 1803–1811 – General Ivan Janković de Mirievo
- 1811–1819 – General Mikhail Andreyevich Arsenyev
- 1819–1828 – General Count Orlov
- 1828–1833 – General Baron Offenberg
- 1833–1837 – General Baron Meyendorff
- 1837–1844 – General Anton Antonovich Essen
- 1844–1853 – General Pyotr Petrovich Lanskoy
- 1853–1855 – General Count Lambert
- 1855–1864 – General Prince Golitsyn
- 1864–1869 – General Count von Grabbe
- 1869–1871 – General Alexander Nikolaevich Manvelov
- 1871–1875 – General Count Protasov-Bakhmetev
- 1875–1883 – General Baron Frederiks
- 1883–1884 – Colonel Prince Baryatinsky
- 1884–1890 – General Konstantin Aleksandrovich Blok
- 1890–1896 – Grand Duke Pavel Alexandrovich
- 1896–1901 – General Prince Odoyevsky-Maslov
- 1901–1904 – General Yevgeny Aleksandrovich Gerngross
- 1904–1906 – General Prince Bagration-Mukhransky
- 1906–1911 – General Huseyn Khan Nakhichevan
- 1911–1914 – General Pavel Petrovich Skoropadsky
- 1914–1917 – General Boris Egorovich Gartman
- 1917–1917 – Colonel Vsevolod Dmitrievich Staroselsky
- 1917–1917 – General Mikhail Evgrafovich Alenich

== Appearance ==
The lower ranks of the regiment were recruited from tall men with brown hair and mustaches. In the 4th squadron they would also have beards.

The general regimental colour of horses was black (from the early days of the regiment, then shifting during the period of wars, going back to black in 1823). From 1737, for regimental trumpeters the color of horses was gray.

== Distinctions awarded after battle ==
St. George's standard with St. Andrew's jubilee ribbon and inscriptions: "For the capture of the enemy banner at Austerlitz and for the distinction of the defeat and expulsion of the enemy from the limits of Russia in 1812" and "1730–1830".

22 St. George's pipe, with the words "Fère-Champenoise."

Silver timpani with the inscription: "Sub. Felicissimo, cersemine Potentissime Regissvecia Carolus XII cum. Polonis Saxon. Tart. Woloscis et noc formen icta globum, hostitis Clitzoviam in Pol. 1702" ("For the glorious victory of the Great King of Sweden Charles XII over the Poles, Saxons, Tatars, Wallachs and other foreign peoples under Kliszów in Poland. 1702"). Belonged to the Swedish Mounted Guard, repulsed at Perevolochna and granted to the Life-squadron of Prince Menshikov; after the formation of the Life Guards of the Horse Regiment, they were handed over to the arsenal, then they were kept in the Court Church in Strelna and on July 4, 1827, they were again issued to the regiment.

== Regimental buildings ==
At the end of the reign of Catherine II, the building of the Horse Guards Regiment was transferred to the barracks of the Tauride Palace—the residence of Prince Potemkin-Tauricheski, presented to him by the empress, and after his death in 1791, returned to the treasury (all palace property by order of Paul I was transferred to the new imperial residence, Mikhailovsky Castle). After the murder of Paul, the emperor Alexander I again included the building in the number of imperial residences. In exchange for the construction of barracks, stables and arena, a section was laid between Konnogvardeisky Boulevard and Admiralteyskaya Street (later—Bolshaya or Novo-Isaakievskaya, since 1923—Yakubovich Street), bounded by Senate Square on one side and Malaya Lugovaya Street (after 1836) Blagoveshchenskaya, from 1923—Labor Street )—on the other.

=== Manege ===
Horse Guards Manege Horse Guards Manege was erected in the years 1804-1807 by the architect Giacomo Quarenghi. The building in classical style, stretched between Konnogvardeisky Boulevard (No. 2) and Admiralteyskaya Street (the modern address is Yakubovich Street, 1) faces to Senate Square and Alexander Garden with its facade.

Between 1931 and 1934, the prisoner "sharashka", architect N. Ye. Lancere, carried out the reconstruction of the arena under the OGPU garage: a second floor with leading ramps was built on it.

Since 1967, the building of the former Horse Guards Manege has been used as an exhibition hall (Manege Central Exhibition Hall).

=== Horse Guards Barracks ===
At the same time [to specify] with the arena the buildings of regimental stables and barracks were built:

No. 4 on Konnogvardeisky Boulevard (No. 3 on Yakubovich Street, No. 1 on Pochtamtsky Street, No. 2 on Konnogvardeysky Lane). Since 2008, this building houses the Museum of Russian Vodka. No. 6 on Konnogvardeisky Boulevard (No. 5 on Yakubovich Street, No. 1 on Konnogvardeysky Lane, No. 6 Truda Street (at that time—Malaya Lugovaya, after 1836, with the construction of the regimental church—Blagoveshchenskaya).

=== Church ===
In 1844–1849, near the barracks, on the Sea Meadow, a regimental temple was erected—the Church of the Annunciation. The building in the "Russian style", designed by the architect Konstantin Thon, was demolished shortly after the church closed in 1929 under the pretext of "constraining the tram traffic". The foundations, the cave church and the necropolis were destroyed in the mid-1990s during the construction of an underground shopping complex (at present, an underground passage under Labor Square).

== See also ==
- Saint Petersburg Manege

== Notes ==
↑ The rank of Colonel Guard, from 1730 to 1796, corresponded to the title of chief ↑ The rank of lieutenant colonel of the guard, from 1730 to 1796, corresponded to the rank of second chief ↑ Ill. 699. Chief Officer and Trumpeter of Her Majesty's Cavalry Guard and L. Guv. Equestrian regiments. 1845 // Historical description of clothes and weapons of Russian troops, with drawings, compiled by the highest order : 30 tons, 60 books. / Ed. A.V. Viskovatova . - Paris: Imp. Lemercier, 1861-1862. ↑ Life Guard Horse Regiment

== Literature ==
Annenkov I.V. The History of the Life Guards of the Horse Regiment (1731–1848): at 4 am - 1849, the Imperial Academy of Sciences. Annenkov, I.V. (1849) История Лейб-гвардии Конного полка 1731–1848. Volumes I–IV. Imperial Academy of Sciences.
