= Herbert Wetterauer =

German painter and author

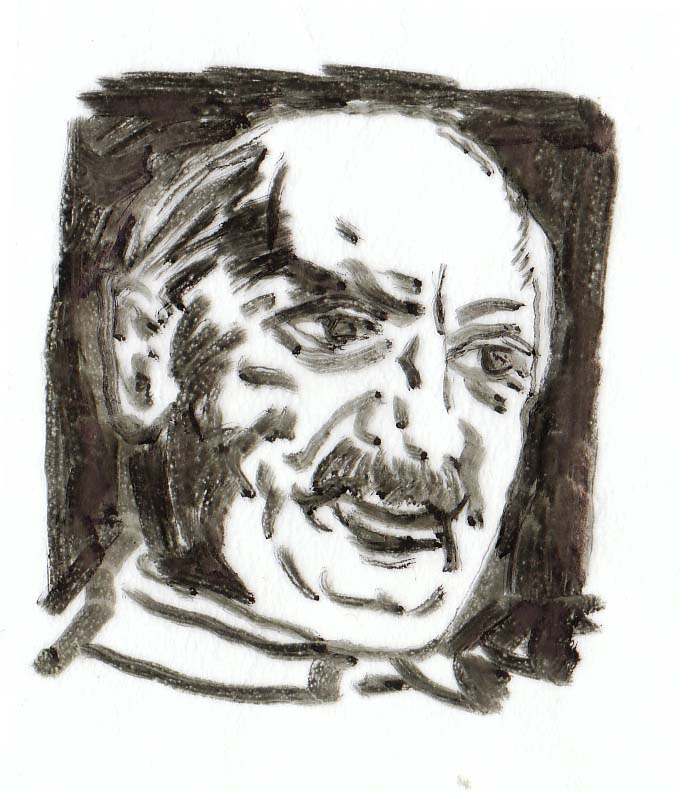
Brush drawing by Herbert Wetterauer (Portrait of Martin Heidegger, 2010)

Herbert Wetterauer (born on Easter Sunday 21 April 1957 in Karlsruhe, West Germany) is a German painter, sculptor and author. He is known for his paintings in ink and life-sized figures made of paperboard, for which he developed his own technique.

Wetterauer studied German Language at the University of Karlsruhe and Fine Arts at the State Academy of Fine Arts Karlsruhe. For many years he was busy as a journalist, writing primary art criticism.

In 2009 his first novel named Stromness appeared, followed by the novels Du sollst nicht vertrauen and tod.com. His latest books, The Herd, Smilodon, Tyranny, The Trail of the Ancestors, Great Politics, Teile (Parts) and Die Schwarte (The Rind) are also available in English.

== Exhibitions (selection) ==
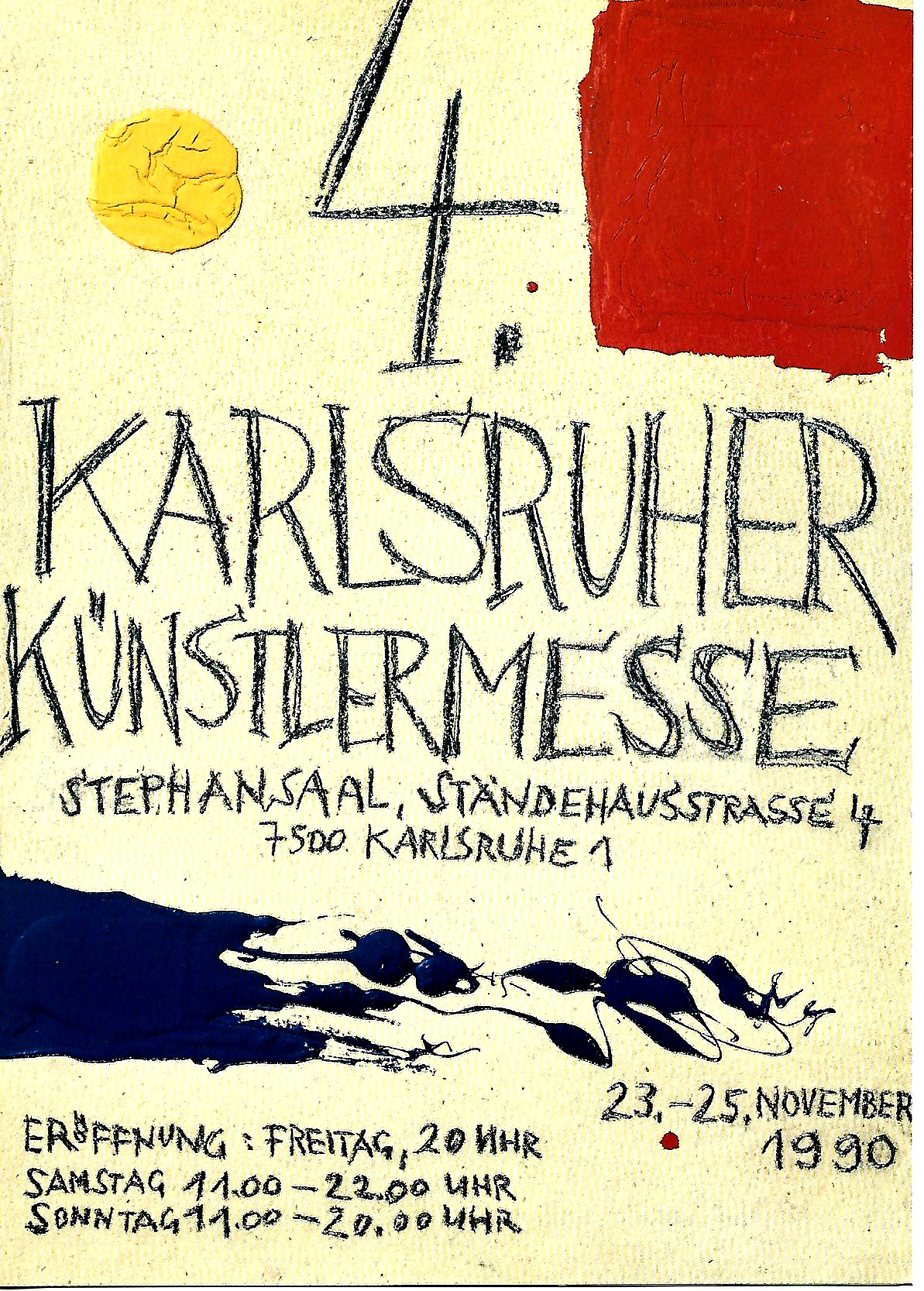
Poster-Advertising for the 4th Karlsruher Künstlermesse by Herbert Wetterauer

- 2011: Presentation by the United Artists of Karlsruhe
- 2008: One-Man-Show at the official art-shop-window (Kunstschaufenster ) of the City of Karlsruhe
- 2001: Künstlerhaus-Gallery Karlsruhe
- 1995: Art-Collection Westermann, City-Gallery of Rastatt
- 1993: First Biennale for Material- and Textile-Art, Bayreuth and Manchester
- 1990: First prize in the poster-competition, 4th Karlsruher Art-Mass
- 1983: One-Man-Show at the State Art Museum Baden-Baden
- 1983: One-Man-Show at Gallery Forum Rotart Karlsruhe

== Own publications ==
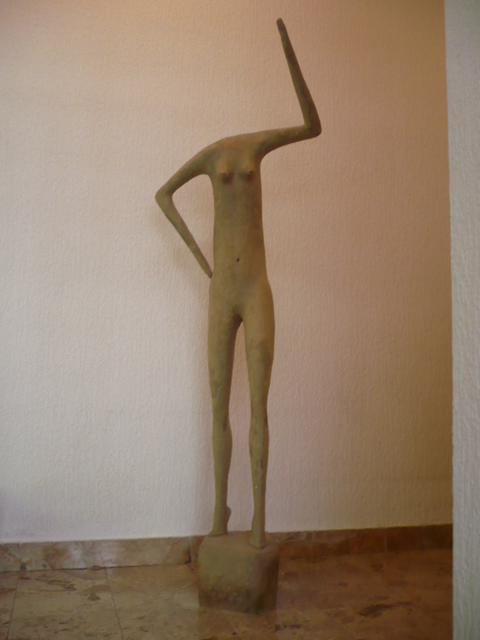
Sculpture made of massive paperboard by Herbert Wetterauer

- Consumption-Christmas, pferscha Nr. 3, Graz 1974
- The Mechanic of Cartoon-Drawings, Journal of Art Nr. 5, 1975
- Katchina, Ketchup-Magazine Nr. 2, 1981
- KiK-Magazine Nr. 9 – 70, 1980–1983
- The March of the Art-History, Artist Nr. 38, 1999
- Stromness, Schardt Verlag, Oldenburg, 2009, ISBN 978-3-89841-487-6
- The White Dog (Short story) in Neues Karlsruher Lesebuch, Info Verlag, Karlsruhe, 2010, ISBN 978-3-88190-589-3
- Du sollst nicht vertrauen, E-Book, 2013; KDP-Paperback, 2019, ISBN 978-1-7979-4316-9
- DANEBEN – Geschichten aus der Nachbarschaft. E-Book 2013; KDP-Paperback 2019, ISBN 978-1-7980-0066-3
- tod.com, Info Verlag, Karlsruhe 2013, ISBN 978-3-88190-747-7
- Haltung der griechischen Landschildkröte. E-Book und KDP-Paperback, 2019, ISBN 978-1-7984-7036-7
- Das Werk – Eine Monographie in Selbstzeugnissen. E-Book und KDP-Paperback, 2020, ISBN 979-8-5796-4146-5
- Wurst – ein Leitfaden. Erzählungen. E-Book und KDP-Paperback, 2020, ISBN 979-8-6900-3785-7
- Kein Tag ohne Linie – Ein Memes-Bilderbuch. KDP-Paperback, 2021, ISBN 979-8-7033-6731-5
- Erzählungen eines Grenzgängers. Erzählungen. KDP-Taschenbuch, E-Book und Hardcover. 2022, ISBN 979-8-81452323-5
- Die Herde. Roman. KDP-Taschenbuch, E-Book und Hardcover. 2023, ISBN 979-8-36970046-4
- Tyrannis. Roman. KDP-Taschenbuch, E-Book und Hardcover. 2025, ISBN 979-8-26754844-1

== Reporting ==
- Badisches Tagblatt, 22 September 1983
- Kunstforum international, Bd. 69, 1984
- Badische Neueste Nachrichten, 30 March 1989; 26 June 2010
- Der Kurier, 5 April 1991, 29 April 2010; 25 June 2010
- Nürnberger Nachrichten, 21 May 1993
- Het Nieuwsblad (NL), 9 October 1994
- Eindhovens Dagblad (NL), 16 October 1994
- Pfalz-Echo, 21 December 2009, 25 November 2013
- RaumK, Nr. 89, March 2010
- Die Rheinpfalz, 6. Januar 2010, 19. Januar 2021
- Klappe auf, Issue May 2010
