= Kulm Cross =

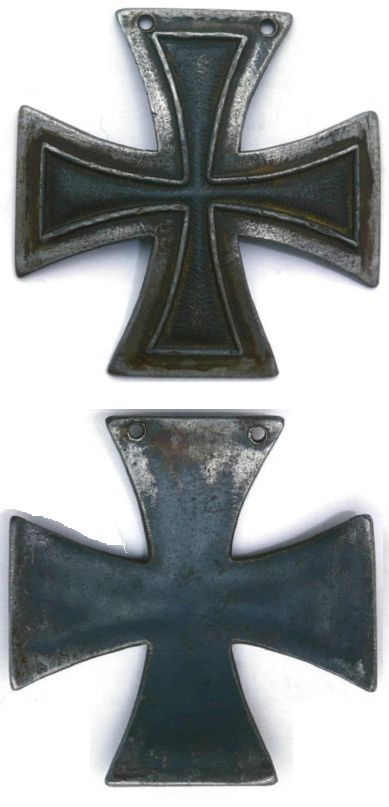
The Kulm Cross

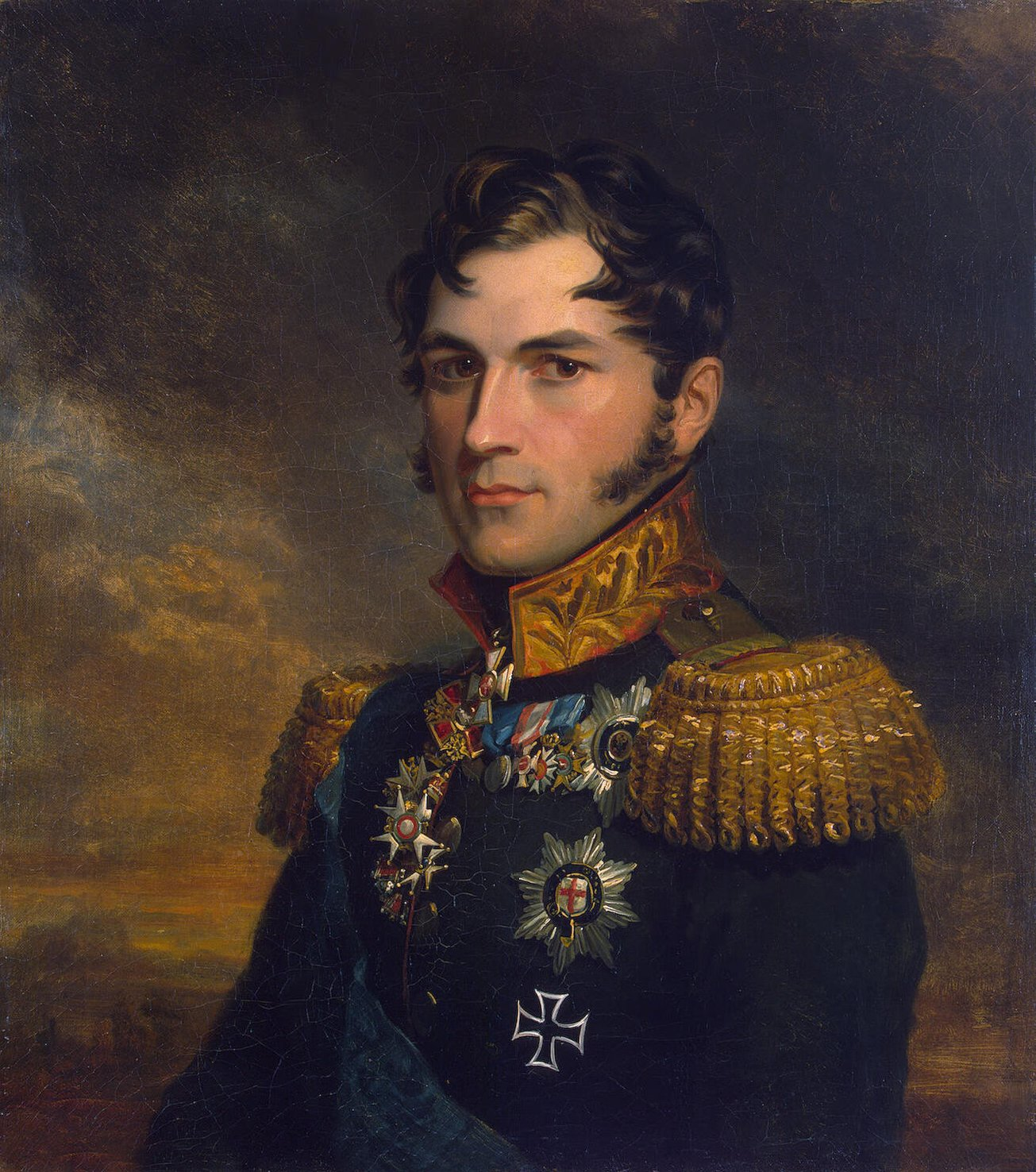
Leopold I of Belgium with the Kulm Cross

The Kulm Cross (German: Kulmer Kreuz; Russian: Кульмcкиӣ кpecт) was a Prussian award. It was a version of the badge of the Iron Cross. It was created on 4 December 1813 by Frederick William III of Prussia after the battle of Kulm. It was not awarded for any special act of courage or merit. Officers wore it in silver and NCOs and other ranks in metal. It was worn on the tunic, with no ribbon.

A Russian version of the order was completely identical in size and shape to the Prussian Order of the Iron Cross, differing only in that it had no date and monogram of the king. By awarding this cross 12,066 people were represented, but the reward could only be obtained by 7,131 soldiers who survived to 1816.

== Recipients ==
- Władysław Grzegorz Branicki
- Leopold I of Belgium
- Aleksandr Mirkovich
- Ivan Nabokov
- Alexey Fyodorovich Orlov

== Bibliography ==
- Jörg Nimmergut: Das eiserne Kreuz 1813–1939. Deutsches Ordensmuseum, Lüdenscheid 1990. (Gegenwart und Geschichte des Auszeichnungswesens, Teil 3.)
