= Paul D. Cronin =

American horse rider (1936–2024)

- Born: May 26, 1936; Dover, Massachusetts, U.S.
- Died: December 29, 2024 (aged 88); Middleburg, Virginia, U.S.
- Occupations: Horseman, riding instructor, and author
- Employer: Sweet Briar College (1967–2002)

Paul David Cronin (May 26, 1936 – December 29, 2024) was an American horseman, riding instructor, and author. He studied under Vladimir Littauer for 30 years, and taught Littauer's forward seat riding system. His book Schooling and Riding the Sport Horse (2004) was intended to be a modern and updated version of Littauer's Commonsense Horsemanship. In it, Cronin detailed the history of the American forward seat riding system, gave advice on training young and green horses, and outlined a three-part system based on controls, position and schooling.

Cronin was director of the riding program at Sweet Briar College from 1967–2002, and became Professor Emeritus and Director of Riding Emeritus in 2003. Among his students there was Olympic athlete Lendon Gray, rider of Seldom Seen.

Cronin was involved with the American National Riding Commission, and was an "R" judge for hunt seat competitions from 1965 to 1987. In the state of Virginia, he was a member of the equitation committee of the Virginia Horse Show Association from 1974 to 1980, was a director for the Virginia Horse Council in 1981–1982, and was on the riding committee of the Old Dominion Athletic Conference from 1985 until 2001. Beginning in 1999 Cronin was an advisory member at large for the Affiliated/American National Riding Council. Cronin died on December 29, 2024, at the age of 88.

== Publications ==
- Riding Standards. The Policies and Operating Procedures of the National Riding Committee 1973-1974. Washington, DC: American Association for Health, Physical Education, and Recreation, 1973 (editor)
- Schooling and Riding the Sport Horse: A Modern American Hunter Jumper System. Charlottesville: University of Virginia Press, 2004 (foreword by Joe Fargis)

== Awards ==
- 1987 - Coach of the Year, Old Dominion Athletic Conference
- 1997 - Educator of the Year Award, Virginia Horse Council
- 1997 - Hall of Fame Inductee, Southwest Virginia Hunter Jumper Association
- 2006 - One of 12 Affiliate Regional Awards of the United States Hunter/Jumper Association
- 2009 - Pegasus Award, United States Equestrian Federation
