= Lendon Gray =

American dressage champion and author

- Born: Lendon Fentress Gray; April 12, 1949; Old Town, Maine
- Occupations: dressage rider, riding instructor, author

Lendon Fentress Gray (born April 13, 1949), is an American dressage champion, author, and former rider of Seldom Seen.

Gray was born in Old Town, Maine, and began riding horses and competing at a young age, originally in the Western and hunt seat schools of equitation. She competed to national level at Pony Club rallies. She attended The Foxhollow School for Girls and then Sweet Briar College, where she trained in the forward seat riding system under Paul D. Cronin.

== Olympics ==
In 1975, Gray began riding Seldom Seen, a 14.2 h (147 cm) Thoroughbred/Connemara cross. The pair competed in FEI dressage tests to Grand Prix level between 1977 and 1987. On Seldom Seen and four other horses, Gray won five gold medals at U.S. Olympic Festivals. Gray qualified for the 1980 U.S. Olympic team but did not compete due to the U.S. Olympic Committee's boycott of the 1980 Summer Olympics in Moscow, Russia. She was one of 461 athletes to receive a Congressional Gold Medal instead.

== Dressage ==
Gray represented the United States at the Dressage World Championships in 1978, and at the 1991 Dressage World Cup in Paris. In 1980, Gray rode Beppo, a Holsteiner gelding, for the American team at the Alternate Olympics dressage event at Goodwood House, in West Sussex, England. In 1988, she competed in dressage on Later On with the United States Equestrian Team in the 1988 Olympics in Seoul.

Gray is a United States Dressage Federation instructor and clinician, as well as one of the founders of the non-profit Emerging Dressage Athlete Program for young riders. She was inducted to the USDF Hall of Fame in 2011.

== Publications ==
- Gray, Lendon Lessons with Lendon: 25 Progressive Dressage Lessons Take You from Basic "Whoa and Go" to Your First Competition (Popular Training Series from Practical Horseman). Knight Equestrian Books, 2003.
