= Littauer =

Littauer and Litauer are German language surnames, meaning "a person from Littau" "a person from Litovel". Notable people with the surname include:

- Florence Littauer (1928–2020), Christian writer and motivational speaker
- Lucius Littauer (1859–1944), politician, businessman, and college football coach
- Mary Aiken Littauer (1912–2005), equestrian
- Raphael M. Littauer (1925–2009), American physicist
- Stefan Litauer (1892–1959), Polish journalist and state functionary
- Vladimir Littauer (1892–1989), horseback riding master
