= Military Gallery of the Winter Palace =

Portrait gallery in the Winter Palace of Saint Petersburg, Russia

Coordinates: 59°56′27″N 30°18′52″E

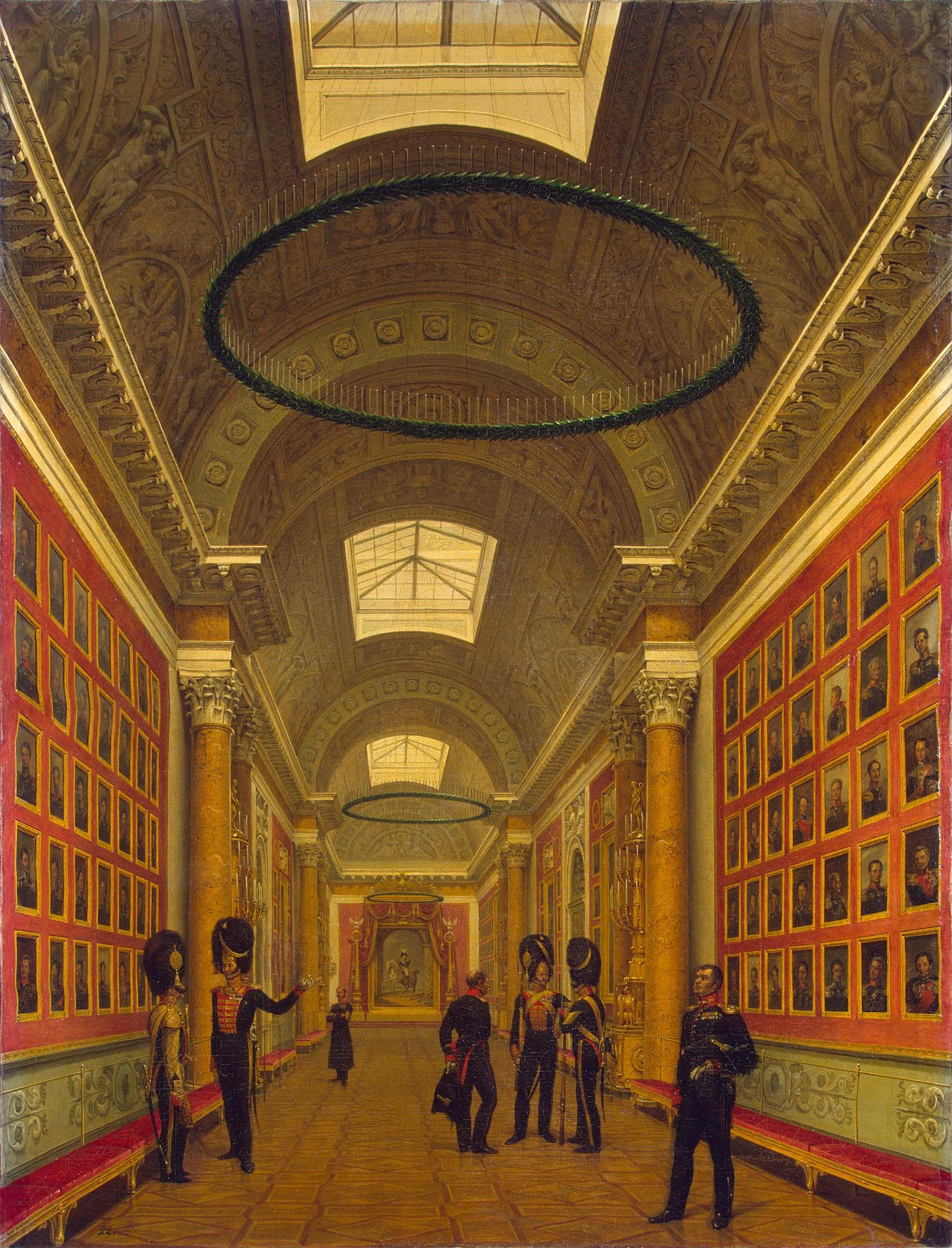
The Military Gallery of the Winter Palace, painted by Grigory Chernetsov, 1827

The Military Gallery (Russian: Военная галерея) is a gallery of the Winter Palace in Saint Petersburg, Russia. The gallery is a setting for 332 portraits of generals who took part in the Patriotic War of 1812. The portraits were painted by George Dawe and his Russian assistants Alexander Polyakov (1801–1835), a serf, and Wilhelm August Golicke.

== Construction ==
The top-lit, barrel-vaulted hall in which the gallery is accommodated was designed by architect Carlo Rossi and constructed from June to November 1826. It replaced several small rooms in the middle of the main block of the Winter Palace - between the White Throne Hall and the Greater Throne Hall, just a few steps from the palace church. The gallery was opened in a solemn ceremony on 25 December 1826.

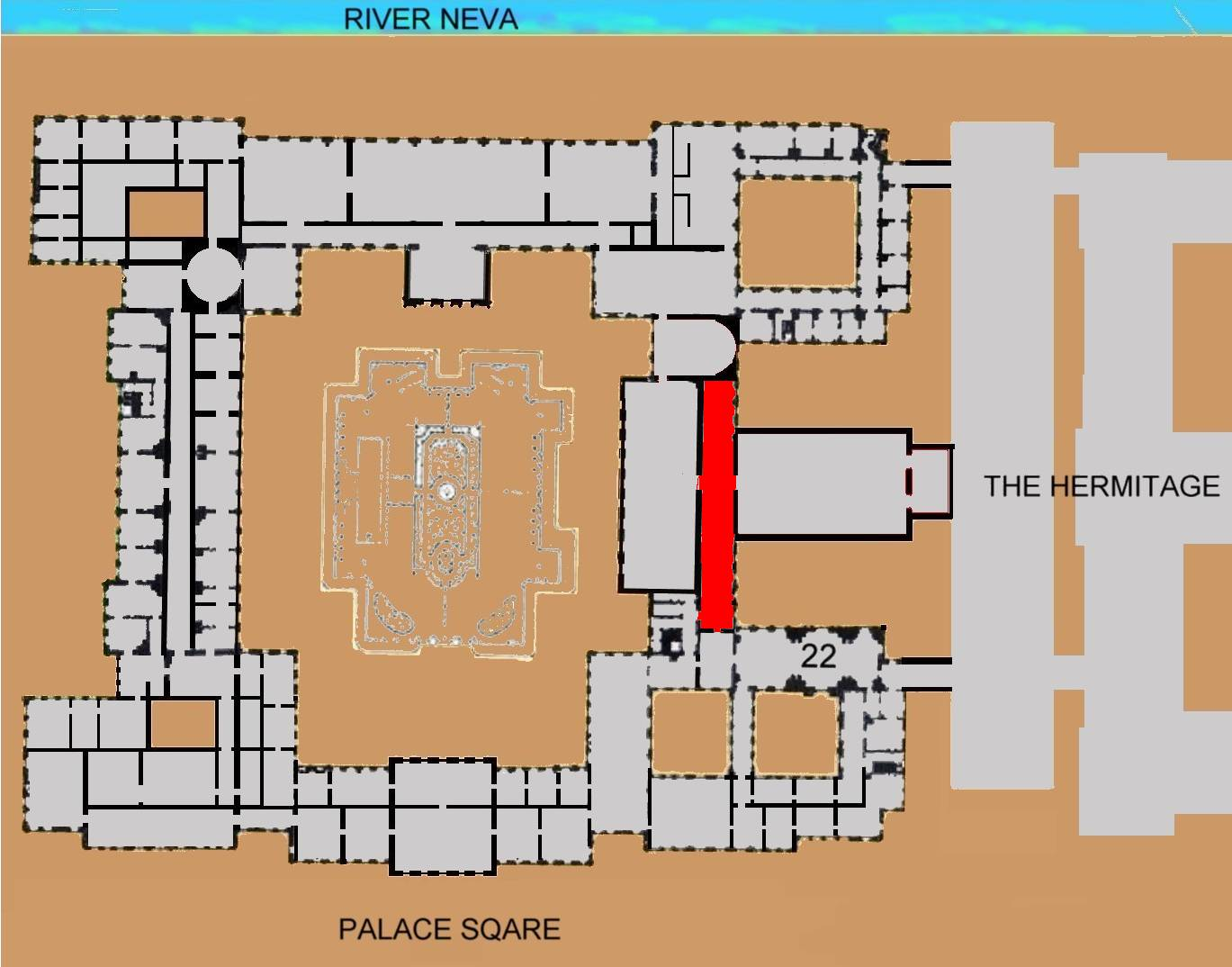
Plan showing the location of the Military Gallery within the palace

== Burning and reconstruction ==
Less than ten years after its completion, it was destroyed by fire in 1837. The fire burned slowly and Dawe's portraits were saved from the flames. The architect Vasily Stasov recreated the hall exactly as it had been before.

== Description by Littauer ==
As a cadet of the Nicholas Cavalry College, Vladimir Littauer was posted in 1912 to stand night-time guard in the Military Gallery. He describes the experience as an eerie one, standing under the rows of portraits in the "huge hall" lit only by a single bulb over a cluster of banners. The isolation of the solitary sentry was emphasized by the two to three minutes that footsteps could be heard down halls and corridors before the replacement guard arrived in the gallery.

== Soviet additions ==
During the Soviet era, the gallery collection was enhanced by four portraits of Palace Grenadiers, the special ceremonial unit created in 1827 from veterans of the Patriotic War of 1812 to guard the entire building. The portraits were also painted by George Dawe, in 1828. More recently, the gallery acquired two paintings by Peter von Hess from the 1840s.

== Museum exhibit ==
Today, as part of the Hermitage Museum, this room retains its original decoration. Copies by Dawe and his workshop of the portraits of Boris Vladimirovich Poluektov, Dmitry Vladimirovich Golitsyn and Boris Vladimirovich Poluektov are now in the collection of the Pushkin Museum.

== Gallery ==
Monarchs

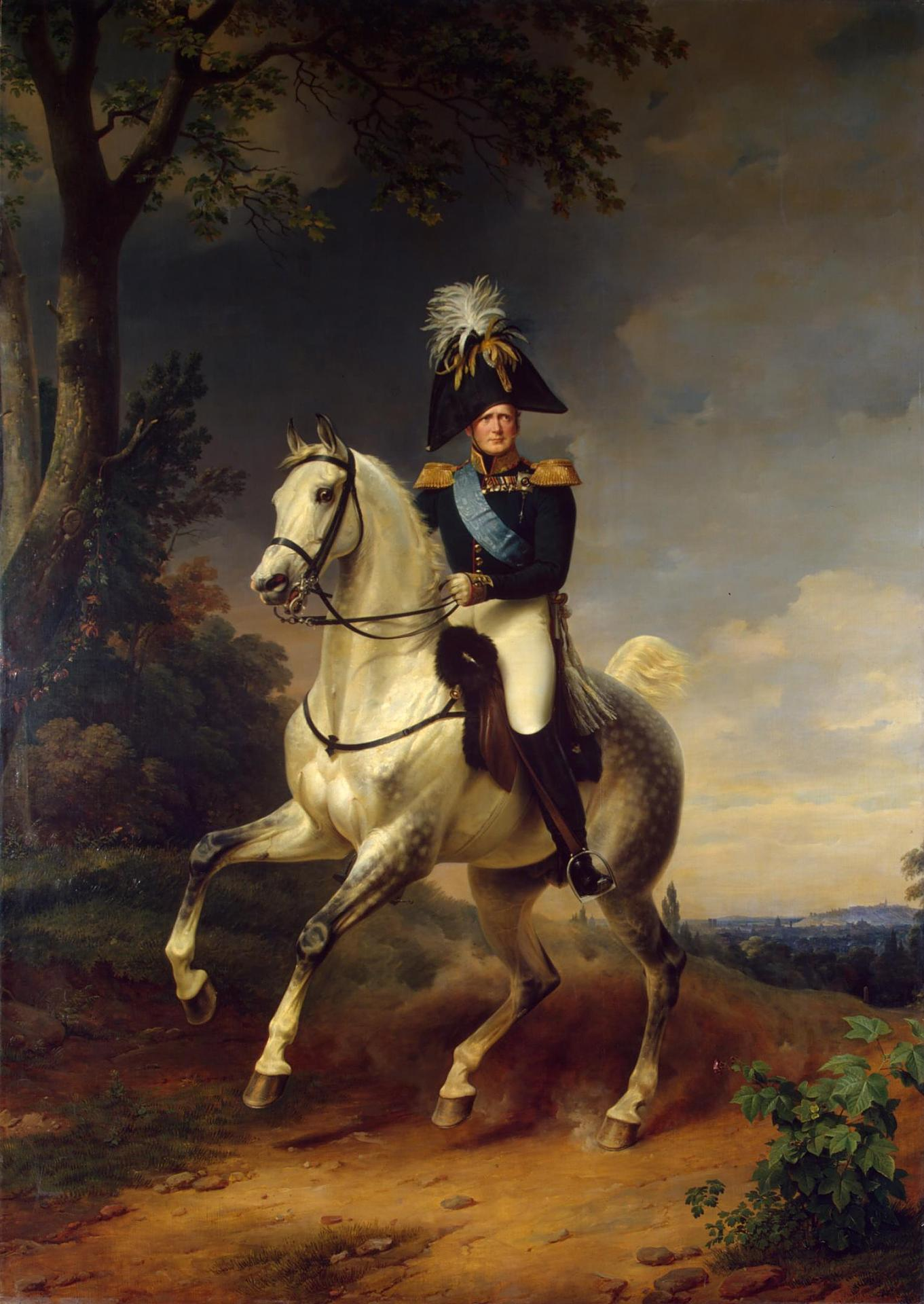
Alexander I of Russia

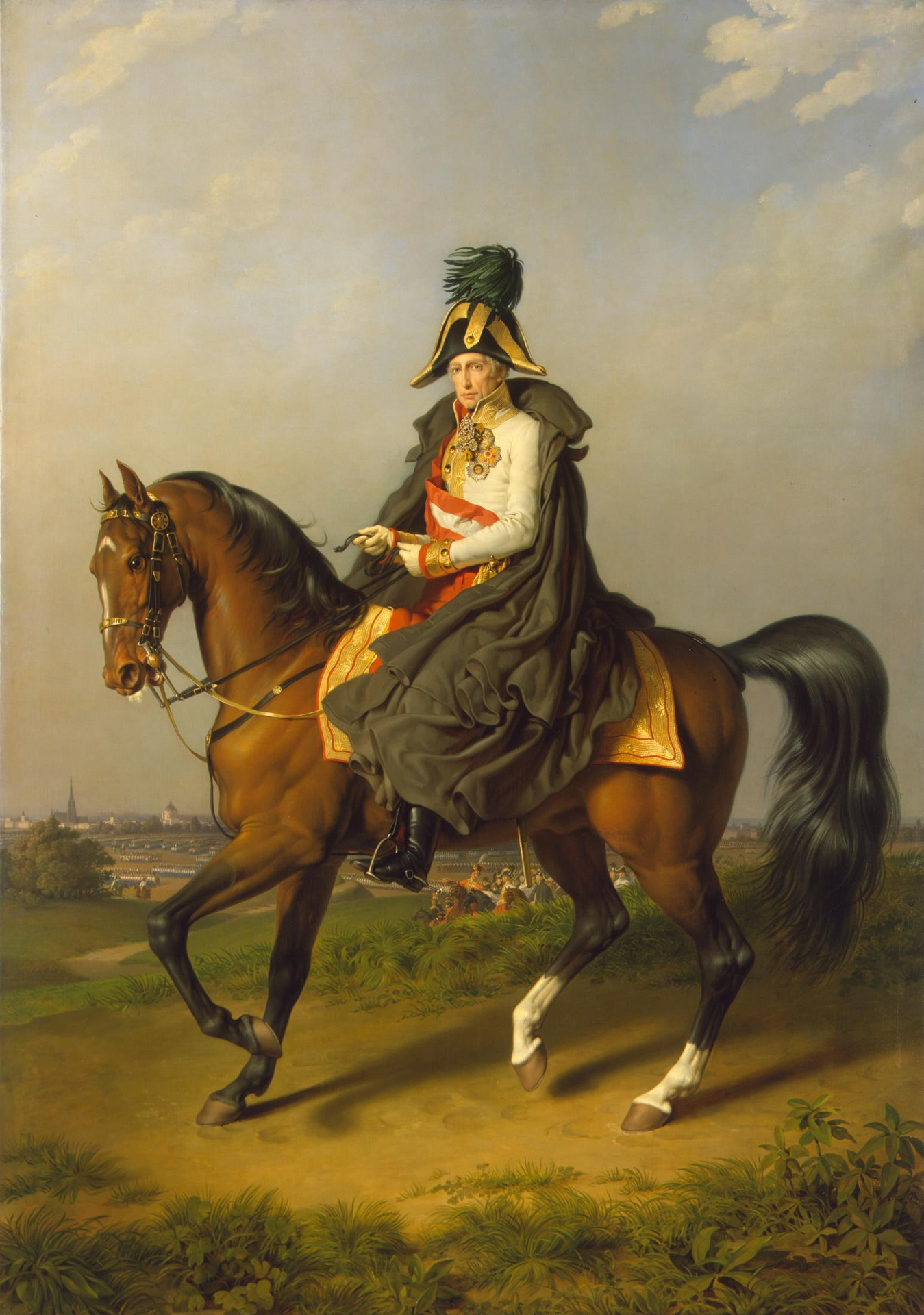
Francis II of Austria

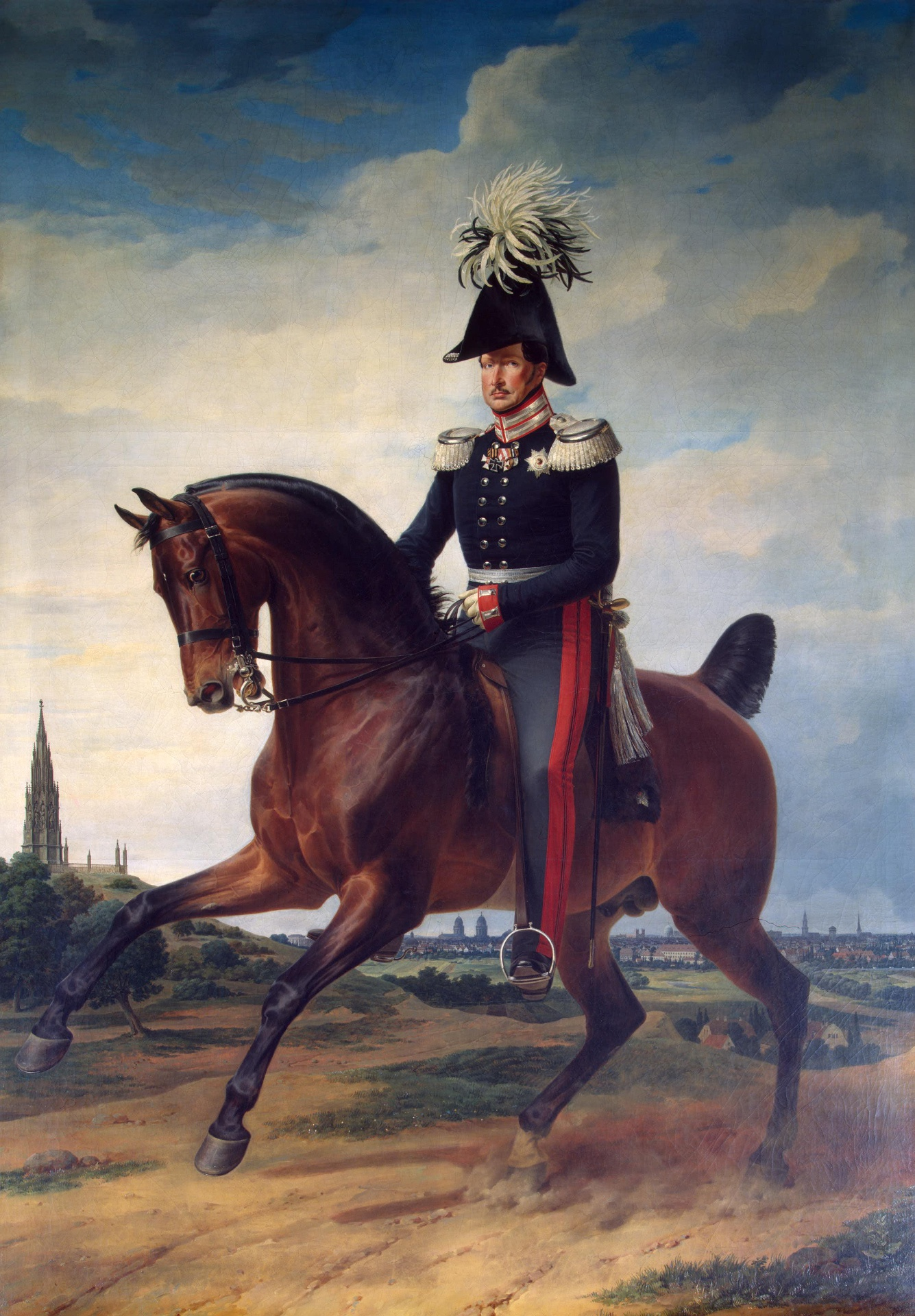
Frederick William III of Prussia
Generals

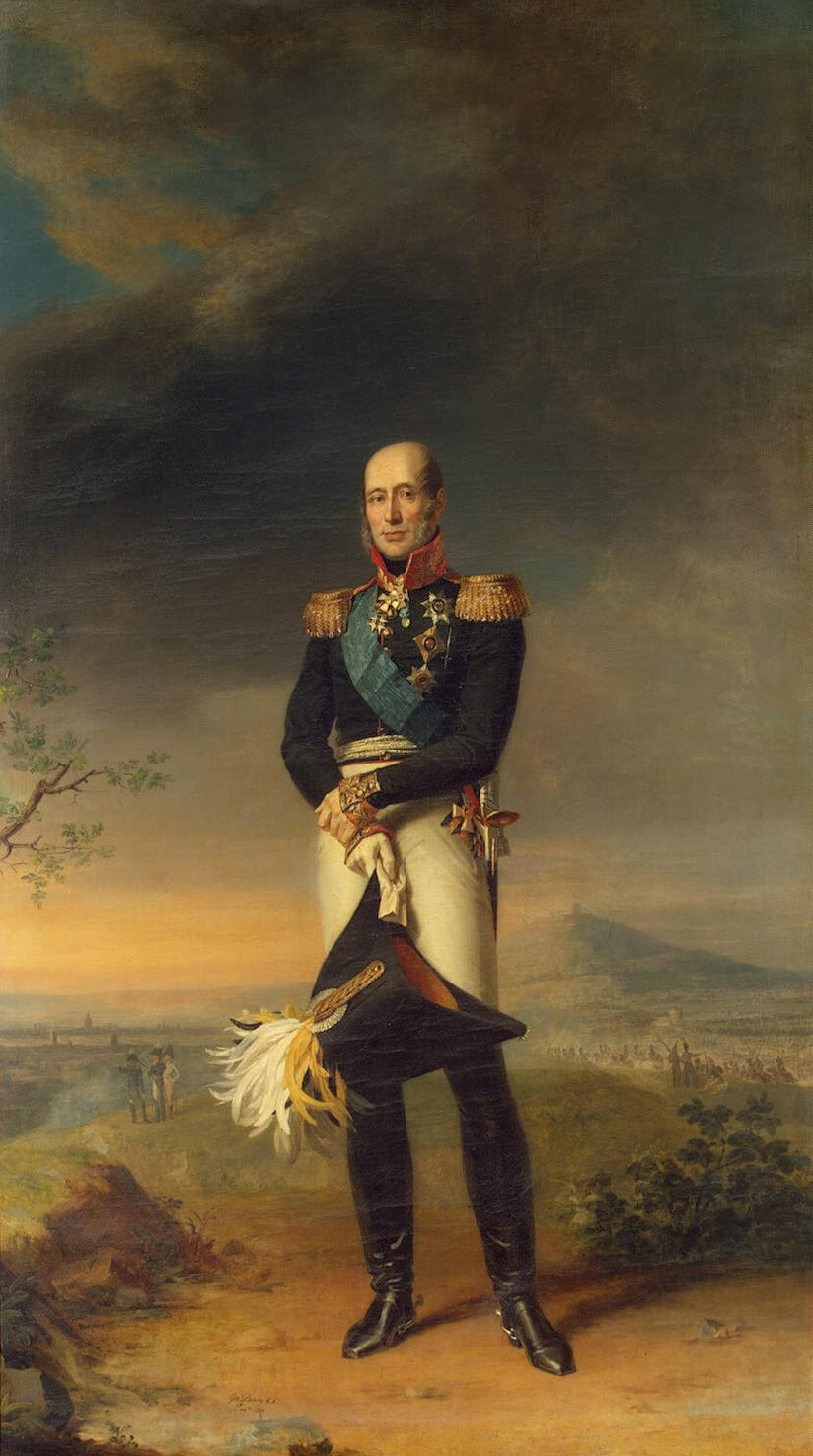
Michael Andreas Barclay de Tolly

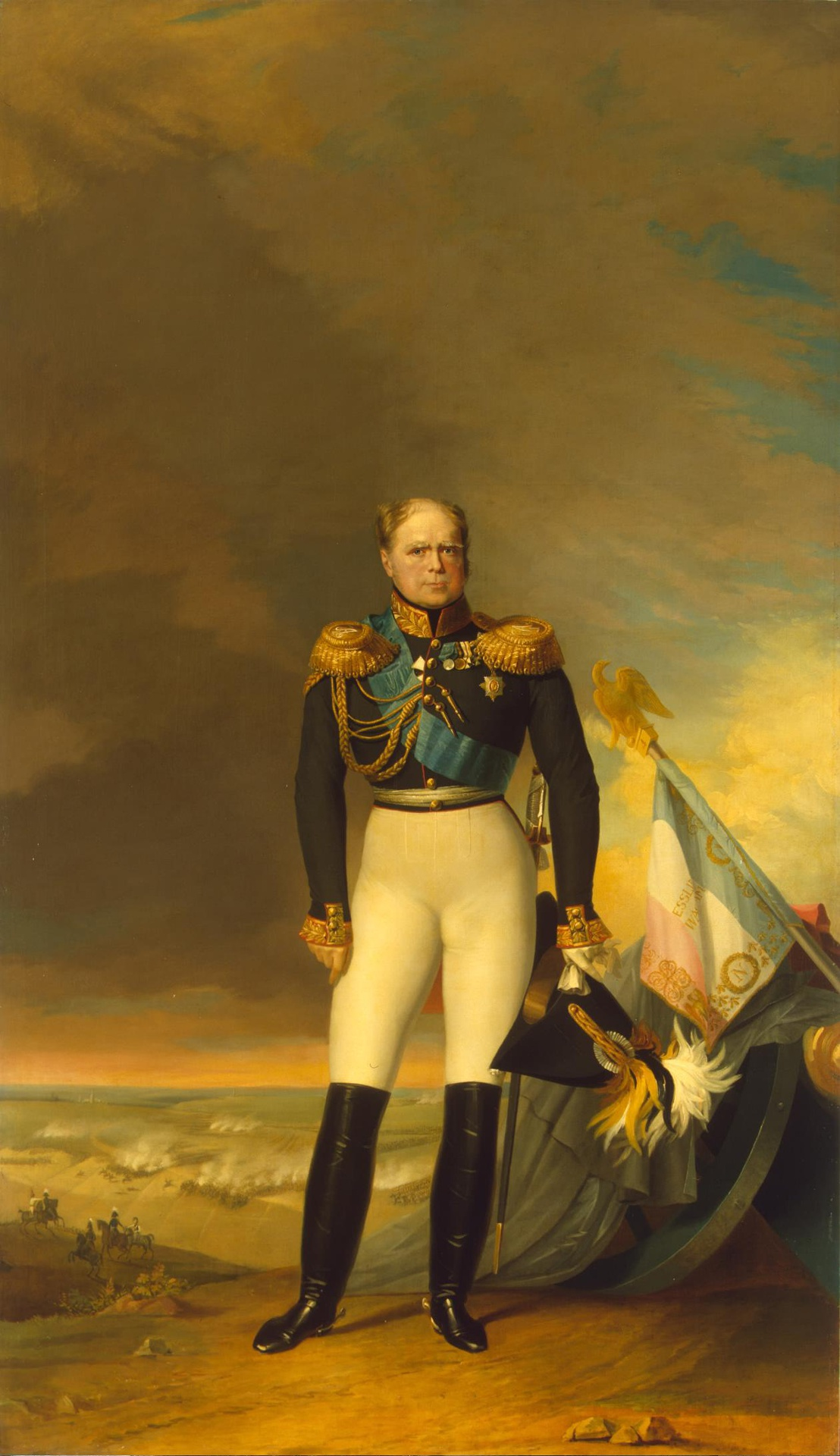
Grand Duke Constantine Pavlovich of Russia

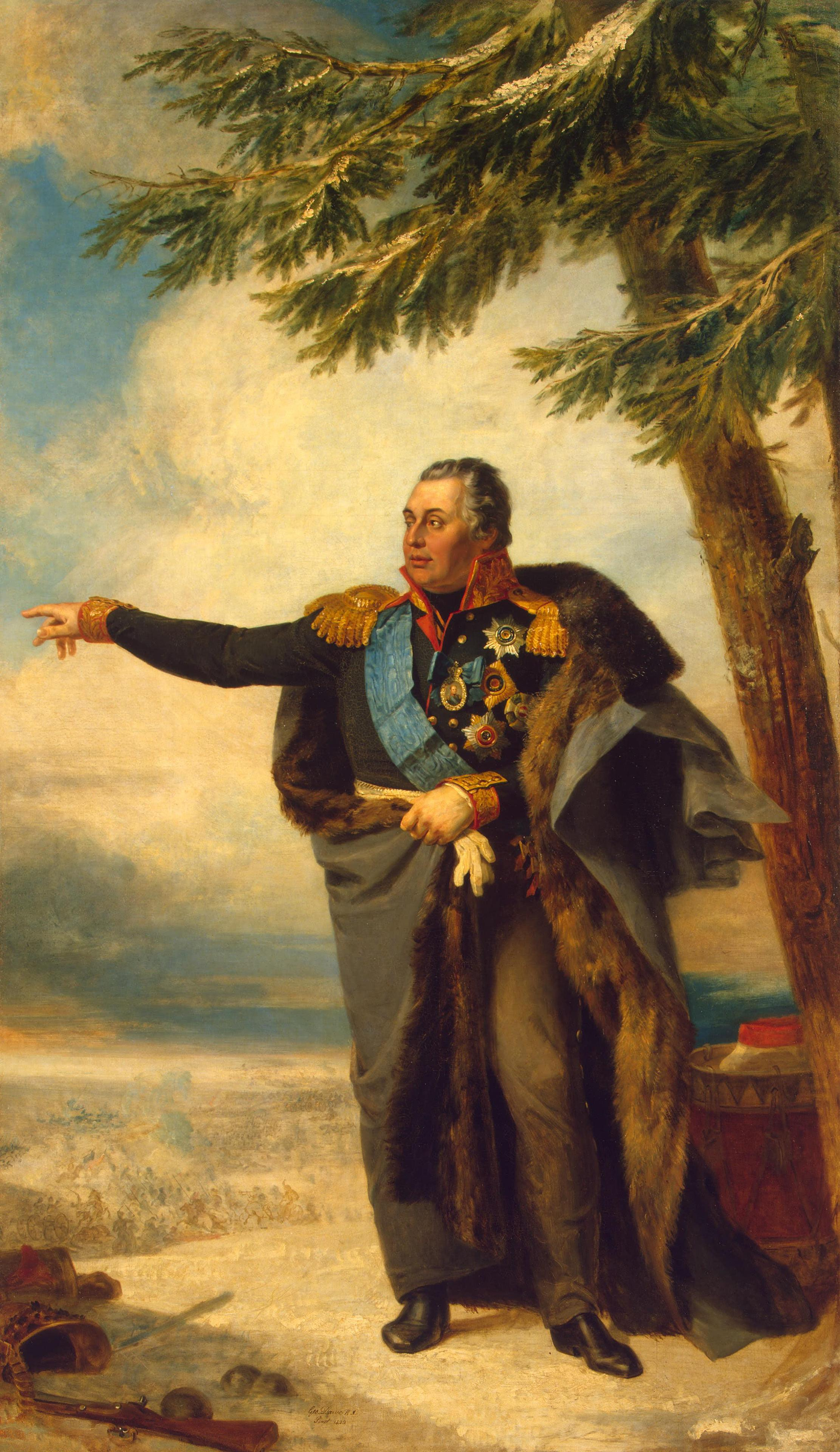
Mikhail Kutuzov

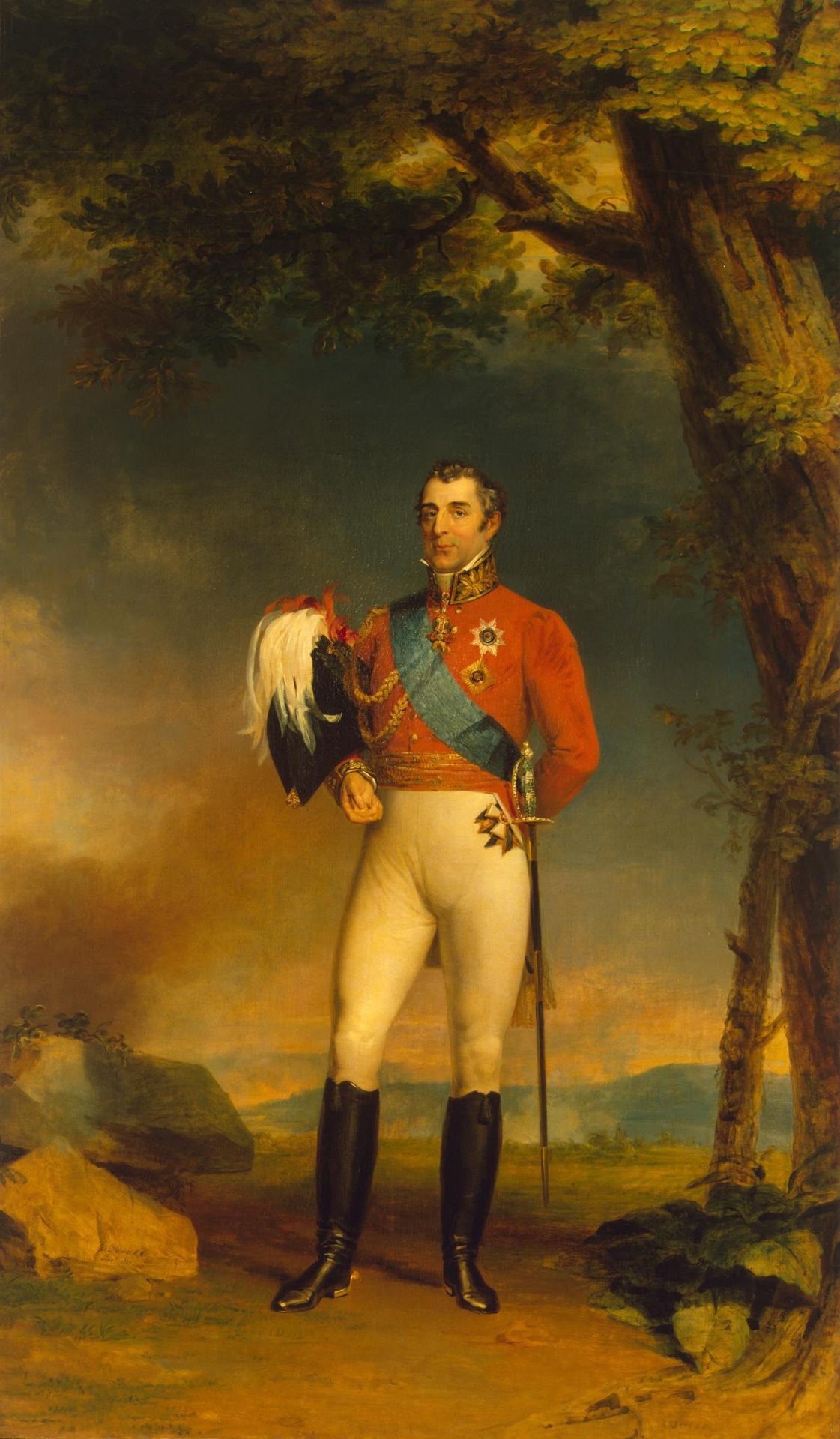
Arthur Wellesley, 1st Duke of Wellington

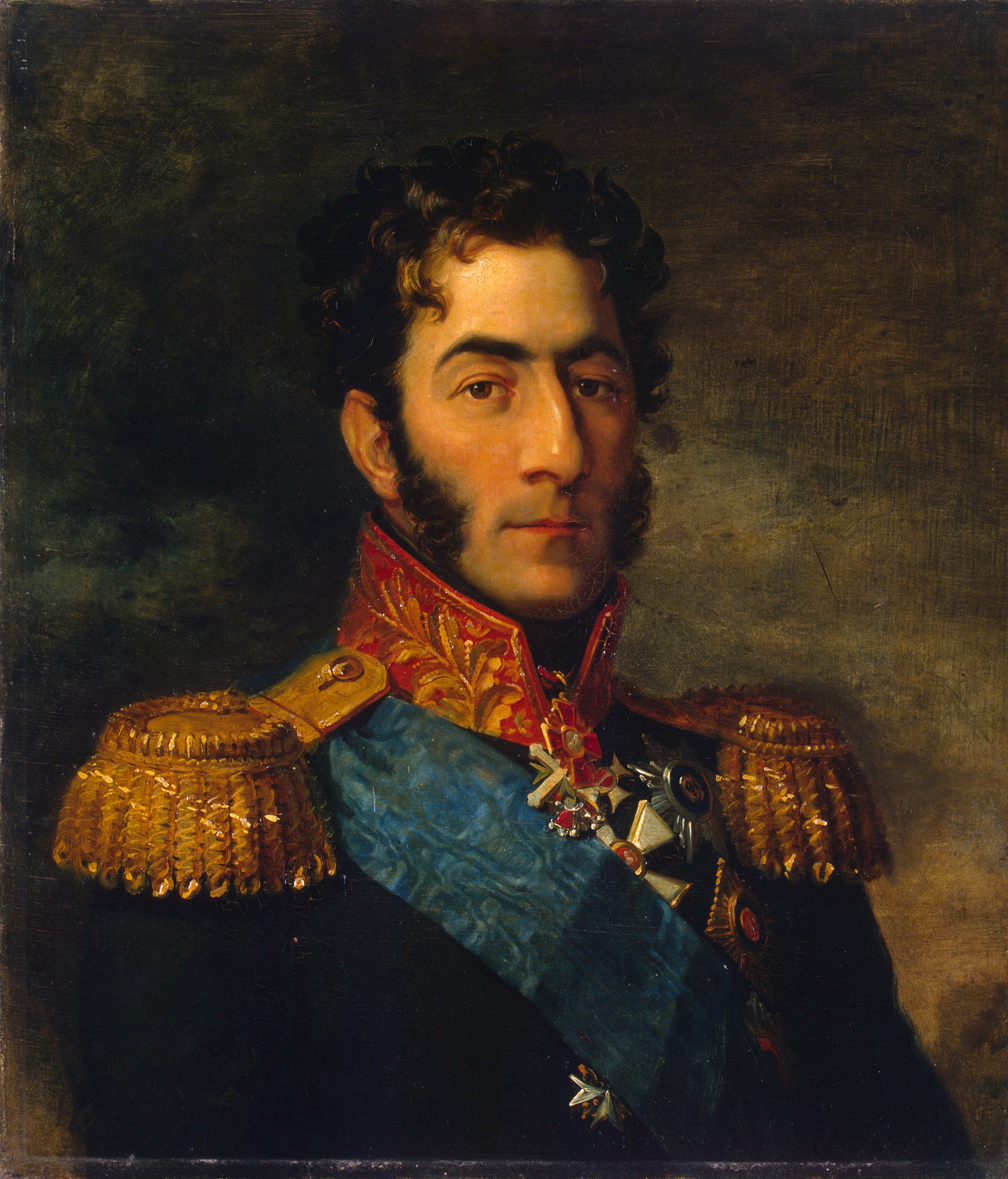
Pyotr Bagration

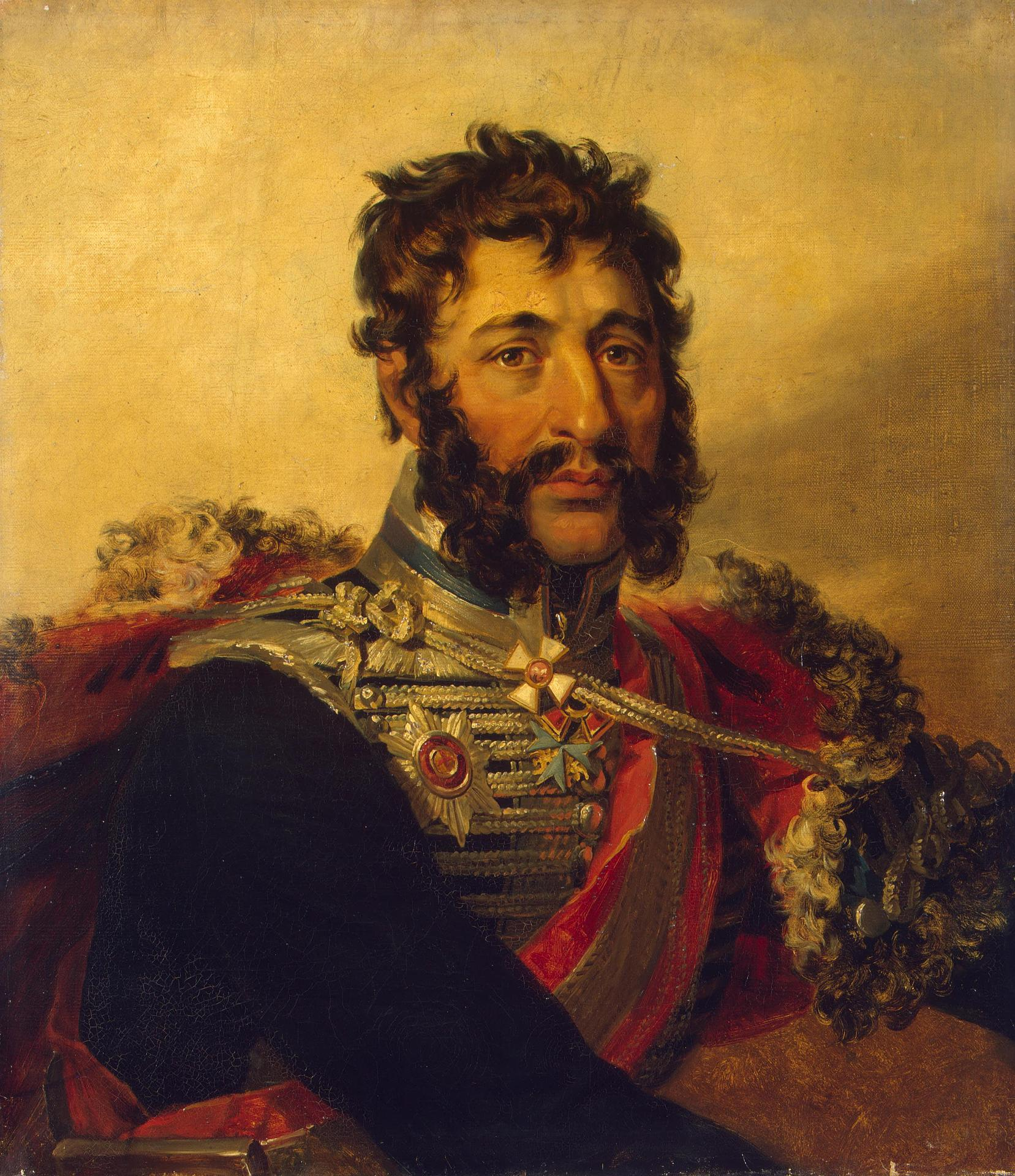
Yakov Kulnev

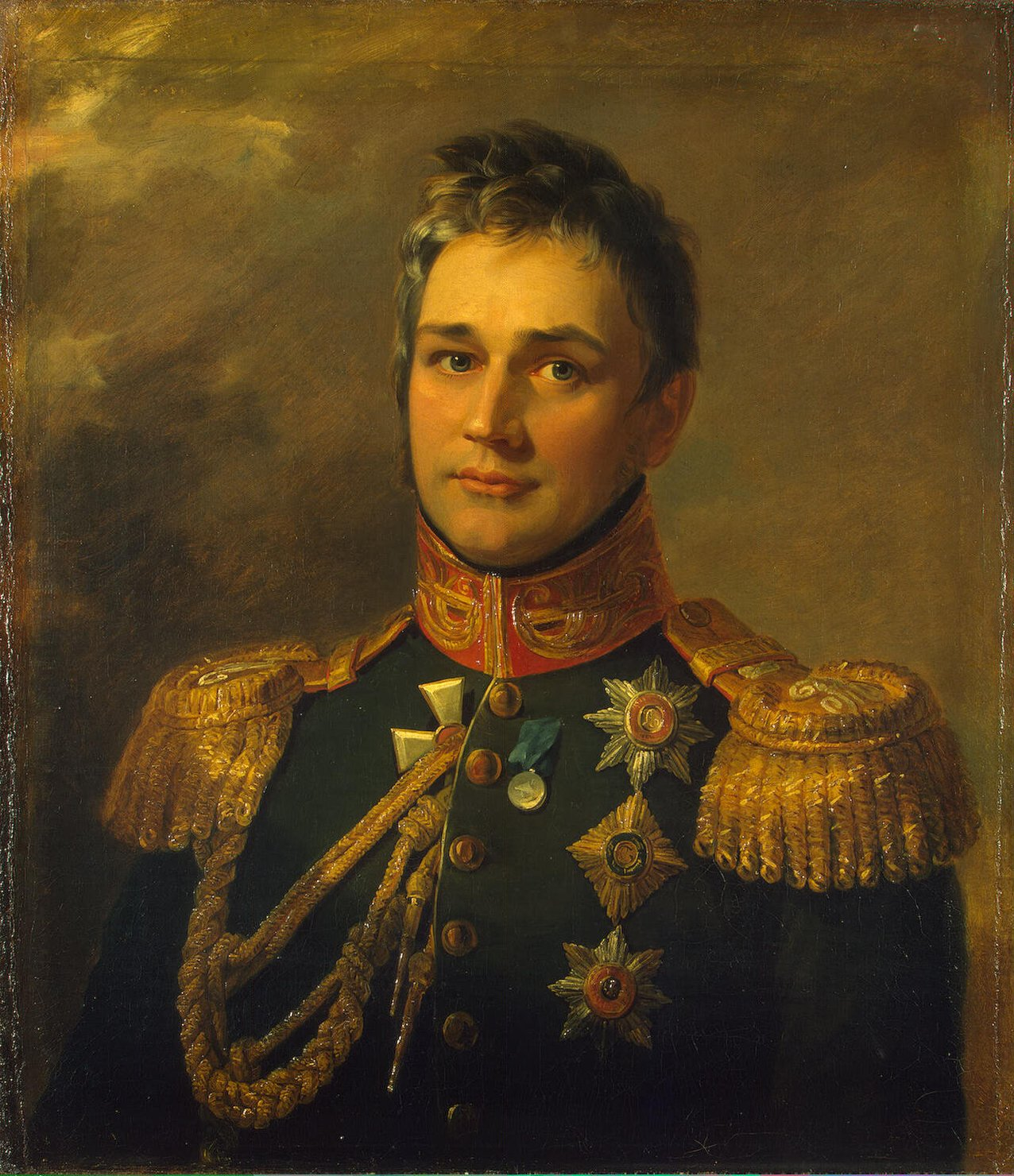
Mikhail Vorontsov

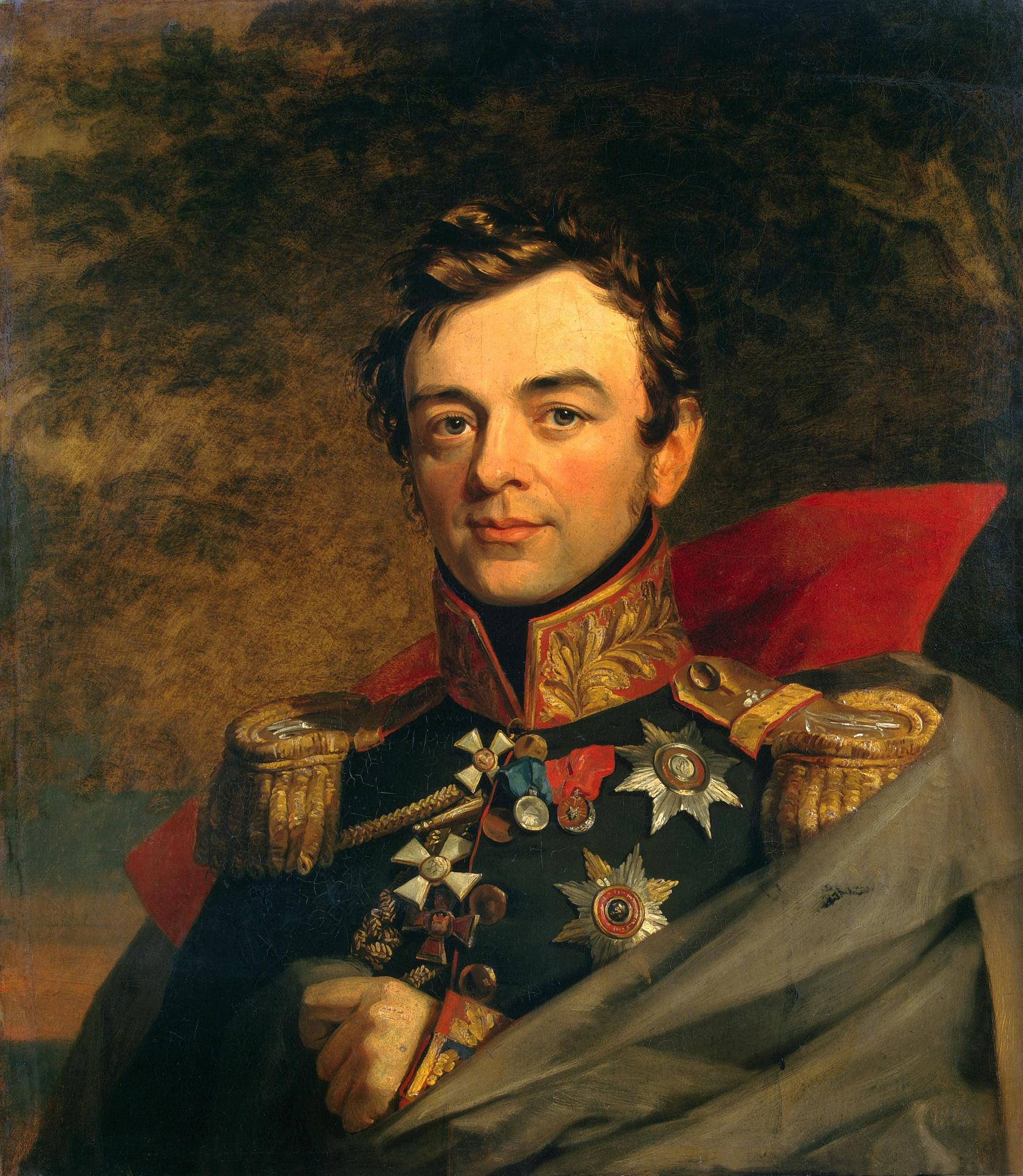
Ivan Paskevich

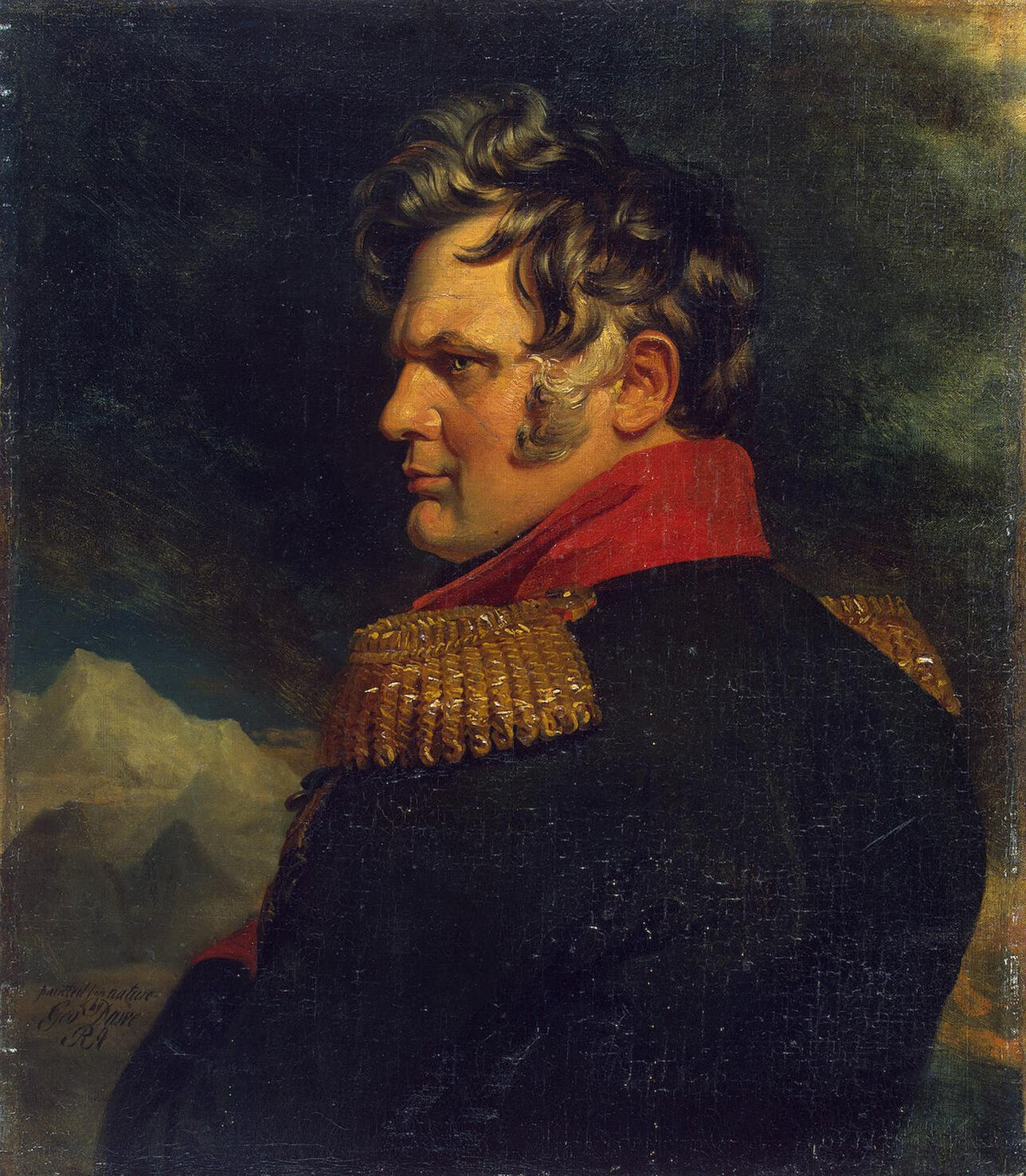
Aleksey Yermolov

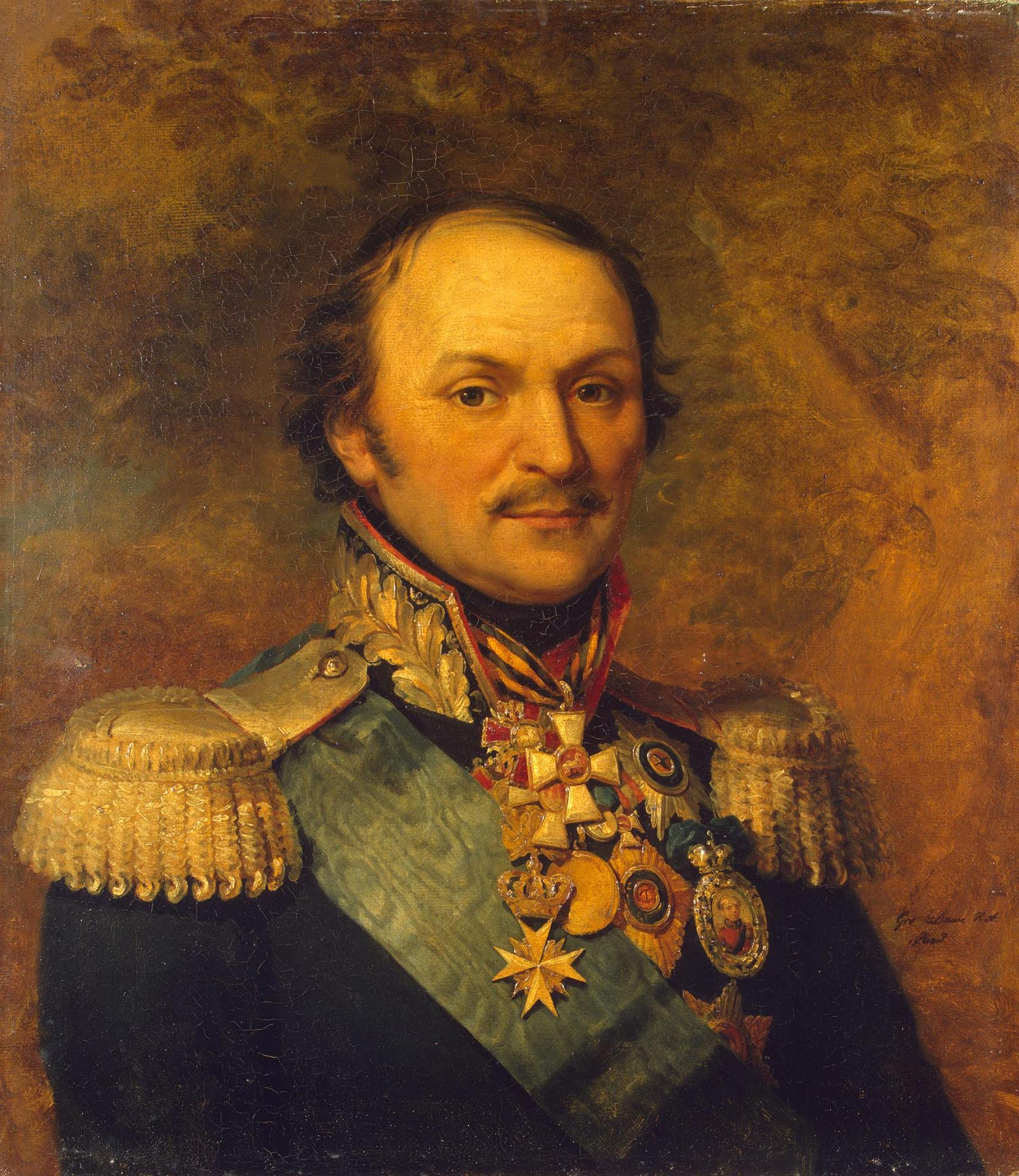
Matvey Platov

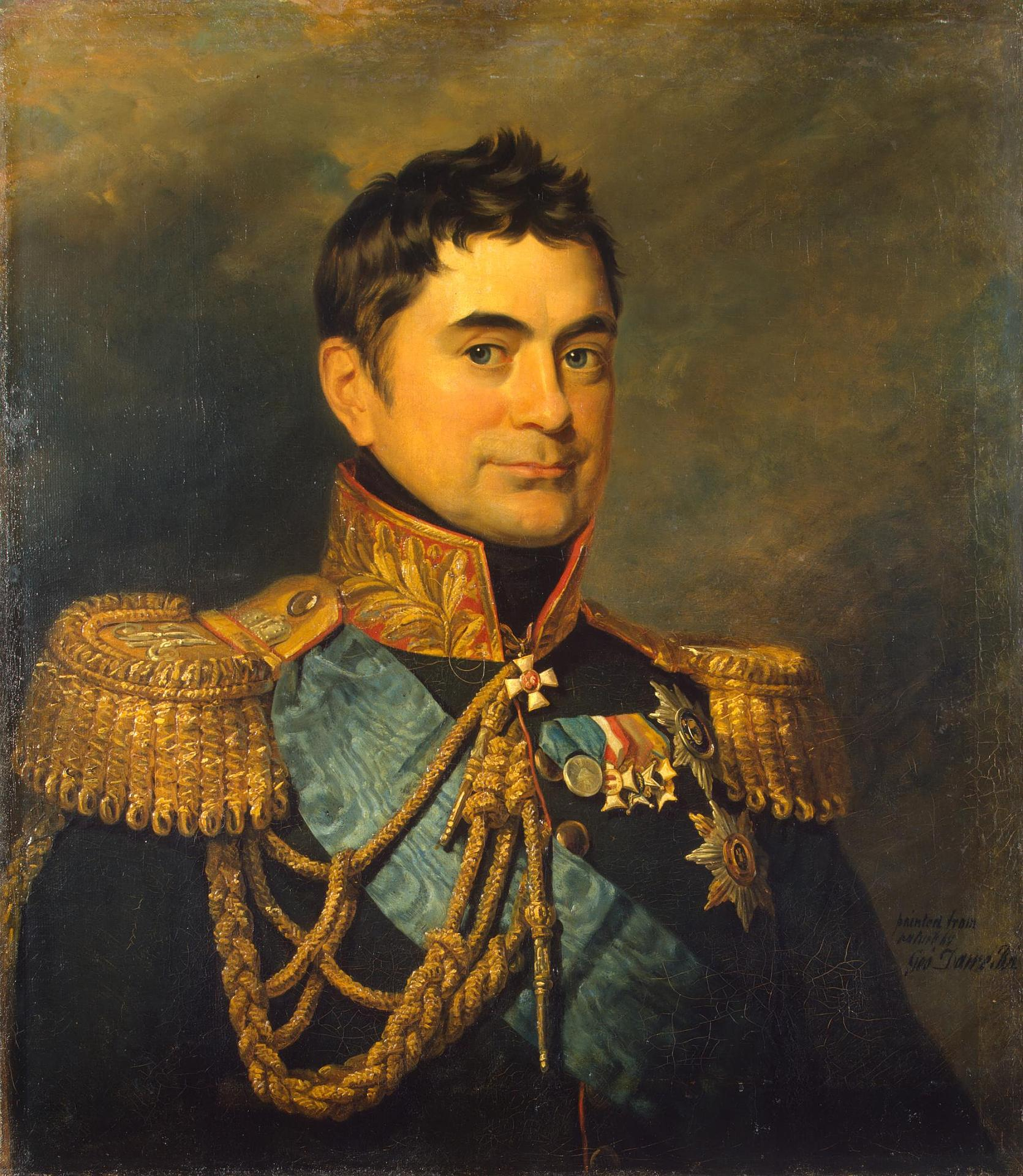
Peter Volkonsky

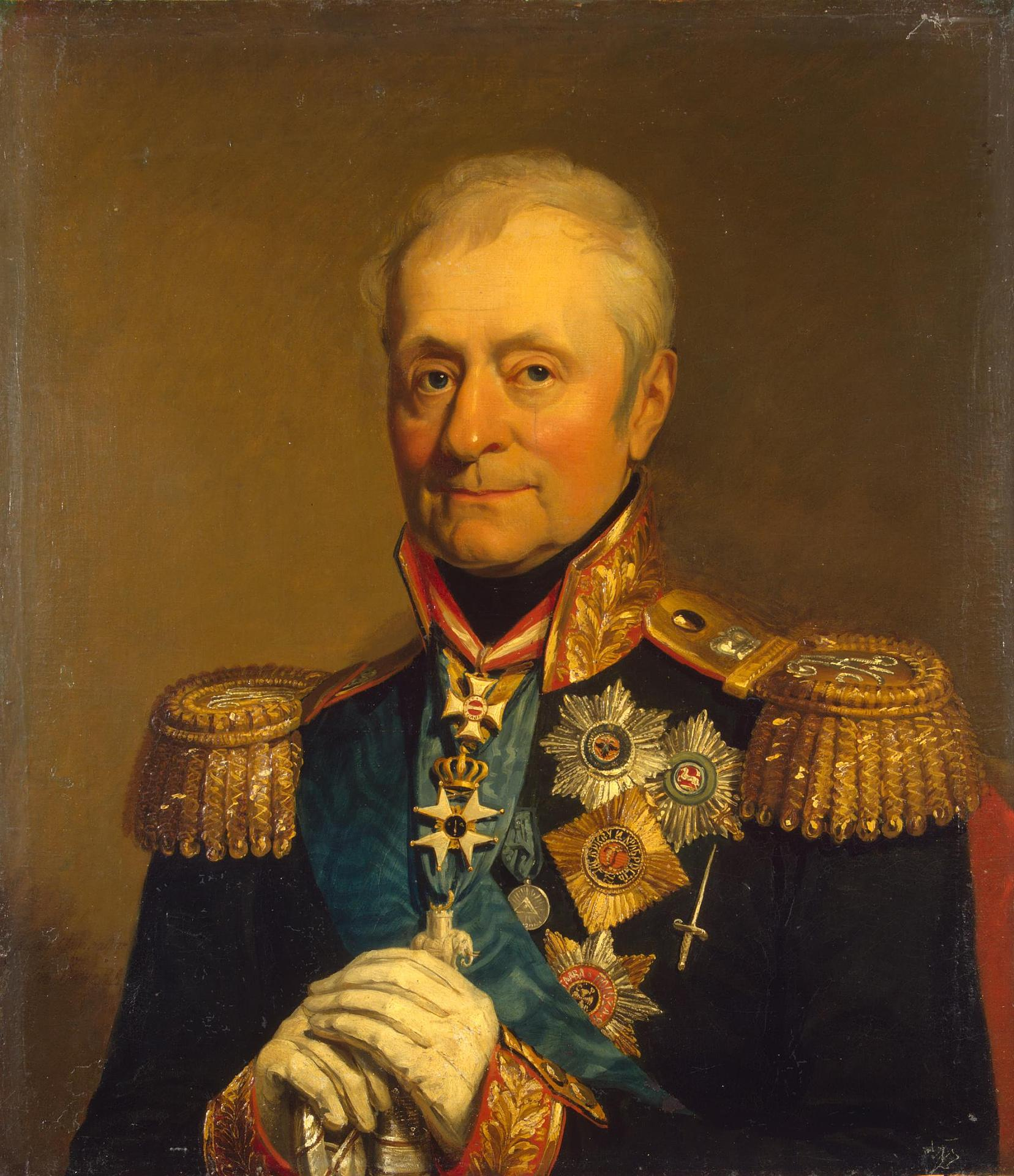
Levin August von Bennigsen

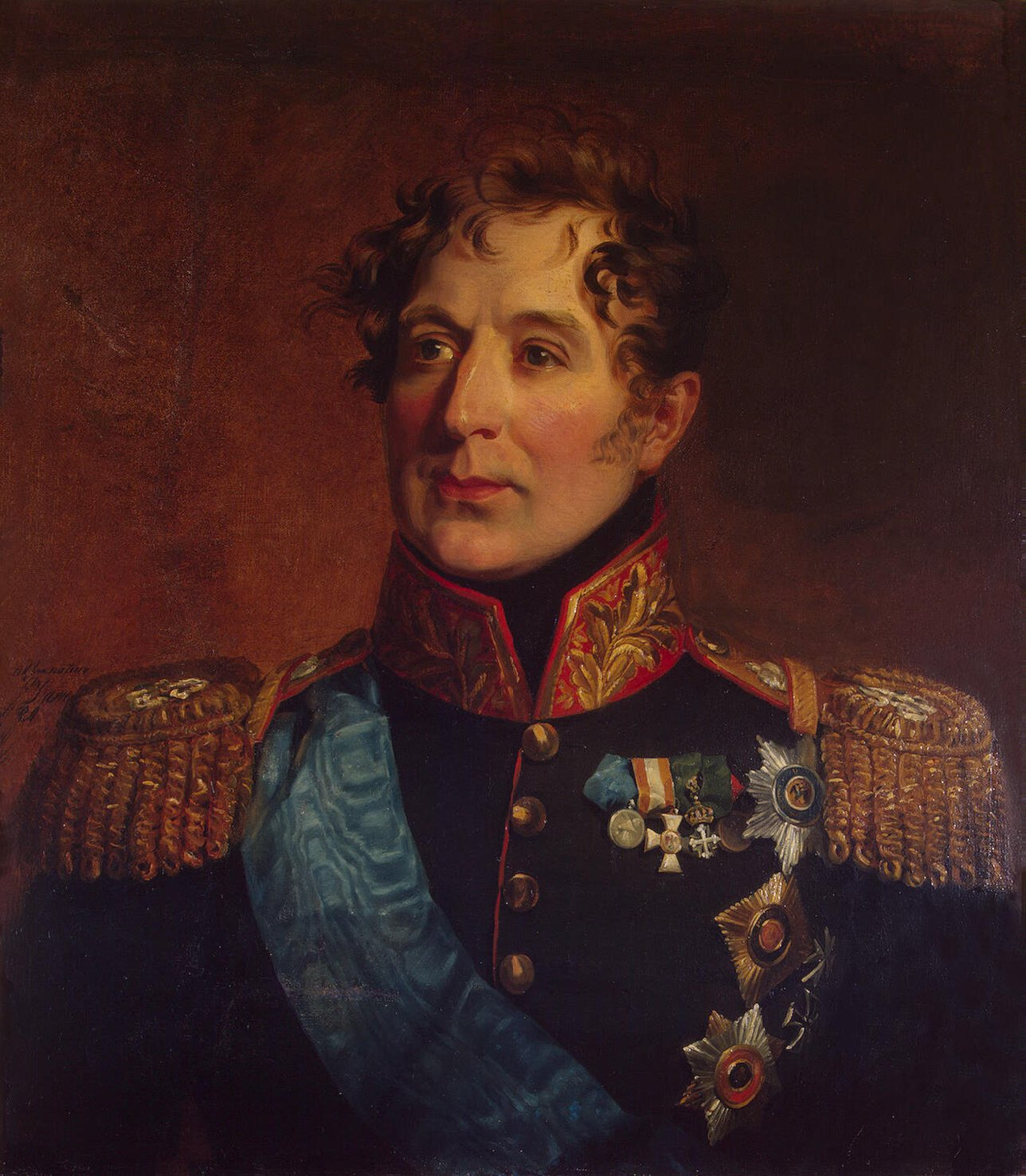
Mikhail Miloradovich

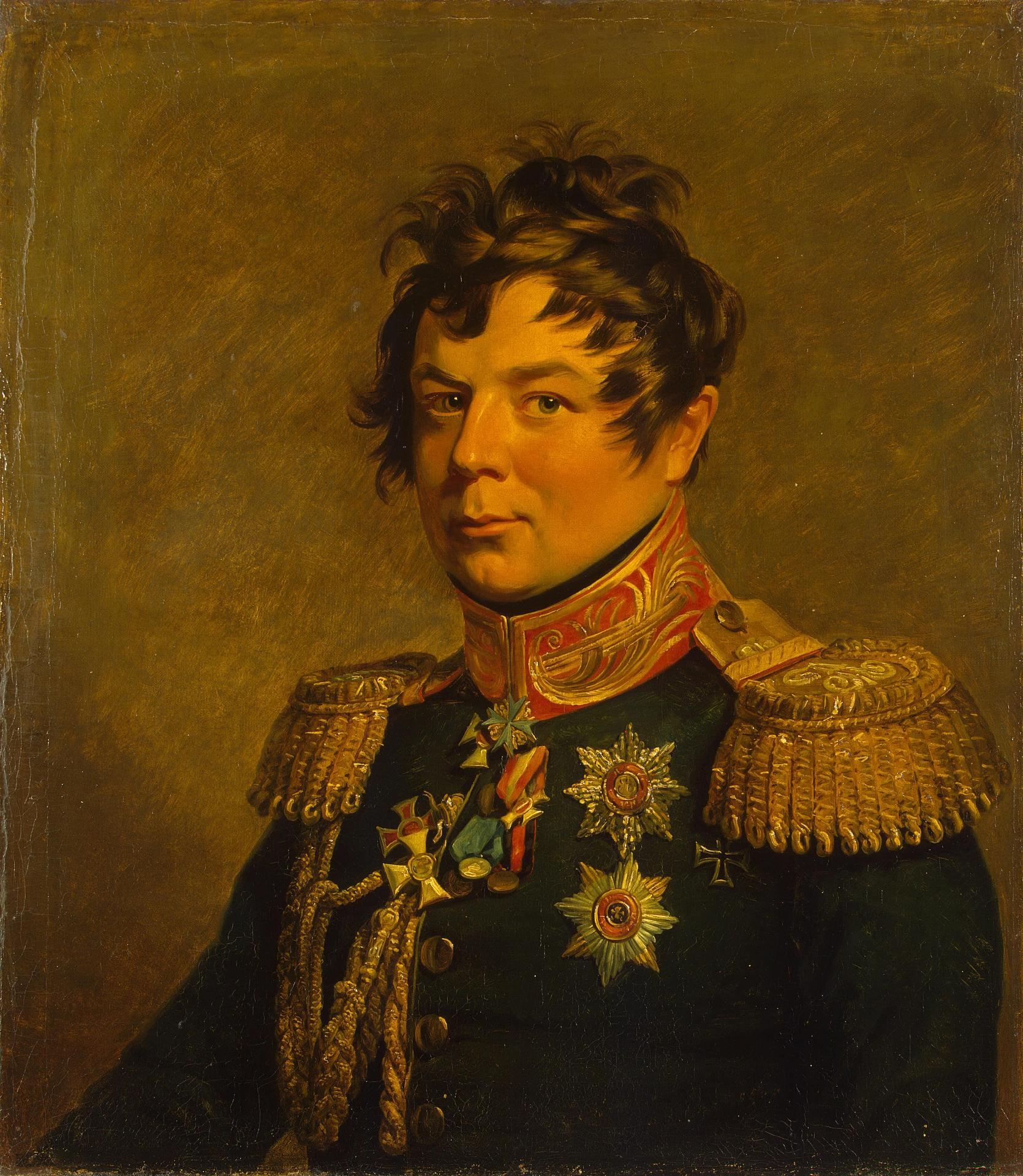
Hans Karl von Diebitsch

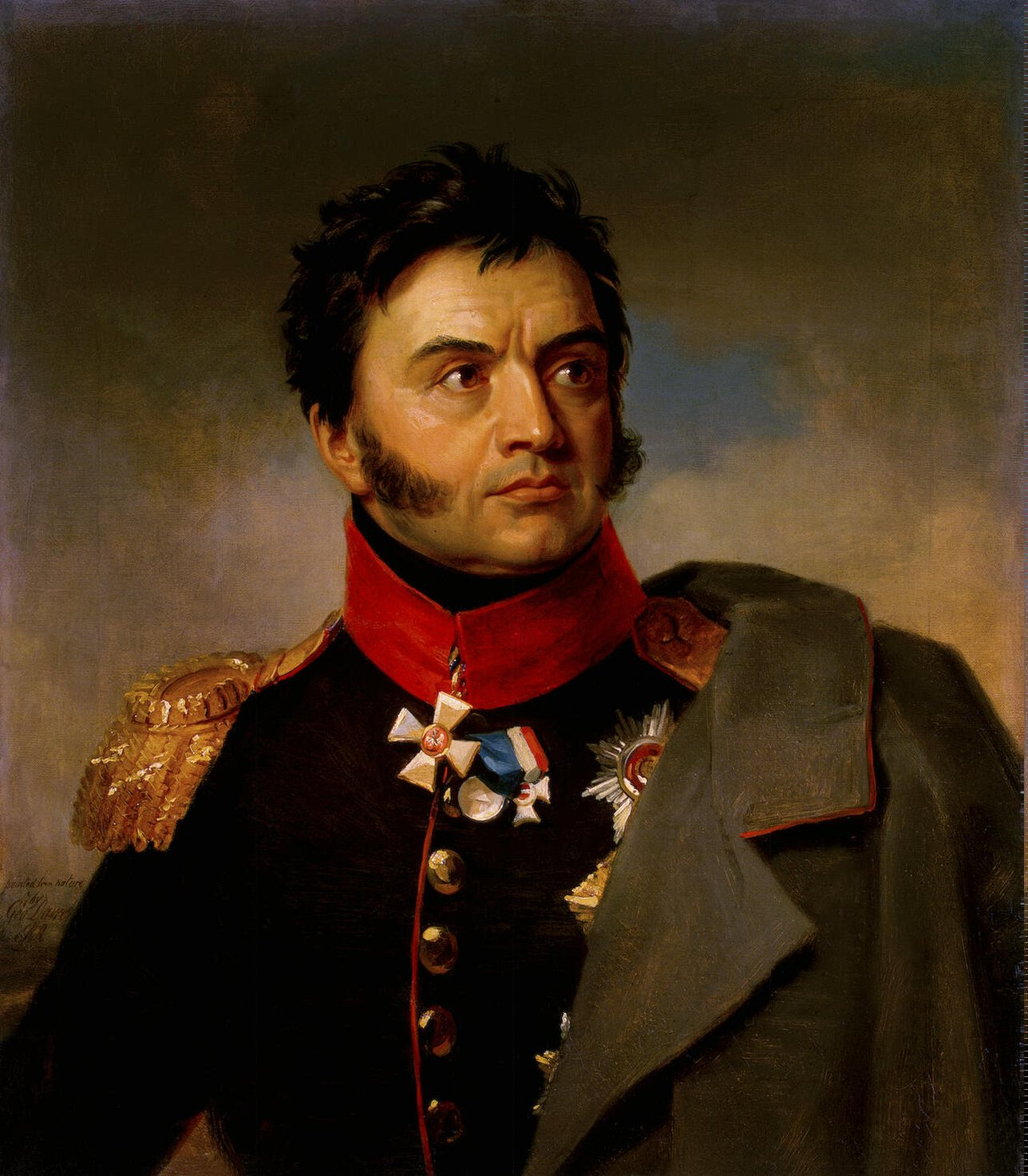
Nikolay Raevsky

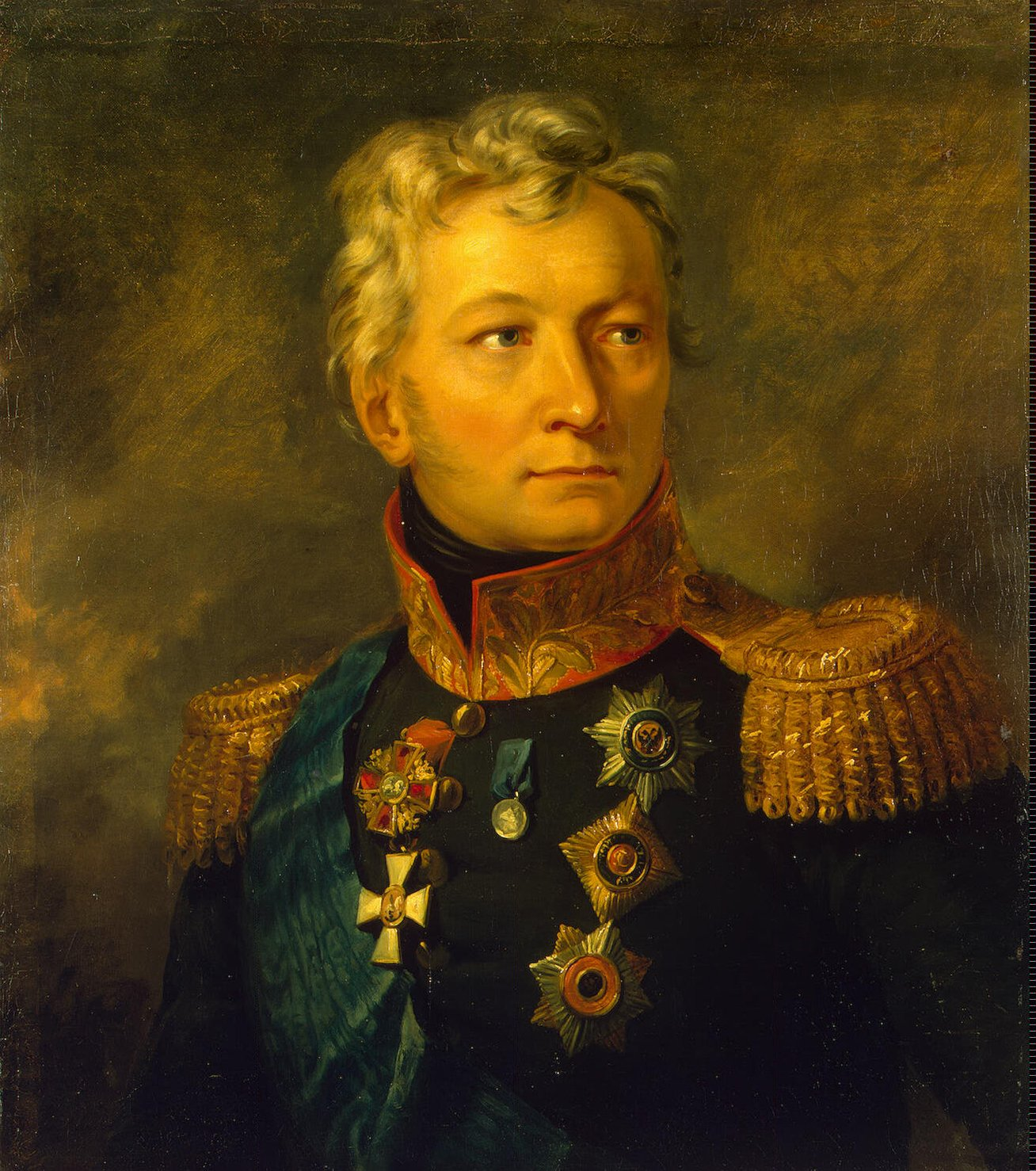
Alexander Tormasov

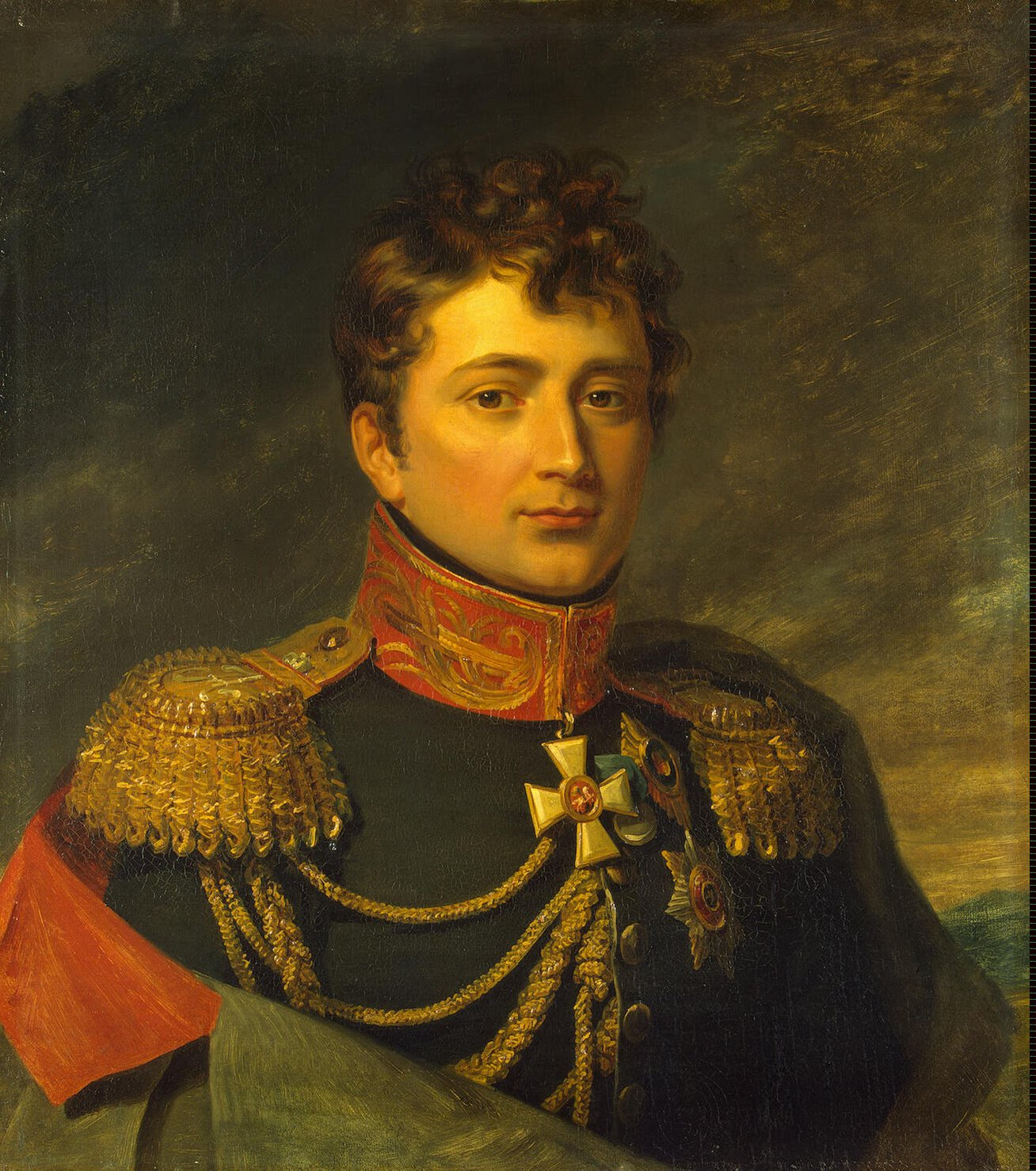
Guillaume de Saint-Priest

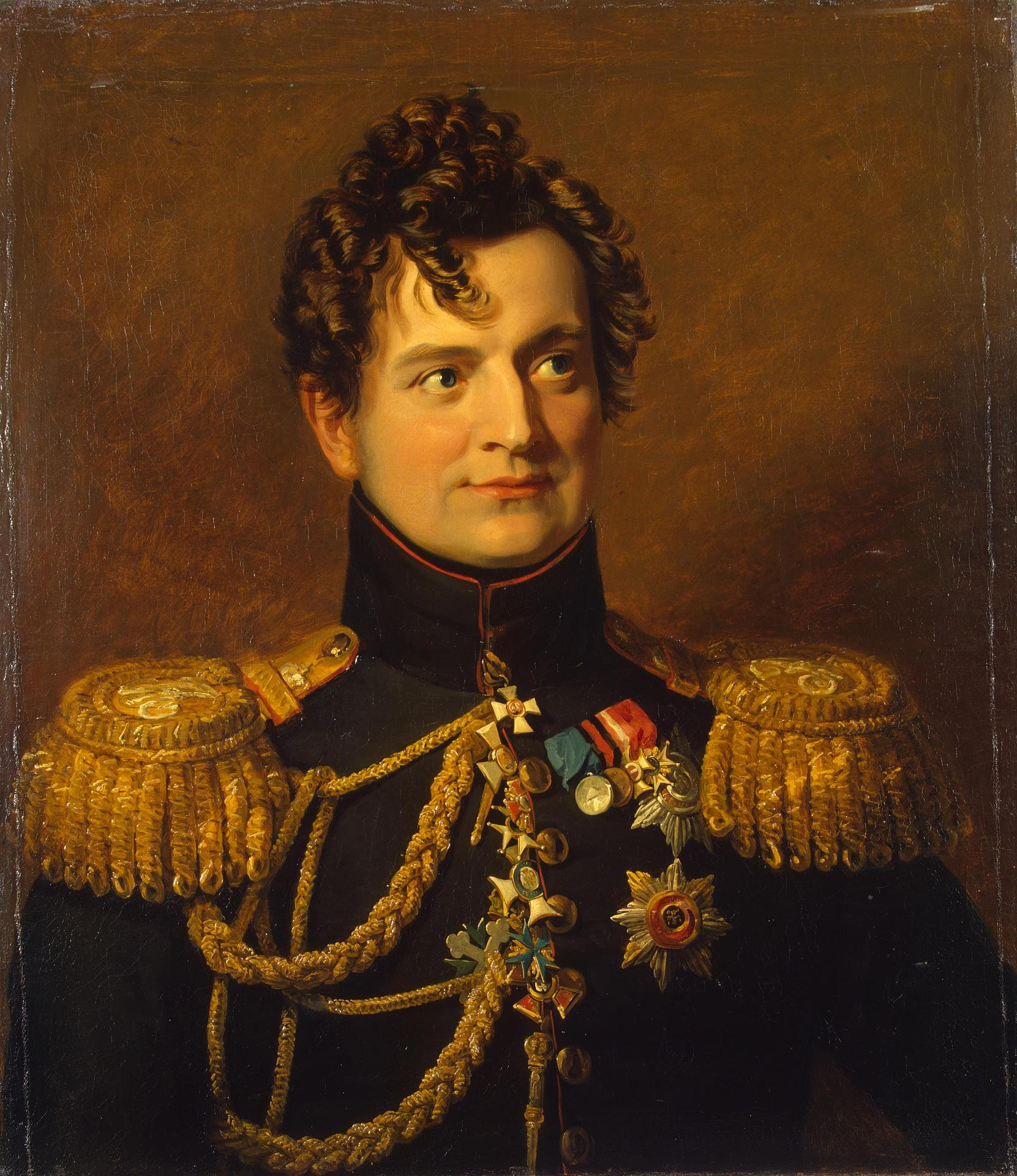
Adam Ożarowski

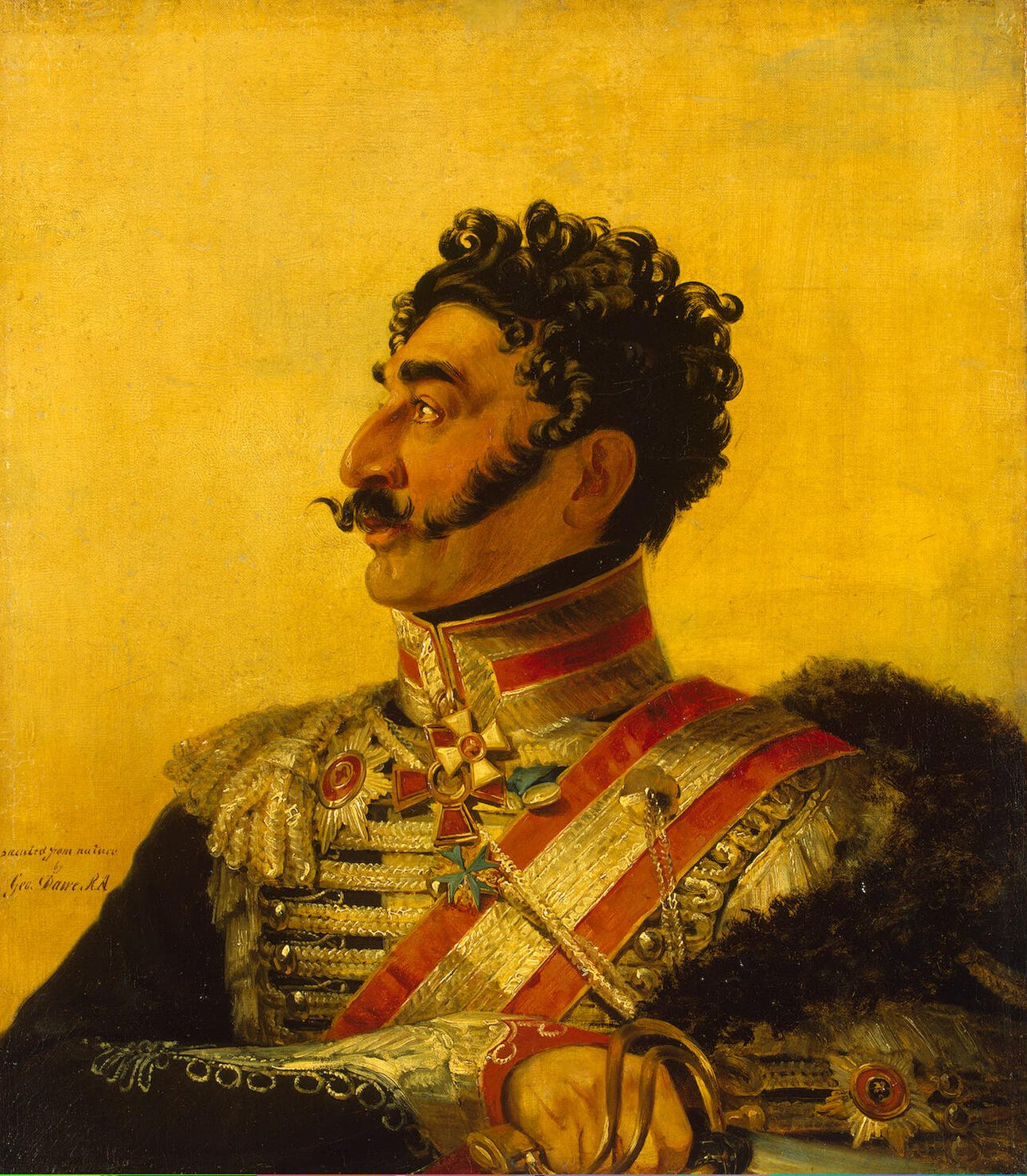
Valerian Madatov

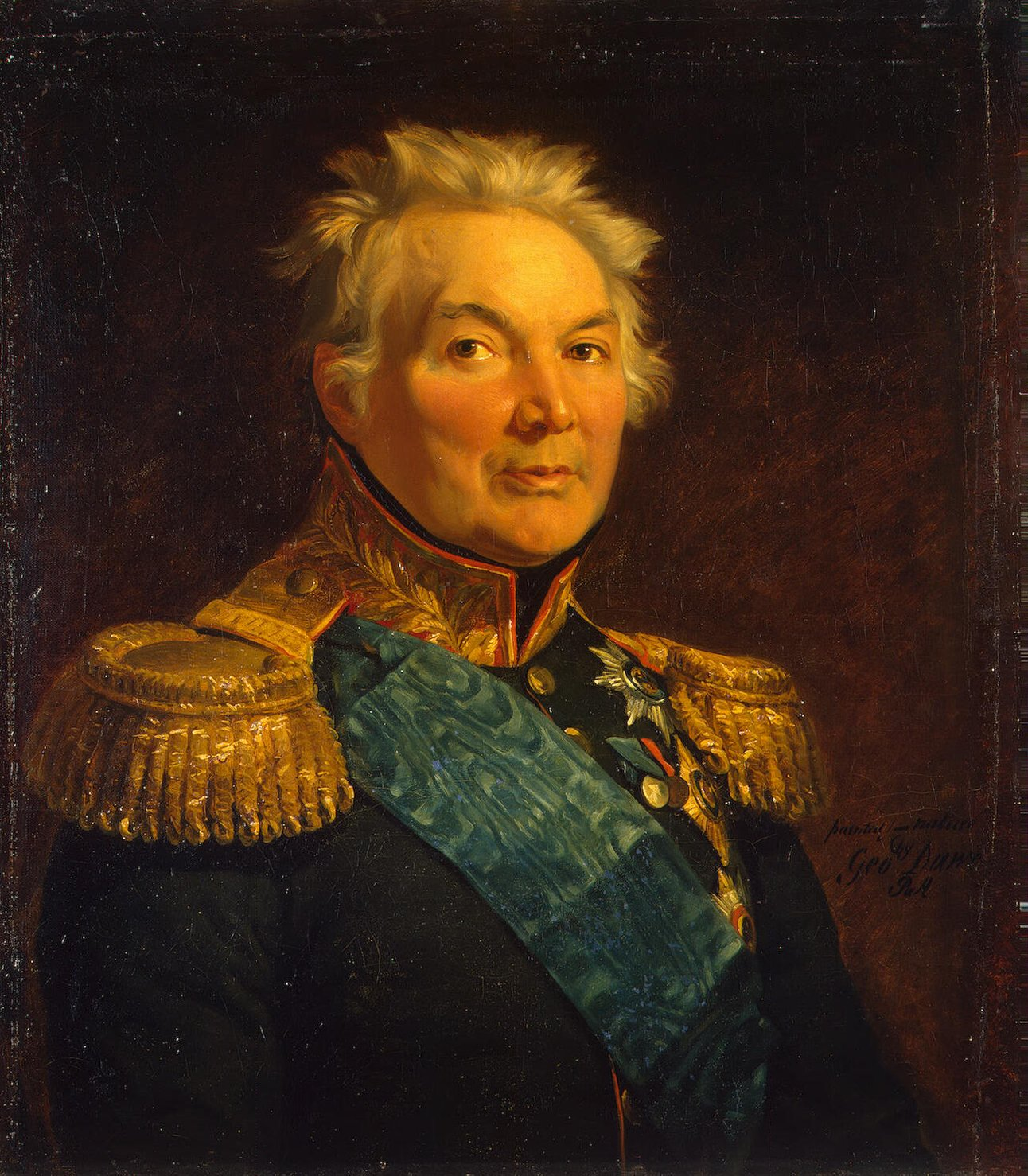
Fabian Wilhelm von Osten-Sacken

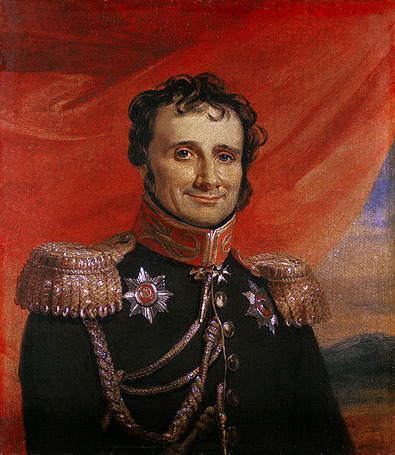
Antoine-Henri Jomini

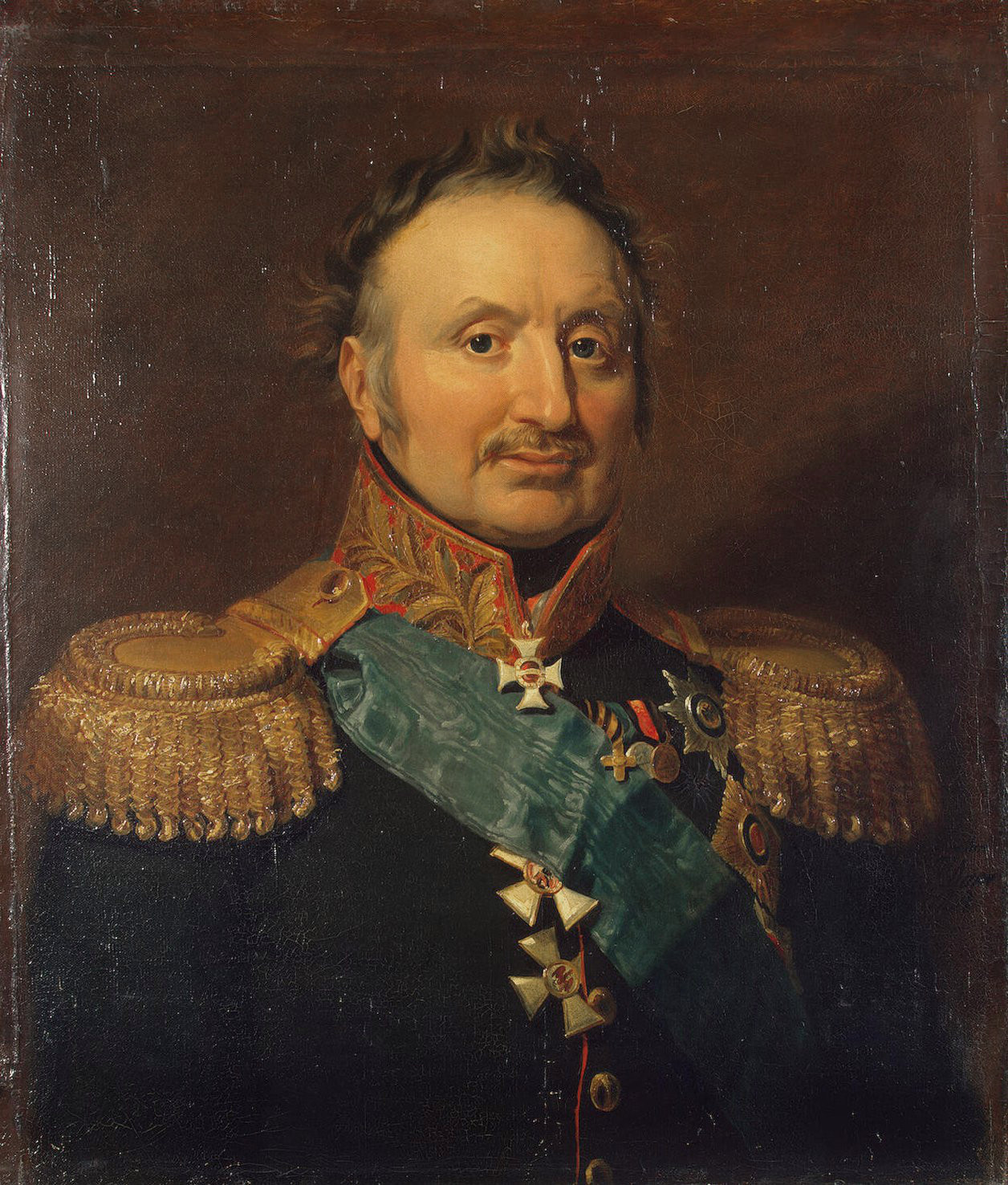
Peter Wittgenstein

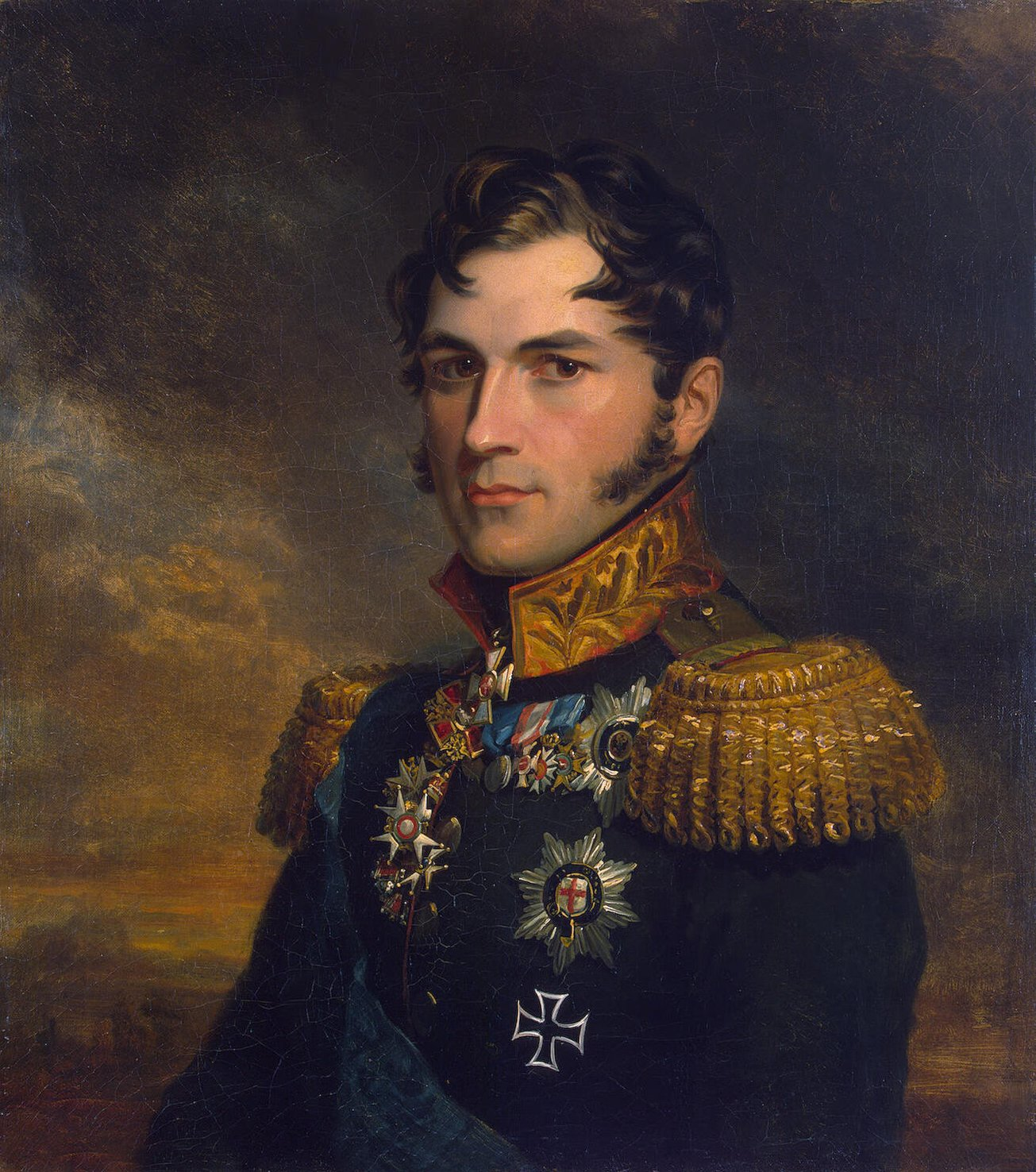
Leopold von Saxen-Koburg

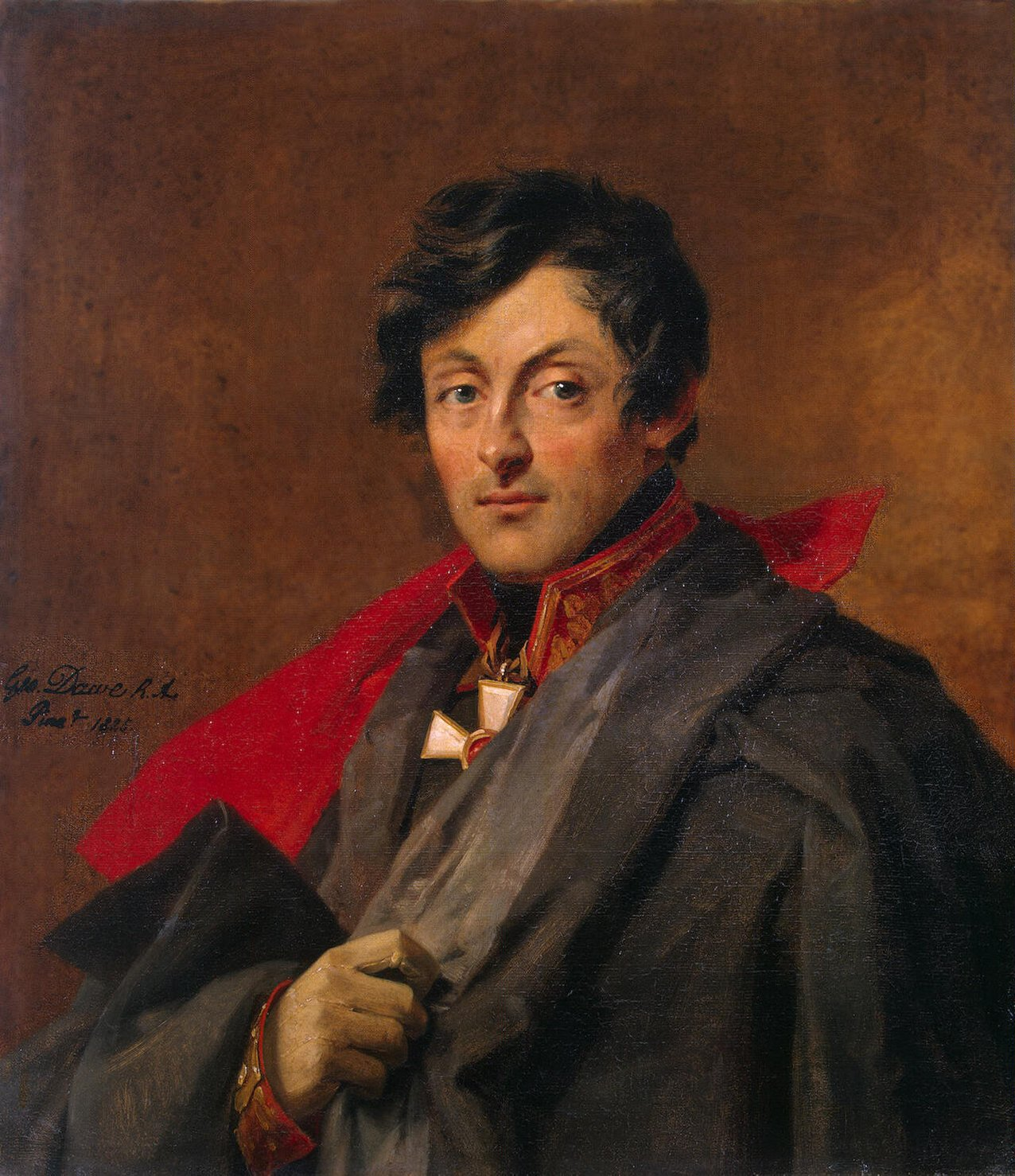
Alexander Ivanovich Ostermann-Tolstoy

== See also ==
- List of Russian commanders in the Patriotic War of 1812
