= Seldom Seen =

American dressage horse

- Breed: Connemara x Thoroughbred
- Sire: Mitipo (Thoroughbred)
- Grandsire: Michel (Thoroughbred)
- Dam: Tarsdown Tully (Connemara)
- Maternal grandsire: Georgias Mister Irish (Connemara)
- Sex: Gelding
- Foaled: 1970
- Country: United States
- Colour: Gray
- Owner: Peg Whitehurst
- Trainer: Lendon Gray

Major wins
- Grand Prix, Grand Prix Special, Grand Prix Freestyle

Seldom Seen (1970–1996) was a Connemara/Thoroughbred cross that competed at the highest levels of dressage with his rider, Lendon Gray. He was a gray.

American-bred Seldom Seen was trained and competed by the Olympic dressage rider Lendon Gray. The pony was originally intended to be a Pony Club mount for Kim, the daughter of Peg Whitehurst. He won USDF Horse of the Year awards from the Third Level through Grand Prix, as well as an individual gold medal at the U.S. Olympic Festival in Syracuse, NY. He was also AHSA Reserve Champion at 2nd level and AHSA Champion at 3rd, 4th, Prix St. Georges, and Intermediaire 1.

Seldom Seen was retired in 1987, after winning the Grand Prix, Grand Prix Special, and Grand Prix Freestyle at Dressage at Devon. He died in 1996, at the age of 26.

Although only 14.2 hands (58 inches, 147 cm), small for a Grand Prix dressage horse and described as an average mover, Seldom Seen was very successful and was particularly loved by the public because he was an "average" horse that performed spectacularly. He was inducted into the USDF Hall of Fame in 2005.

== See also ==
- List of historical horses
