= Riding instructor =

Person whose job it is to teach methods of horse riding

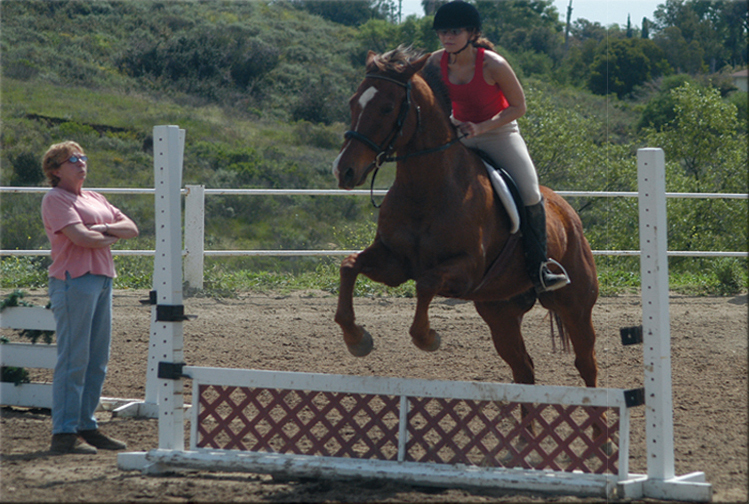
An instructor gives a lesson to a rider over jumps.

A riding instructor is a person whose job it is to teach methods of horse riding (and also horse care) to beginners and improve the intermediate and advanced rider's style and technique. A riding instructor may also serve as a coach for a rider in competition. Some instructors may work out of their own riding facility, others at a riding school or training center. With appropriate academic credentials, some may teach in a college or university equestrian studies program. Yet others freelance and travel from stable to stable.

== Accreditation ==
In much of the world, there are no formal requirements or licensing for riding instructors. However, in Great Britain and in most of Europe, there are recognised bodies who are accredited bodies for awarding qualifications. The International Group for Equestrian Qualifications provides membership for many awarding bodies and federations from around the world. Instructors from those member countries may hold an International Trainers Passports - awarded by the IGEQ - enabling them to show that equivalent instructional qualifications have been gained.

Other nations, such as Australia and South Africa have professional qualifications offered by awarding bodies or federations for their instructors: The Australian Equestrian Federation and the South African Equestrian Federation. In Great Britain, the British Horse Society (BHS), and the Association of British Riding Schools (ABRS) certify instructors or riders can gain a UK Coaching Certificate which recognises instructors who specialise in competing. In Great Britain it is difficult to gain any sort of professional insurance as a freelance instructor without gaining those professional qualifications. While undergoing training to become an instructor they are trained in schooling and improvement of the horse. These instructors may belong to the BHS Register of Instructors and will therefore be recognised as maintaining their training standards by undertaking regular training courses and updating their training record.

== USA system ==
In the United States, there are no official criteria or licensing required for an individual to become a riding instructor. However, private organizations such as the American Riding Instructors Association (ARIA) offer testing and certification that may help a riding instructor gain credibility in the equestrian community and often helps reduce liability insurance costs. Groups such as North American Riding for the Handicapped Association also provide specialized training that allows instructors who teach therapeutic horseback riding to obtain reimbursement from health insurance and other programs. Some competitive organizations such as the United States Dressage Federation also have instructor training and certification programs.

== The BHS Assessment System ==
The qualifications gained from the BHS are gained in stages. They are listed in order, and the minimum required age of the candidate is given.

1. Ride Safe (Previously known as Riding and Road Safety) (MUST be taken before the Stage 2 Ride assessment) Min. age 11 years.
2. Stage 1 Horse Care + Ride (may be taken separately or together). Min. age 14 years.
3. Stage 2 Horse Care + Ride + Lunge (may be taken separately or together) Min age 16 years.
4. Stage 2 Teach (Previously known as Preliminary Teaching Test or PTT) Min. age 17 years.
5. Stage 3 Horse Care + Riding + Lunge (may be taken separately or together) Min. age 17 years.
6. Stage 3 Teach (Previously a portfolio of teaching evidence was submitted instead) Min. age 18 years.
7. First Aid at Work Certificate and an Advanced Safeguarding Certificate
8. Upon completion of all above assessments the Stage 3 Coach in Complete Horsemanship (Previously known as BHSAI or British Horse Society Assistant Instructor) qualification is awarded.

The next qualifications available (in order of achievement) are:

- Stage 4 Senior Coach (Previously known as BHSII or BHS Intermediate Instructor)
- Stage 5 Performance Coach (Previously known as BHSI or BHS Instructor)
- FBHS - Fellow of the British Horse Society. Very few people achieve this qualification. A FBHS is regarded as an international expert.

Most candidates will have to start from Stage 1 as it is a requirement to have passed the previous assessment before moving onto the next stage. However Direct Entry can be offered if a candidate has previous equine qualifications or substantial industry experience. Candidates must also be Gold Members of the BHS to take exams.

== See also ==
- Horse riding
- British Horse Society
