= Mary Aiken Littauer =

American hippologist

Mary Aiken Littauer, née Graver (February 11, 1912 – December 7, 2005), was a leading authority on ancient domesticated horses and related materials (Brownrigg 2006). Using her knowledge of contemporary horsemanship, she wrote works on ridden horses and chariots in Greece, the Near East and Egypt.

She was born Mary Aiken Graver in Pittsburgh and raised in New York. She was married to Captain Vladimir S. Littauer, an equestrian whose training and teaching methods are still in use today.

Her family chose the International Museum of the Horse at the Kentucky Horse Park as the recipient of her vast library and her own works on ancient horses.

The museum - a Smithsonian affiliate - has hired an archivist to create an inventory of the hundreds of books.

== Selected bibliography ==
- 1979 Wheeled Vehicles and Ridden Animals in the Ancient Near East, with Joost Crouwel.
- 1985 Chariots and Related Equipment from the Tomb of Tutankhamen, with Joost Crouwel.
