= Vladimir Littauer =

Equestrian and author

Littauer at a riding clinic he conducted at Sweet Briar College in February 1953.

Vladimir Stanislavovitch Littauer (January 10, 1892 – August 31, 1989) was an influential Russian and American horseback riding master and the author of books and films on educated riding and the training of horses. As a riding instructor, Littauer was in great demand during his lifetime by professionals and amateurs. He was considered an early, important and controversial advocate of the forward seat riding system during his career. He wrote more than a dozen books between 1930 and 1973 which sparked vivid debates among experienced riders of various backgrounds. He also wrote many articles on forward riding (sometimes referred to as "hunt seat") for the notable equestrian magazines of his day. His methods continue to be taught at Sweet Briar College and other riding programs.

== Early life ==
Littauer was born in the Ural Mountains of Russia but grew up in St. Petersburg. In the fall of 1911, at age 19, he entered the two year officer training program at the Nicholas Cavalry College in St. Petersburg. During his time in the school, Littauer's equestrian training was based on the French style of dressage as taught by James Fillis.

During the Summer Olympics of 1912, Littauer took notice of Russian cavalry officers who had spent time in Pinerolo, Italy learning methods pioneered by Federico Caprilli. The officers distinguished themselves and excited much interest in Caprilli's new system of "forward riding," which, at the time, represented a repudiation of traditional manège-style dressage techniques. Around 1913 senior coronet Vladimir Sokolov introduced Littauer to Caprilli's revolutionary method of riding.

== Early career ==
Son of a St. Petersburgh industrialist, Vladimir Littauer attended the Nicholas Cavalry College as a junker (officer cadet) for two years, starting in 1911. On graduation he was commissioned, on August 6, 1913, as a cornet (equivalent to second lieutenant) in the 1st Sumsky Hussars. This was the senior line regiment of the Russian Imperial Cavalry, dating from 1651, and in his autobiography "Russian Hussar" Littauer describes in detail a lifestyle that was about to end. After a year of peacetime garrison duties in Moscow, Littauer and his regiment were mobilized for active service against Germany with the outbreak of World War I. He continued to serve as a mounted cavalryman on the Eastern Front until the October Revolution of 1917, reaching the rank of Rotmistr, (equivalent to Captain). After leaving his disintegrating regiment Littauer joined the anti-Bolshevik White Army. During the Russian Civil War he fought in Ukraine and Siberia, finally escaping to Canada with his family in the early spring of 1920. Littauer's war-time experiences demonstrated to him the impracticality and limitations of dressage for field riding and combat. He was later inspired to write, "The method of riding in the Russian cavalry was of the manège type, which today is usually called Dressage . . . This artificial system worked well on the parade ground, but not across country, and the experiences of war disappointed even its most ardent supporters."

After coming to the United States in 1921, Littauer took factory and sales jobs in New York City to help him learn to speak English. In 1927 he happened to meet two fellow former Russian cavalry officers in New York: Sergei Kournakoff and Kadir A. Guirey. Together the three founded the Boots and Saddles Riding School, teaching principles of dressage they had learned in cavalry school, but soon they began experimenting with the radical and progressive Caprilli methods. The forward riding precepts of Caprilli proved more practical and accessible than traditional manège-influenced dressage for their civilian riding students who had limited time for riding and varying levels of fitness. Despite the Great Depression, the Boots and Saddles School thrived, adding a new ring and stables in New York City.

== Writing career ==
Littauer began writing, publishing Jumping the Horse in 1931 and The Defense of the Forward Seat with his co-founder, Kournakoff, in 1934. In 1937 Littauer left Boots and Saddles to begin working with students on their own horses and to offer riding clinics at schools, colleges and hunt clubs. By this time he was recognized "as one of the most influential teachers, lecturers and equestrian authors in the country."

Littauer continued to teach and write for the next thirty years. He was a frequent guest lecturer at Sweet Briar College in Virginia where one of his students, Harriet Rogers, founded a riding program for the college. Over the years Littauer conducted original research which, through his writing, resulted in major contributions to the sport of riding. In a 1972 speech, Rogers referred to Littauer as "the outstanding proponent of Forward Riding in this country." Former Director of the Sweet Briar College Riding Program and author Paul Cronin called Littauer "the most influential author and instructor in America in this century." George Morris cites Littauer in his list of "the greatest American authors" on riding.

== Legacy ==
A few of Littauer's significant contributions to modern riding include his accurate analysis of the gaits and mechanics of the jump; his recognition and advocacy of controls as a component of a forward seat riding system; his development of three levels of control for teaching riders and for schooling horses; his advocacy of the voice as an aid in schooling and in riding; his definition of the concept of stabilization; and his philosophy that encourages riders to feel empathy for their horses. His teachings continue to be advocated and supported by the American National Riding Commission and taught by schools affiliated with the ANRC.

Although Littauer retired from teaching in the late 1970s, he continued to write until the early 1980s. He died at his home on Long Island on August 31, 1989 at the age of 97. His personal library, including his instructional film and manuscript collection, resides at the National Sporting Library in Middleburg, Virginia.

Vladimir Littauer was married to Mary Aiken Graver Littauer in 1935 in New York City. They had one son, Andrew A. Littauer of Princeton, New Jersey.

== Bibliography ==
- Boots and Saddles, Ten Talks on Horsemanship (1930) With Sergei N. Kournakoff
- Jumping the Horse (1931)
- The Defense of the Forward Seat (1934) With Sergei N. Kournakoff
- Forward Riding (1934)
- Modern Horsemanship for Beginners (1934)
- Riding Forward (1935)
- More About Riding Forward (1938)
- Be a Better Horseman (1941)
- More About the Forward Seat (1945)
- Commonsense Horsemanship (1951)
- Schooling Your Horse (1956)
- Do Collected Gaits have Place in Schooling Hunters and Jumpers? (1957)
- Horseman's Progress (1962)
- Russian Hussar (1966)
- How a Horse Jumps (1972)
- The Rigid Back (1980)
- A Complete Guide to Horsemanship (1982)

== See also ==
- Paul D. Cronin—student of Littauer
- Joe Fargis—Olympic Gold Medalist student of one of Littauer's students
- Kathy Kusner
