= United States Dressage Federation =

An equestrian dressage federation

- Abbreviation: USDF
- Founded: 1973; Lincoln, Nebraska
- Headquarters: Kentucky Horse Park; Lexington, KY
- President: Kevin Reinig
- Vice President: Debra Reinhart

The United States Dressage Federation, or the USDF, is the national membership federation for the equestrian sport of dressage. As a recognized international discipline association of the USEF, the Federation is committed to education, recognition of achievement and promotion of dressage in the United States.

The USDF was founded in 1973 by Lowell Boomer in Lincoln, Nebraska. He served as its first CEO for its first sixteen years. It offers year-end awards for every level of competition, as well as different breeds, junior and young riders, and adult amateur riders. It also puts on the US Dressage Finals annually, which includes classes from training level through the Grand Prix for all age level.

The USDF also has an instructor certification program, and offers many clinics for riders of all levels.

The Executive Board has four officers, nine regional directors, and three at-large directors. As of 2023, the president is George Williams.
