= Tarutino =

Tarutino may refer to the following places:

- Tarutino, Russia
  - Battle of Tarutino in the 1812 French invasion of Russia
- Tarutyne, now Bessarabske, Ukraine
