= French occupation of Moscow =

1812 occupation during the French invasion of Russia

- Part of the French invasion of Russia
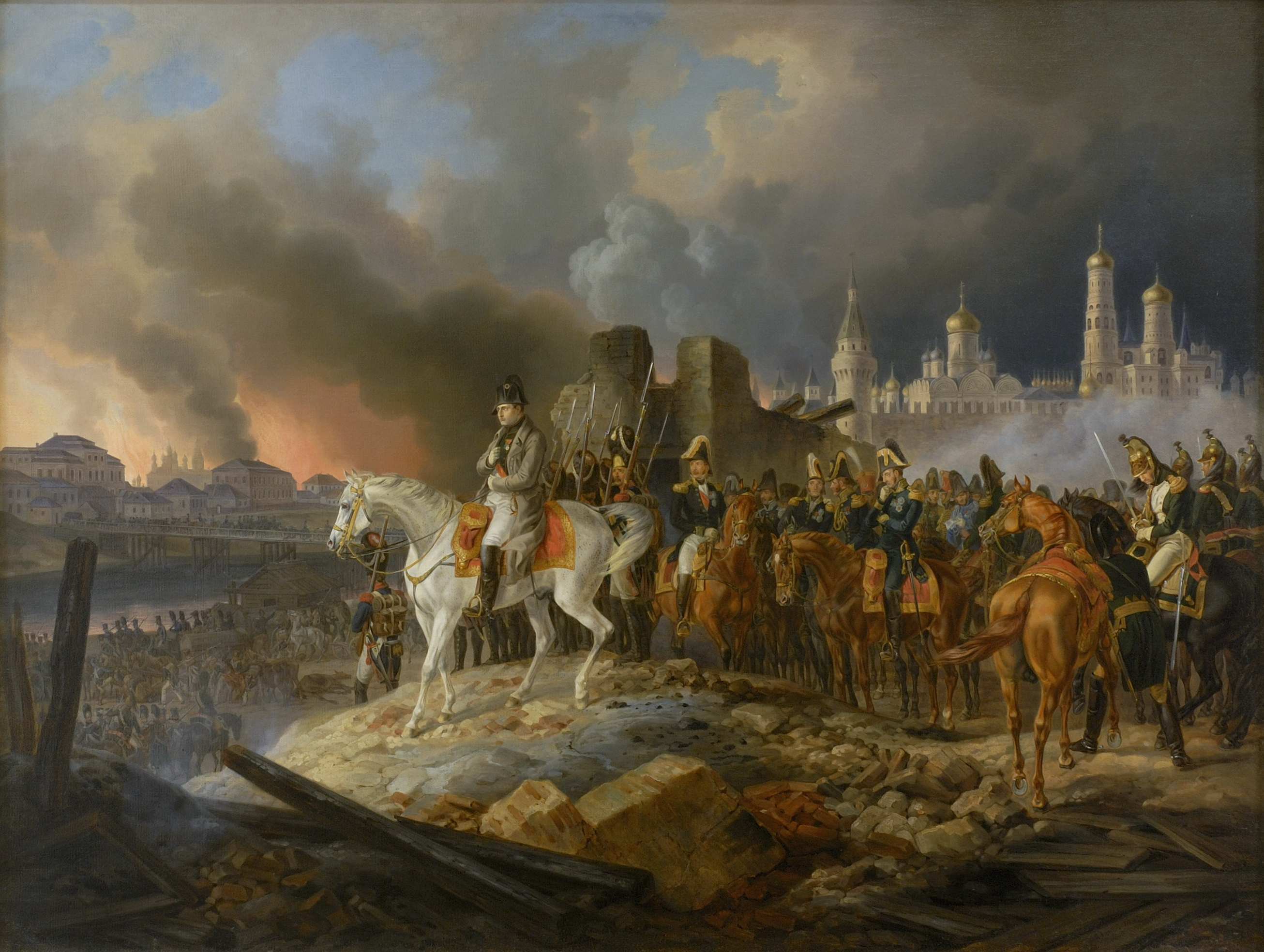
- Napoleon in burning Moscow by Albrecht Adam, 1841
Date	14 September – 19 October 1812
Location	Moscow, Russia 55.75°N 37.63°E
Result	See § Aftermath
Territorial changes	Napoleon's retreat from Moscow, starting from October 19.

Belligerents
France	Russia

Commanders and leaders
(First French Empire) Napoleon	(Russian Empire) Fyodor Rostopchin

Strength
100,000	Unknown part of about 250,000 inhabitants
- Location within Europe

French invasion of Russia
current battle
Prussian corps
Napoleon
Austrian corps

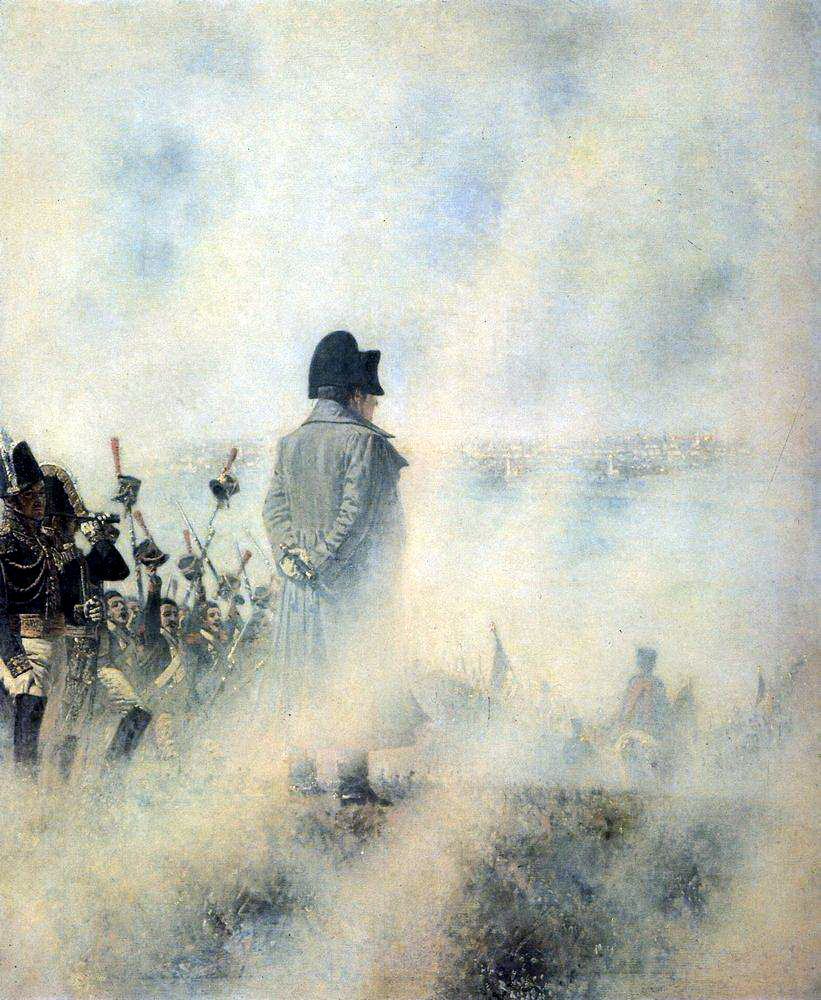
Before Moscow waiting for the Boyars' Deputation, by Vasily Vereshchagin

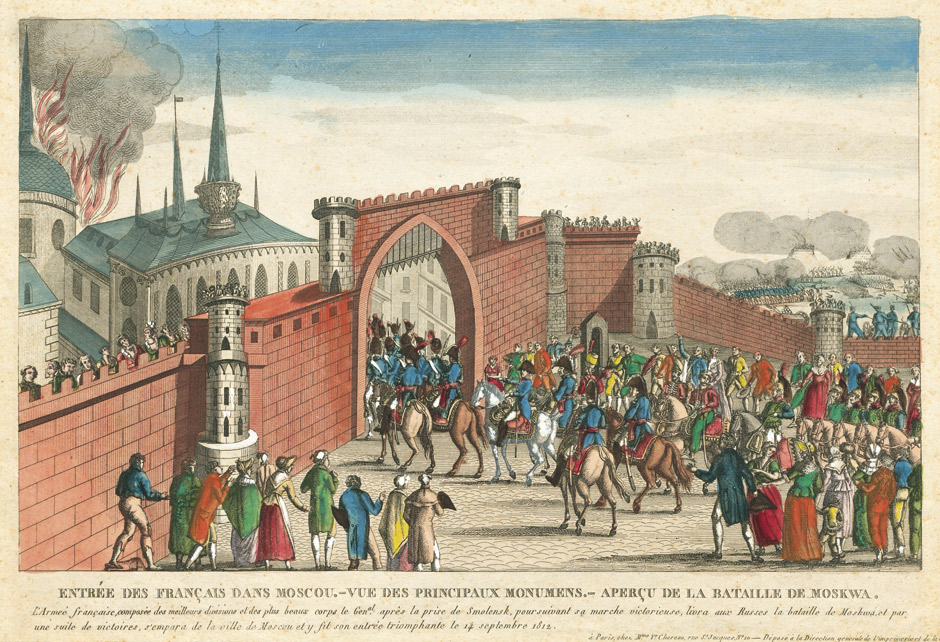
The entry of the French into Moscow

French emperor Napoleon Bonaparte's Grande Armée occupied Moscow from 14 September to 19 October 1812 during the Napoleonic Wars. It marked the summit of the French invasion of Russia. During the occupation, which lasted 36 days, the city was devastated by fire and looted by both Russian peasants and the French.

Napoleon's invasion of Russia began on the 24th of June in 1812, and he had made considerable progress by autumn. With French victory in the Battle of Borodino on 7 September, the way to Moscow was open. The opposing Russian army under Mikhail Kutuzov had suffered heavy losses and chose to retreat. A week of close escapes on the part of the Russian army followed. Napoleon and Kutuzov even slept on the same bed in the manor of Bolshiye Vyazyomy just one night apart, as the French chased the Russians down. Napoleon and his army entered Moscow on 14 September. To Napoleon's surprise, Kutuzov had abandoned the city, and it fell without a fight. Hundreds of thousands of civilians fled along with the retreating Russian army, leaving the city nearly empty.

The capture of the city was a hollow victory for the French, as the Russians—most likely on orders of governor Fyodor Rostopchin—set much of the city on fire in a scorched earth tactic (though the cause of the fire is disputed). For four days until 18 September, the city burned. The French, who had intended to pilfer the city for supplies, were now deep in enemy territory without adequate food as winter was approaching. The French thoroughly looted what had not burned, including ransacking churches. French misery was compounded by guerilla warfare by the Cossacks against French supplies, and total war by peasants. This kind of attrition war weakened the French army at its most vulnerable point: logistics.

On 19 October, after losing the Battle of Tarutino, Napoleon and his Grande Armée, slowly weakened by the attrition warfare against him, lacking provisions, and facing the first snows, abandoned the city voluntarily and marched southwards until the Battle of Maloyaroslavets stopped the advance. The retreating French set further fires in the city, and blew up monuments. The Russians retook the city on 19 October, and quelled rioting and looting by peasants. The destruction of the city was considerable: it would take more than half a century to return to its pre-war population.

== Background ==
Field Marshal Mikhail Kutuzov's Russian army suffered heavy losses at the Battle of Borodino on 7 September 1812. Before dawn of 8 September, Kutuzov ordered a retreat from Borodino eastwards to preserve the army. They camped outside Mozhaysk. On 10 September, the main quarter of the Russian army was situated in Bolshiye Vyazyomy, in whose manor house Kutuzov stayed the night—sleeping on a sofa in the library. Russian sources suggest Kutuzov wrote a number of orders and letters to Fyodor Rostopchin about saving the city or the army. On 11 September Napoleon wrote Marshal Victor to hurry to Moscow, worried about the already enormous losses his massive army had suffered as a result of Barclay and Kutuzov's attrition warfare against Napoleon. On 12 September [O.S. 31 August] 1812 the main forces of Kutuzov departed from the village, now Golitsyno, and camped near Odintsovo, 20 km to the west. They were followed by Édouard Mortier and Joachim Murat's vanguard. On 12 September Bonaparte, who suffered from a cold and lost his voice, slept in the main manor house of Bolshiye Vyazyomy—on the same sofa in the library that Kutuzov had just the night before. On 13 September Napoleon left the manor house and headed east. Napoleon and Poniatowski also camped near Odintsovo and invited Murat for dinner. In the afternoon Russian army commanders met at the village of Fili near Moscow. After a long discussion Kutuzov followed the advice of Karl Tol to retreat to the south, leading to the Battle of Maloyaroslavets with a reinforced Russian army.

== The French enter Moscow ==
General Mikhail Miloradovich, commander of the Russian rearguard, was concerned by the disposition of the army; it was stretched across Moscow, burdened with a large number of wounded and numerous convoys. Miloradovich sent Captain Fyodor Akinfov, of the Hussar Regiment's Life Guards, to open negotiations with Marshal Joachim Murat, commander of the French vanguard. Akinfov would deliver a note signed by Colonel Paisiy Kaysarov, the duty general of the General Staff of the Russian Army, stating "the wounded left in Moscow are entrusted to the humanity of the French troops", and a verbal message from Miloradovich saying:

If the French want to occupy Moscow as a whole, they must, without advancing strongly, let us calmly leave it with artillery and a convoy; otherwise, General Miloradovich will fight to the last man before Moscow and in Moscow and, instead of Moscow, will leave the ruins.

Akinfov was also to delay by staying in the French camp for as long as possible.

On the morning of 14 September, Akinfov and a trumpeter from Miloradovich's convoy arrived at the French line just as the French were resuming their attack with cavalry. They were received by Colonel Clément Louis Elyon de Villeneuve, of the 1st Horse-Jaeger Regiment, who sent Akinfov to General Horace François Bastien Sébastiani, commander of the II Cavalry Corps. Sébastiani's offer to deliver the note was refused; Akinfov said that he was ordered to personally deliver the note and a verbal message to Murat. The Russian delegation was sent to Murat.

Initially, Murat rejected a compromise. To the note he replied that it was "in vain to entrust the sick and wounded to the generosity of the French troops; the French in captive enemies no longer see enemies". Furthermore, Murat said that only Napoleon could stop the offensive, and sent the Russians to meet the emperor. However, Murat quickly changed his mind and recalled the delegation, saying that he was willing to accept Miloradovich's terms to save Moscow by advancing "as quietly" as the Russians, on the condition that the French were allowed to take the city on the same day. Murat also asked Akinfov, a native of Moscow, to persuade the city's residents to remain calm to avoid reprisals.

Before leaving, Kutuzov had Rostopchin destroy most of Moscow's supplies as part of a scorched earth strategy; this was an action different from the famous burning of Moscow which would later destroy the city.

The Grande Armée began entering Moscow on the afternoon of 14 September, a Monday, on the heels of retreating Russian army. Cavalry from the French vanguard encountered Cossacks from the Russian rearguard; there was no fighting, and there were displays of mutual respect. At 14:00, Napoleon arrived at Poklonnaya Gora, 3 miles from the limits of 1812 Moscow. (Note: The official of the Russian Ministry of Finance, Fyodor Korbeletsky, who was captured by the French on August 30 and was at Napoleon's main headquarters for 3 weeks, left detailed notes on what was happening during this period. Notes by Korbeletsky "A Brief Narrative About the French Invasion of Moscow and Their Stay in It. With the Appendix of an Ode in Honor of the Victorious Russian Army" were published in Saint Petersburg in 1813.) Accompanying him was the French vanguard, arrayed in battle formation by Murat's orders. Napoleon waited for half an hour; when there was no Russian response he ordered a cannon fired to signal the advance on the city. The French advanced swiftly. Infantry and artillery began entering Moscow. French troops divided before the Dorogomilovskaya gate to enter the city through other gates.

Napoleon stopped at the city walls, the Kamer-Kollezhsky rampart, about 15 minutes away from the Dorogomilovskaya gate, to wait for a delegation from Moscow. Ten minutes later, a young man told the French that the city had been abandoned by the Russian army and population. The news was met by bewilderment, and then despondency and grief. It was not until an hour later that Napoleon resumed his procession into the city, followed by the first French cavalry into Moscow. He passed the Dorogomilovskaya Yamskaya Sloboda and stopped on the banks of the Moscow River. The vanguard crossed the river; infantry and artillery used the bridge, while cavalry forded. On the opposite bank, the army broke up into small guard detachments along the river bank and streets.

Napoleon continued on with his large retinue. He was preceded by two squadrons of horse guards at a distance of a hundred fathoms, and his uniform was austere compared to those around him. The streets were deserted. On Arbat Street, Napoleon saw only a pharmacist and his family attending to a wounded French general at a stand. At the Borovitsky gate of the Kremlin, Napoleon said of the walls with a sneer: "What a scary wall!".

According to contemporary accounts, Napoleon ordered food to be delivered to the Kremlin by Russians—regardless of sex, age, or infirmity—instead of by horse; this was in response to the indifference that the Russians had treated his arrival. According to historian Alexander Martin, Muscovites generally left the city rather than accept the occupation so that most of the city was empty when the French arrived and even more Muscovites would leave while the French remained there and anywhere from 6,000 to 10,000 remained in the city; (Note: According to Martin, only 6,200 civilians remained.; however, historian Vladimir Zemtsov calculates that 10 thousand inhabitants remained) in addition to them around 10,000 to 15,000 wounded and sick Russian soldiers also remained. For comparison, the city was calculated to host more than 270,000 inhabitants: a police survey from the beginning of 1812 found 270,184 residents.

The frequency of looting by the French army and the local population increased as the occupation continued. Initially, looting was driven by wealth but later it was for food. Civilians were killed by troops. Attempts by French commanders to maintain discipline failed and soldiers would openly disobey the orders of their officers; as such, many French soldiers took part in these war crimes, even those of the elite Imperial Guard joining their comrades in looting and attacking civilians. The locals sometimes called the French "pagans" or "basurmans" which depicted the French as godless, as the desecration of local churches was systematically done by the French army to fill Napoleon's war chest.

== Moscow Fire ==
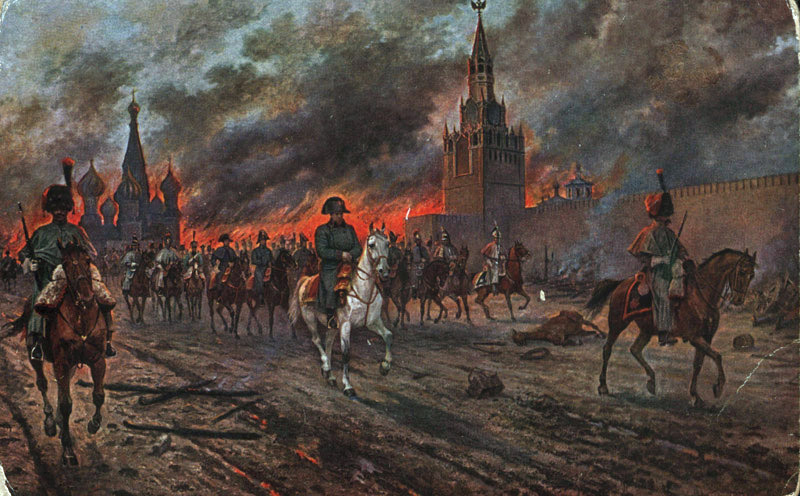
Napoleon leaving the Kremlin

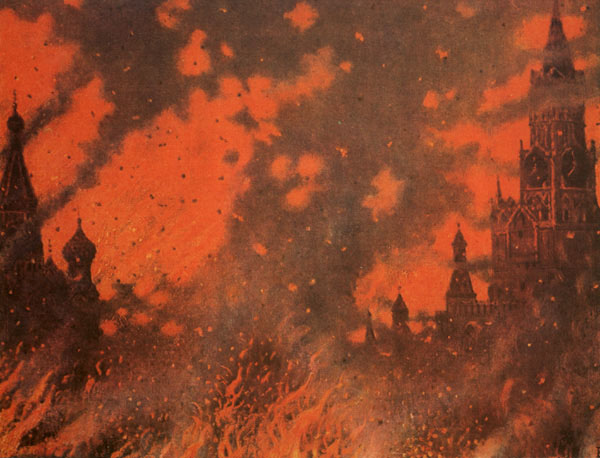
Zamoskvorechye in fire, by Vasily Vereshchagin

Arson occurred around the city when the French entered on 14 September. The French believed that Count Fyodor Rostopchin, the Moscow governor, ordered the fires, and this is the most widely accepted theory; furthermore, Rostopchin also had all the firefighting equipment removed or disabled, making it impossible to fight the flames. Strong winds, starting on the night of 15–16 September and persisting for more than a day, fanned the flames across the city. A French military court shot up to 400 citizens on suspicion of arson.

The fire worsened Napoleon's mood, though he was deeply impressed and disturbed by the Russian scorched earth policies and expressed shock and fear at them. One eyewitness recalled that the Emperor said the following about the fire: "What a terrible sight! And they did this themselves! So many palaces! What an incredible solution! What kind of people! These are Scythians!".

Eventually, the intensity of the fire forced Napoleon to escape the Kremlin and relocate to the Petrovsky Palace early in the morning of 16 September as the fire surrounded him and his entourage. Count Ségur described this incident as follows:

We were surrounded by a sea of flame; it threatened all the gates leading from the Kremlin. The first attempts to get out of it were unsuccessful. Finally, an exit to the Moscow River was found under the mountain. Napoleon came out through him from the Kremlin with his retinue and the old guard. Coming closer to the fire, we did not dare to enter these waves of the sea of fire. Those who managed to get to know the city a little did not recognize the streets disappearing in smoke and ruins. However, it was necessary to decide on something, because with every moment the fire intensified more and more around us. A strong heat burned our eyes, but we could not close them and had to stare forward. The suffocating air, the hot ashes and the flame of the spiral escaping from everywhere, our breath, short, dry, constrained and suppressed by smoke. We burned our hands, trying to protect our face from the terrible heat, and cast off the sparks that showered and burned the dress.

Historian Yevgeny Tarle writes that Napoleon and his entourage travelled along the burning Arbat and then the relatively safe shores of the Moscow River.

The fire (Note: There are several versions of the fire—organized arson when leaving the city (usually associated with the name of Fyodor Rostopchin), arson by Russian scouts (several Russians were shot by the French on such a charge), uncontrolled actions by the invaders, a random fire that spread due to the general chaos in the abandoned city. There were several pockets of fire, so it is possible that all versions are true to one degree or another.) raged until 18 September and destroyed most of Moscow; the flames were reportedly visible over 215 km, or 133 miles, away. Louise Fusil, a French actress, who was living in Russia for six years, witnessed the fire and offers details in her memoires.

== Napoleon in Moscow ==
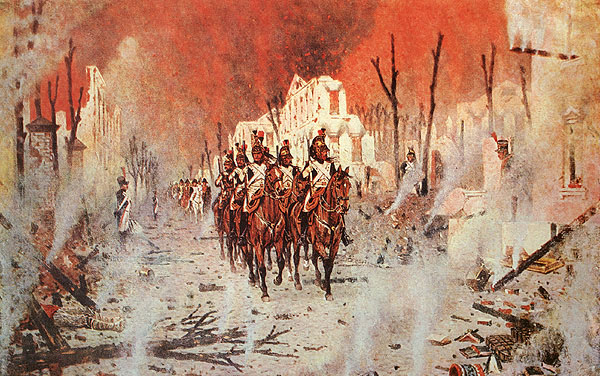
Napoleon's return to the Kremlin from Petrovsky Palace

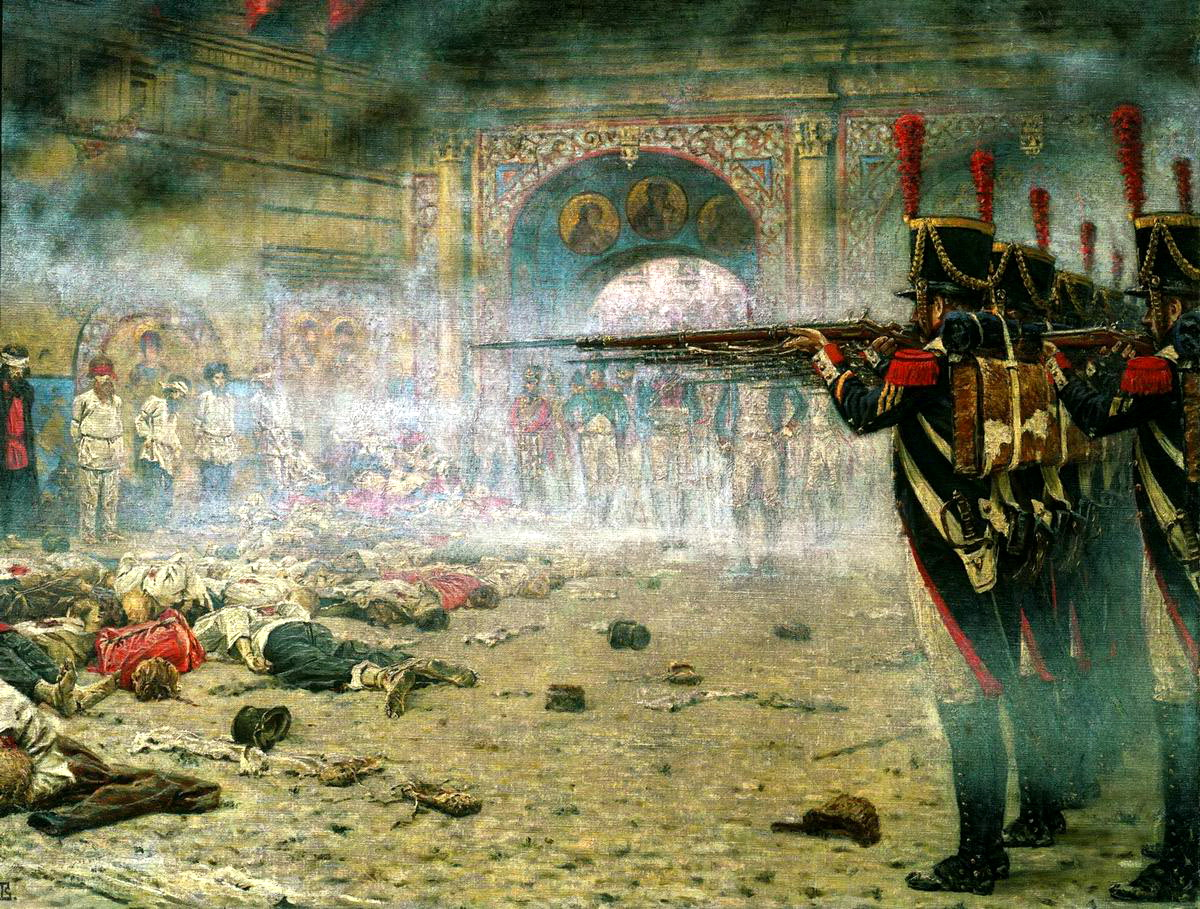
Execution of Moscow arsonists by French troops

Napoleon returned to the Kremlin on 18 September where he announced his intention to remain in Moscow for the winter; he believed the city still offered better facilities and provisions. He ordered defensive preparations, including the fortification of the Kremlin and the monasteries surrounding the city, and reconnaissance beyond the city. Napoleon continued to address the empire's state affairs while in Moscow.

A municipal governing body, the Moscow municipality, was created and met at the house of Chancellor Nikolai Rumyantsev on Maroseyka 17. Dulong, a merchant, was selected to lead the body; he was instructed by Quartermaster Lesseps to choose philistines and merchants to help him. The 25 members of the municipality searched for food near the city, helped the poor, and saved burning churches. Because they had been conscripted, the members were not punished for collaboration after the occupation. The French created a municipal police force on 12 October.

Napoleon toured the city and nearby monasteries in near-daily sojourns. He allowed General Tutolmin, the head of the Moscow Orphanage, to write to patron Empress Maria about the conditions of the pupils; he also asked Tutolmin to communicate his desire for peace to Emperor Alexander I. Tutolmin's messenger to Saint Petersburg was allowed through French lines on 18 September. Napoleon sent two other peace proposals. Ivan Yakovlev was a wealthy landowner who remained to care for his young son Alexander Herzen and the mother; he was permitted to leave for Saint Petersburg with a letter from the French to Alexander I. The last attempt was on 4 October, when General Jacques Lauriston, the pre-war ambassador to Russia, was sent to speak with Kutuzov at Tarutino; Kutuzov refused to negotiate but promised to relay proposals from Alexander I. Napoleon received no replies to any of the proposals.

Some Soviet historians (for example, Tarle) believed that Napoleon considered abolishing serfdom to pressure Alexander I and the Russian nobility. (Note: The rationale is that Napoleon intended to look for information about Pugachev in the Moscow archive, asked to sketch the manifesto for the peasantry, wrote to Eugène de Beauharnais, that it would be nice to cause an uprising of peasants.) The occupation caused some social unrest; there were cases of serfs declaring themselves freed from their obligations to their landlords—especially those about to flee.

== Treatment of churches ==
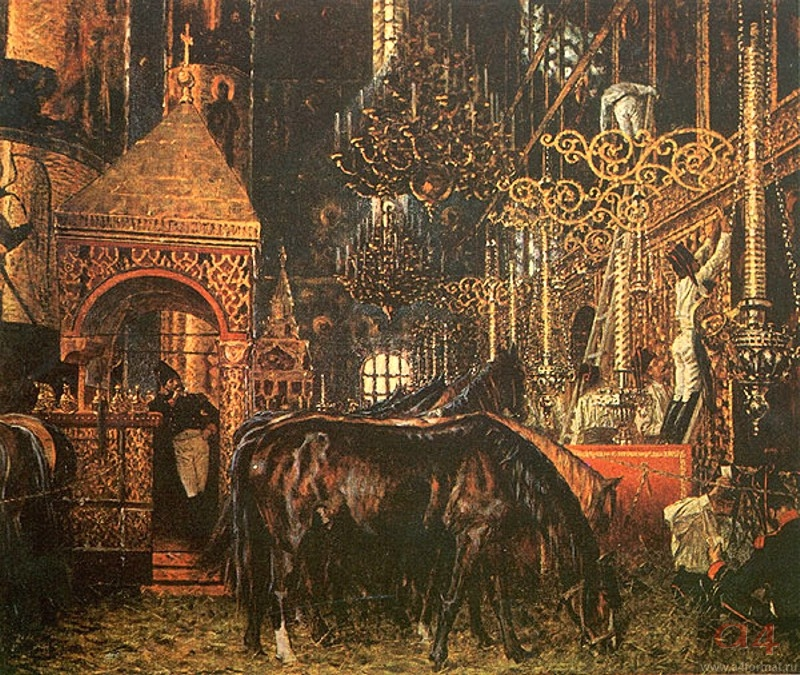
Stable in the Assumption Cathedral

Churches were not afforded special protections. Some housed stables, wood components were used as fuel, and others had their gold and silver items melted down. After the occupation, the Assumption Cathedral of the Moscow Kremlin was closed to the public to hide the damage:

I was overwhelmed with horror, finding this revered temple, which spared even the flame, now put upside down the godlessness of the unbridled soldier, and made sure that the state in which it was needed to be hidden from the eyes of the people. The relics of the saints were disfigured, their tombs filled with sewage; decorations from tombs are torn off. The images adorning the church were stained and split.

According to another account, rumors exaggerated the damage to churches as "most of the cathedrals, monasteries and churches were turned into guard barracks" and "no one was allowed to enter the Kremlin under Napoleon". (Note: Of course, the guards did not keep order in the temples. According to Shakhovsky's recollections, "wine flowing out of broken barrels was dirty in the Archangel's Cathedral, junk was thrown out of the palaces and the Armory, among other things, two naked stuffed animals representing old armor".) The Russians hid some items before abandoning the city; Alexander Shakhovskoy writes: "In the Miracle Monastery there was no shrine of Saint Alexei, it was taken out and hidden by Russian piety, as well as the relics of Saint Tsarevich Demetrius, and I found only one cotton paper in the tomb".

According to Shakhovskoy, the only case of desecration deliberately meant to insult was a dead horse being left in place of the throne on the altar of the Kazan Cathedral.

== The French abandon Moscow ==
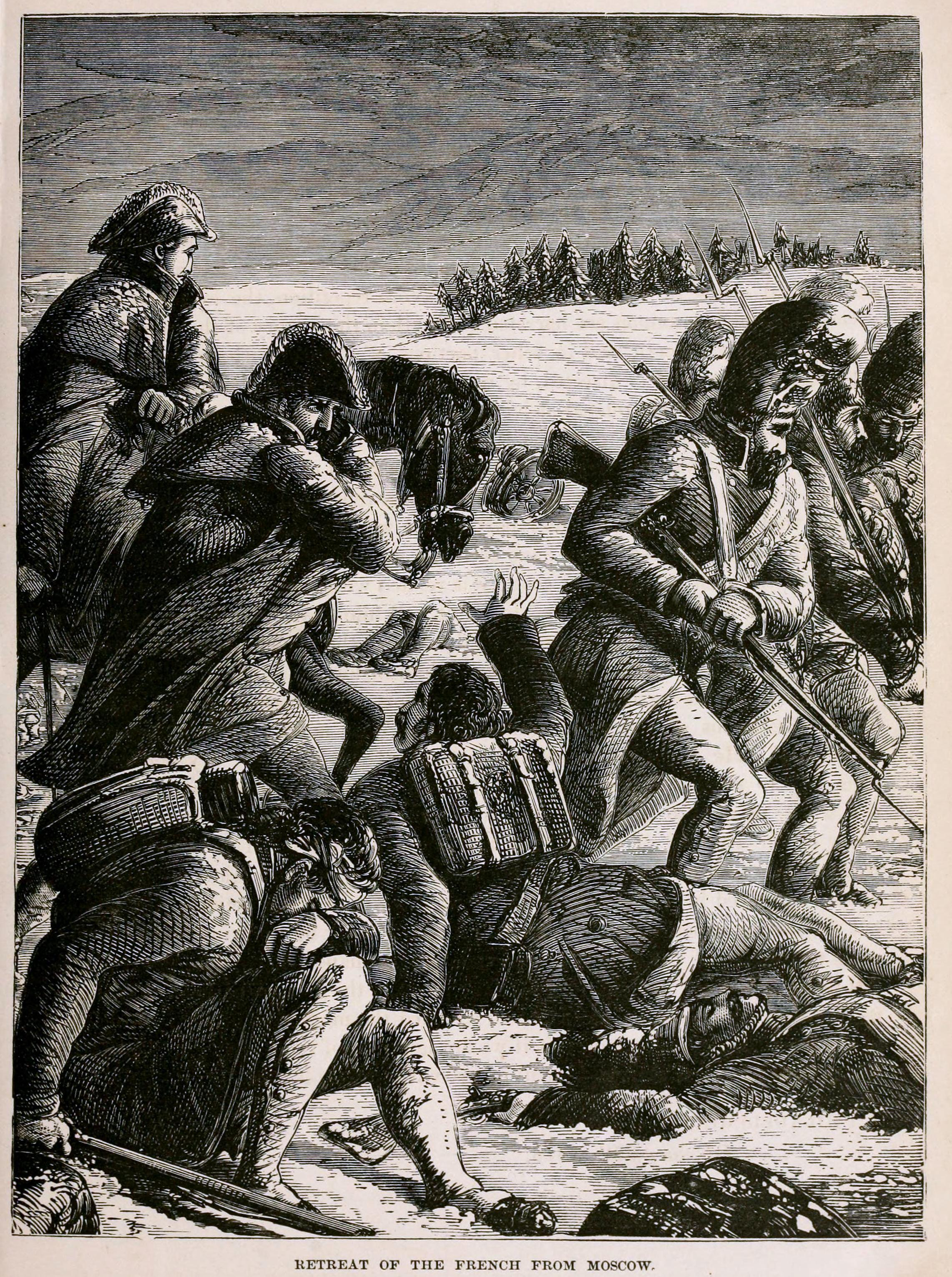
Retreat of the French from Moscow

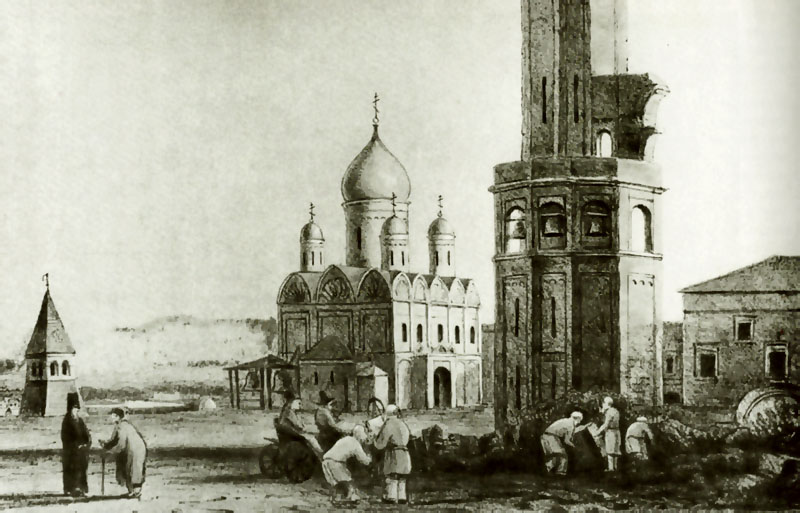
When the Ivan the Great Bell Tower was blown up, all the later outbuildings fell off.

It was impossible to adequately provision the Grande Armée in a burnt city, with guerrilla warfare by the Cossacks against French supplies and a total war by the peasants against foraging. This warfare weakened the French army at its most vulnerable point, logistics, as it had overstretched its supply lines. "An army marches on its stomach" says Riehn. The campaigning to Saint Petersburg, Russia's official capital, was out of the question as winter was closing in. The main French army's combat effectiveness had been further reduced by indiscipline and idleness. On 18 October, General Bennigsen's Russian force defeated Murat's French force at the Chernishna River in, the Battle of Tarutino. The same day, the Second Battle of Polotsk saw another French defeat. Napoleon finally recognized that there would be no peace agreement.

On 19 October, the main French army began moving along the Old Kaluga Road. Only Marshal Édouard Mortier's corps remained in Moscow; Mortier was the city's Governor General. Napoleon intended to attack and defeat the Russian army, and then break out into unforaged country for provisions; however, short on supplies and seeing the fall of the first snows on Moscow, the French abandoned the city voluntarily that same night. Also that night, he made camp in the village of Troitsky on the Desna River and ordered Mortier to destroy Moscow and then rejoin the main army.

Mortier was to set fire to wine shops, barracks, and public buildings, followed by the city in general, and then the Kremlin. Gunpowder was to be placed under the Kremlin walls, which would explode after the French left the city. There was only time to partially destroy the Kremlin. The Vodovzvodnaya Tower was completely destroyed, while the Nikolskaya, 1st Bezymyannaya and Petrovskaya Towers, the Kremlin wall, and part of the arsenal were badly damaged. The explosion set the Palace of Facets on fire. The Ivan the Great Bell Tower, the city's tallest structure, survived demolition nearly unharmed, although the nearby Church of the Resurrection was destroyed.

== Aftermath ==
The advance of the French army towards the untouched Kaluga Governorate south-westwards led subsequently to the Battle of Maloyaroslavets.

=== The Russians reoccupy Moscow ===
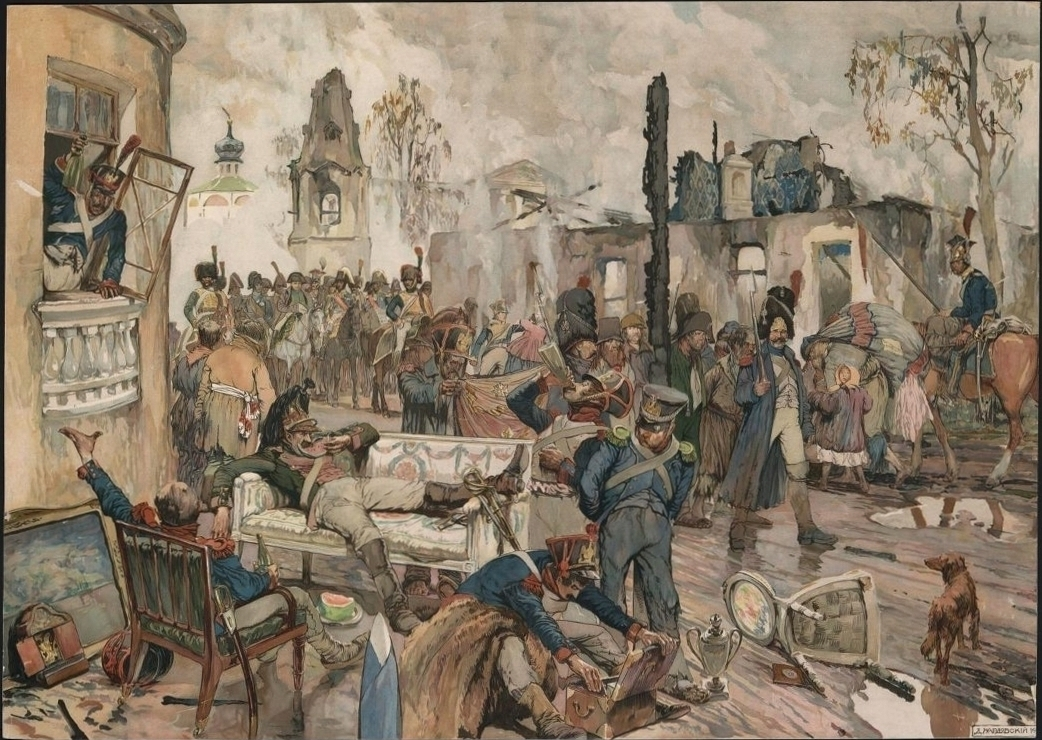
Looting of Moscow left by residents

The Russian army's cavalry vanguard, commanded by General Ferdinand von Wintzingerode, was the first to re-enter the city. Wintzingerode was captured by Mortier's troops, and command fell to General Alexander von Benckendorff. On 26 October, Benckendorf wrote to General Mikhail Vorontsov:

We entered Moscow on the evening of the 11th. (Note: This is by the Julian calendar.) The city was given for plunder to peasants, who flocked a great many, and all drunk; Cossacks and their foremen completed the rout. Entering the city with hussars and life-Cossacks, I considered it a duty to immediately take command over the police units of the unfortunate capital: people killed each other on the streets, set fire to houses. Finally, everything calmed down and the fire was extinguished. I had to endure several real battles.

Other accounts also reported crowds of peasants engaged in drunkenness, robbery and vandalism. According to Shakhovskoy:

The peasants near Moscow, of course, are the most idle and quick-witted, but the most depraved and greedy in all of Russia, assured of the enemy's exit from Moscow and relying on the turmoil of our entry, arrived on carts to capture the unlawed, but Count Benckendorf calculated differently and ordered to be loaded onto their carts and carrion and taken out of town to places convenient for burial or extermination, which saved Moscow from the infection, its inhabitants from peasant robbery, and peasants from sin.

In a report to Rostopchin dated 16 October from Ivashkin, the chief of the Moscow police, estimated that 11,959 human and 12,546 horse corpses were removed from the streets. Upon returning to the city, Rostopchin announced that looters could keep their goods but that victims should be compensated. According to Vladimir Gilyarovsky, the next Sunday market near the Sukharev Tower was filled with looted goods. The imperial manifesto of 30 August 1814 granted amnesty for most crimes committed during the invasion.

The city for its part would need at least half a century for it to be fully rebuilt and repopulated back to its pre-war levels.

== See also ==
- List of battles of the French invasion of Russia

== Citations ==
Preceded by Battle of Borodino	Napoleonic Wars; French occupation of Moscow	Succeeded by Siege of Burgos
