= Karl Gustav von Baggovut =

Russian general (1761–1812)

Karl Gustav von Baggehufwudt
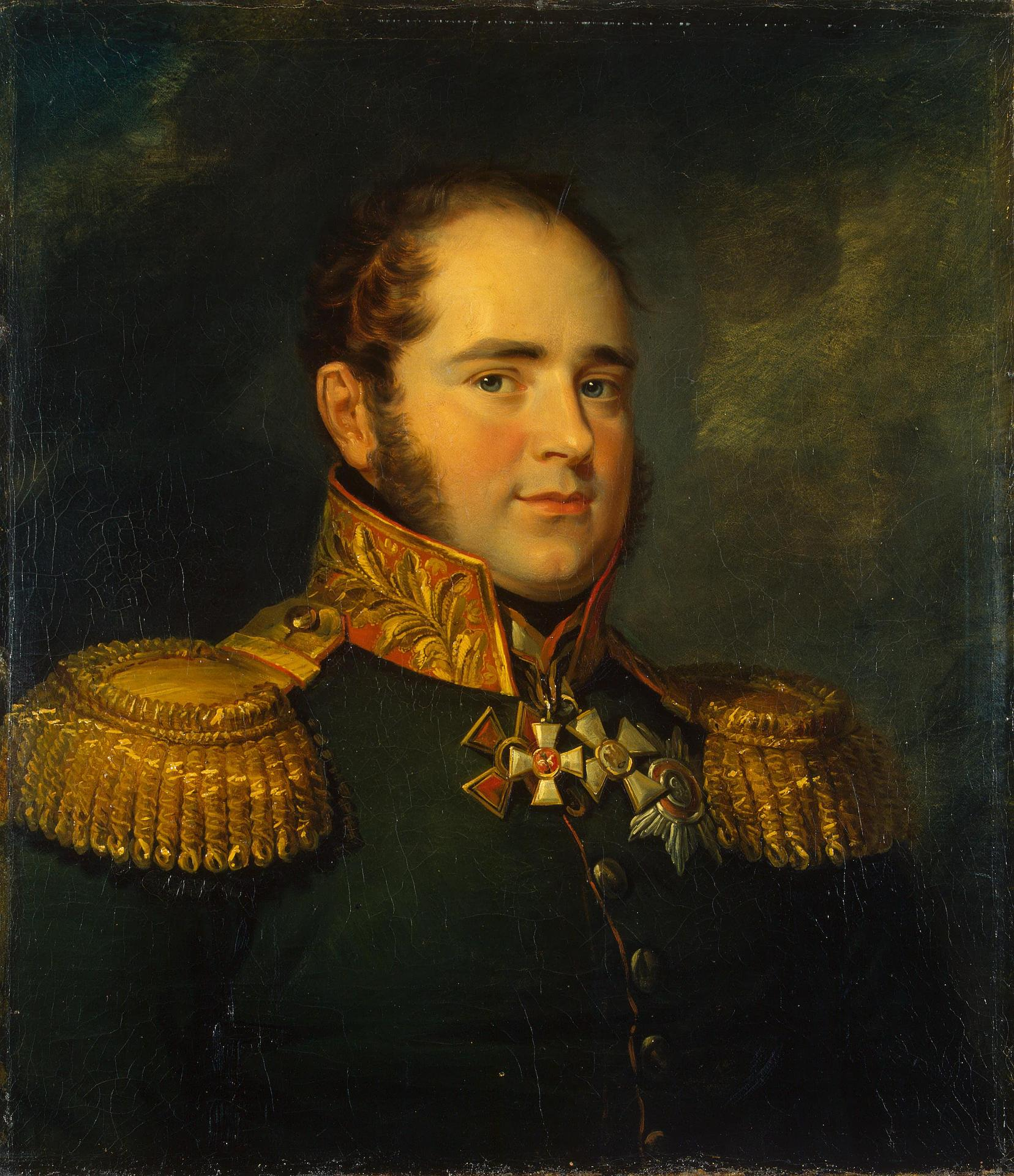
- Posthumous portrait by George Dawe, 1823–1825
- Born: 27 September 1761; Perila, Governorate of Estonia, Russian Empire
- Died: 18 October [O.S. 06 October] 1812; Tarutino, Russian Empire
- Burial place: Lavrentyev Monastery, Kaluga, Russia
- Military career
- Allegiance: Russia
- Branch: Imperial Russian Army
- Service years: 1779–1812
- Rank: Lieutenant general
- Commands: Commander (Командир) 14. Egersky Regiment; 28 (J:17) May 1797 – 28 (J:17) January 1799; Chief (Шеф) 14. (13.) Egersky Regiment 28 (J:17) January 1799 – 08 (J:27Jul) August 1800; Chief (Шеф) 4. Egersky Regiment; 17 (J:05) November 1801 – 18 (J:06) October 1812
- Conflicts: Russo-Turkish War (1787–1792); Polish–Russian War of 1792; Battle of Maciejowice; Battle of Praga; War of the Fourth Coalition; Battle of Pułtusk; Battle of Eylau; Battle of Heilsberg; Battle of Friedland; Finnish War; Battle of Lemo; Helsinki village landing (Taivassalo); Patriotic War of 1812; Battle of Borodino; Battle of Tarutino †
- Awards: Order of St. George, 3rd and 4th classes Golden Sword for Bravery; Golden Cross for the Battle of Praga; Order of Saint Vladimir, 2nd and 3rd classes Order of St. Alexander Nevsky; Order of Saint Anna, 1st class Order of the Red Eagle

Karl Gustav von Baggehufwudt (Russian: Карл Фёдорович Баггову́т, romanized: Karl Fyodorovich Baggovut; Swedish: Carl Gustaf Baggehufvudt; 27 September [O.S. 16 September] 1761 – 18 October [O.S. 06 October] 1812) was a Russian lieutenant general who took part both in the Napoleonic Wars and the Finnish War. His family was originally Norwegian, but had moved to Sweden in the 16th century, then to Estonia in the 17th century.

He was seen as one of the bravest Russian generals and, on his death at the Battle of Tarutino (or Winkowo), Alexander I of Russia wrote to his widow, "I have lost a brave commander, useful to the fatherland".

== Family ==
Baggehufwudt was married to Margarethe Elisabeth von Fock.

Baggehufwudt had six brothers and four sister, four most notable were:

- Eduard Woldemar Ferdinand: Counselor of State
- Johann Moritz: Colonel in the army of Imperial Russia
- Friedrich Wilhelm: Counselor to the Court
- Anna Charlotta Juliana: (1760–1839), Director of the Society of Education of young noblewomen, wife of Gustav-Friedrich Adlerberg (1738–1794)

== Life ==
=== Early life ===
In 1779, Baggehufwudt's father purchased to Karl Gustav a patent for the rank of the captain of the troops of the margrave of Ansbach-Bayreuth. The young Baggehufwudt began his military career in the Russian army later at the same year. At the rank of sub-lieutenant, he was attached to the Tobolsk infantry regiment as a Подпоручик, Second Lieutenant of Russian Imperial Army. Later in September at the same year he was transferred into the 2nd battalion of the Finnish Chasseur Corps. In January 1781, he was transferred to the Dnepr Regiment, and took part in the insurrection of the Crimean Tatars. In 1783, he was promoted to a captain of the Siberian Grenadiers Regiment, at the same rank, distinguishing himself in the Russo-Turkish War (1787–1792), notably at the battle of Rymnik on 22 September 1789 and the capture of the fortress of Bender on 3–4 November 1789. Then his health deteriorated after reaching the rank of first-major, forcing him to leave the army.

Even so, in 1792, when the Polish–Russian War of 1792 broke out, Baggehufwudt rejoined the army as a volunteer. Very quickly (3 January 1793) his courage enabled him to rejoin the Russian army officially at his old rank of first-major, in his old regiment, the Siberian Grenadier Regiment. After the outbreak of the Kościuszko Uprising, during the so-called Warsaw Uprising, Baggovut took part in the intense city fights against the Polish garrison of the city and the populace of Warsaw. As the commanding officer of the 2nd battalion of Siberian Grenadier Regiment he was to secure the area of the Saxon Square and Mirów in case of an armed encounter with Polish troops, but his forces were forced to flee the city during the first hours of the battle. He then convinced General Ivan Novitski to organise a relief force and re-enter the city later that day, but this attempt was also defeated by a much smaller Polish force armed with a single gun, and Baggovut was forced to flee the city the second time when his soldiers declined to follow his orders.

On 4 November 1794, in the course of the assault on the Praga suburb of Warsaw on the right bank of the Vistula, Baggovut showed great bravery. After the Battle of Maciejowice he was promoted to lieutenant colonel. In July 1795, he was placed at the head of a Belarusian battalion. In 1798 he was put in command of the 14th Chasseur Regiment and promoted to colonel. On 29 January 1799, Baggehufwudt was promoted to major general, but on 27 July 1800 Paul I of Russia dismissed him from his post. On his accession, Alexander I recalled Baggehufwudt, made him a major general again and put him in command of 4th Mounted Chasseur Regiment (15 November 1801.

=== Napoleonic Wars 1804–1808 ===
On 26 November 1804, for his 25 years' service as an officer in the Imperial Russian army, Baggovut received the Order of Saint George (4th class). During the War of the Fourth Coalition, he was known as one of the Russian army's bravest generals. On 26 December 1806, during the Battle of Pułtusk, he protected the river Narew. For this heroic act he was given the Order of Saint George, 3rd class. At the Battle of Eylau in 1807, Baggovut received orders to hold back the enemy advance to allow the Russo-Prussian troops to take possessions of the fortifications – in the course of the fighting he was seriously wounded in the chest. He also distinguished himself at the Battle of Heilsberg and at the Battle of Friedland – at the latter, he was again seriously wounded and seriously concussed, forcing him to leave the battlefield before the end of the fighting. During this military campaign he was also promoted to lieutenant general.

=== Finnish War 1808 ===
Swedish Major General Eberhard von Vegesack landed at Lemo south of Turku with 2800 strong 19 June 1808. Baggovut commanded Russian troops. The battle lasted 18 hours and von Vegesack troops war forced to retreat back to Sweden. Later in the autumn (26 September 1808) the Swedish forces renewed the landing to Helsinki village (Taivassalo). Baggovut repelled this landing attempt too.

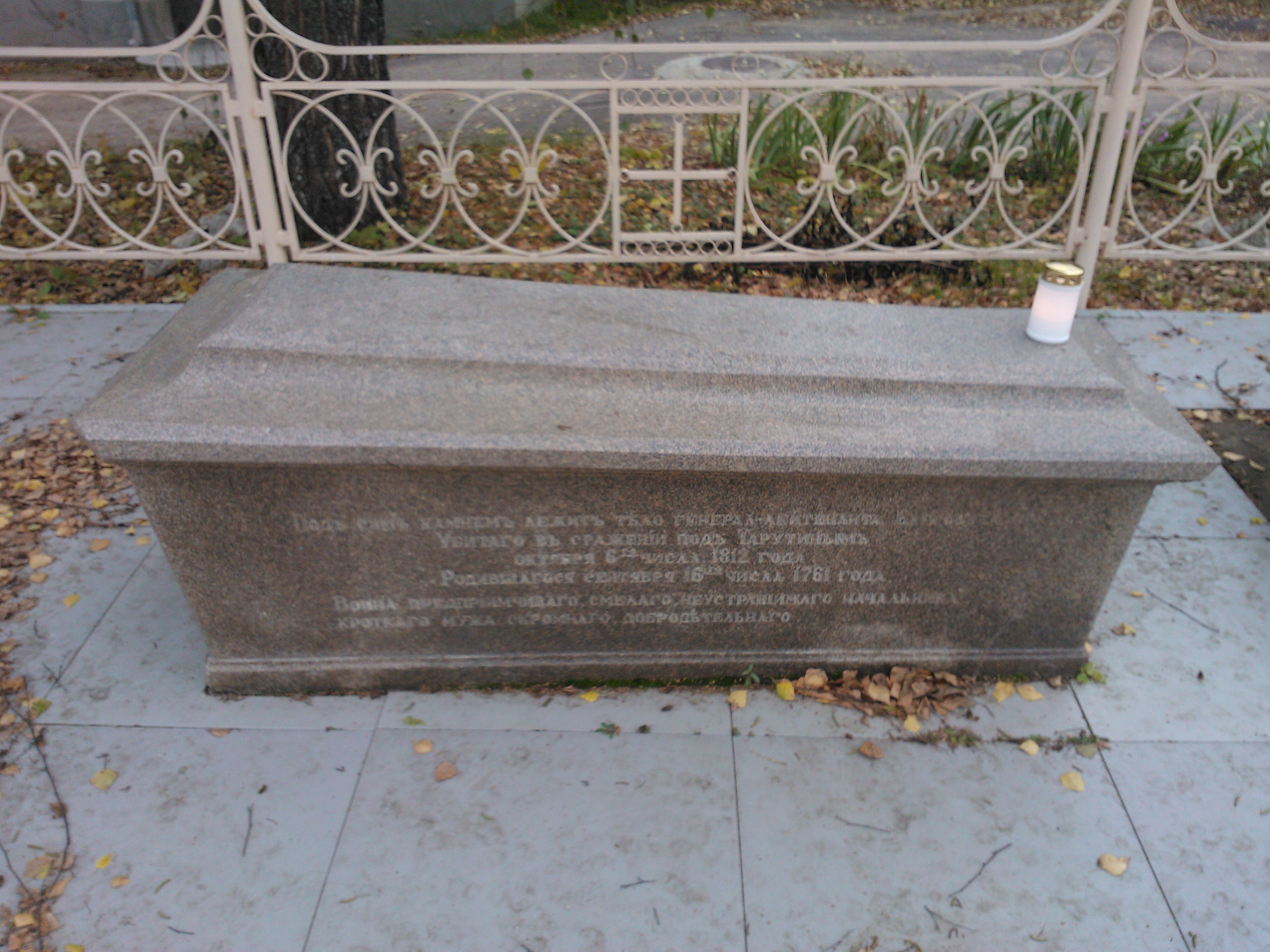
Baggovut's tomb at the Lavrentyev monastery in Kaluga, Russia

=== Napoleonic Wars 1812 ===
During Napoleon's invasion of Russia, Baggovut commanded 2nd Infantry Corps of 1st Western Army under Michael Andreas Barclay de Tolly. On 7 September 1812, at the start of the battle of Borodino, Baggovut's troops initially occupied the right wing before being displaced towards the left wing in the outskirts of the village of Outitsy during the course of the fighting. After general Nikolay Tuchkov was mortally wounded, Baggovut took over command of Russian forces on the left flank.

For his bravery at Borodino, he was given the Order of St. Alexander Nevsky, but was killed before receiving this distinction. At the Battle of Tarutino (Battle of Winkowo) on 18 October 1812, Baggovut was placed at the head of an infantry column made up of two corps. At the start of the battle, leading the Russian army's attack, he was killed by a cannonball shot by the French artillery. He was buried at the Lavrentyev monastery in Kaluga.

== Ranks ==
Rank	Army	Date of promotion
Подпоручик, Second Lieutenant	Russian Imperial Army	4 (J:24Mar) April 1779
Kапитан, Captain	Russian Imperial Army	1782
Премьер-майор, Premier/First Major	Russian Imperial Army	24 (J:13) December 1792
Подполковник, Sub-Polkovnik/Lieutenant Colonel	Russian Imperial Army	October 1794
Полковник, Colonel	Russian Imperial Army	14 (J:3) February 1798
Генерал-майор, Major General	Russian Imperial Army	09 (J:29Jan) February 1799
Генерал-лейтенант, Lieutenant General	Russian Imperial Army	24 (J:3) December 1807

== Sources ==
- "Багговут" . Brockhaus and Efron Encyclopedic Dictionary (in Russian). 1906.
