= Battle of Lemo =

1808 battle of the Finnish War

Coordinates: 60.393632°N 22.312968°E

- Part of the Finnish War
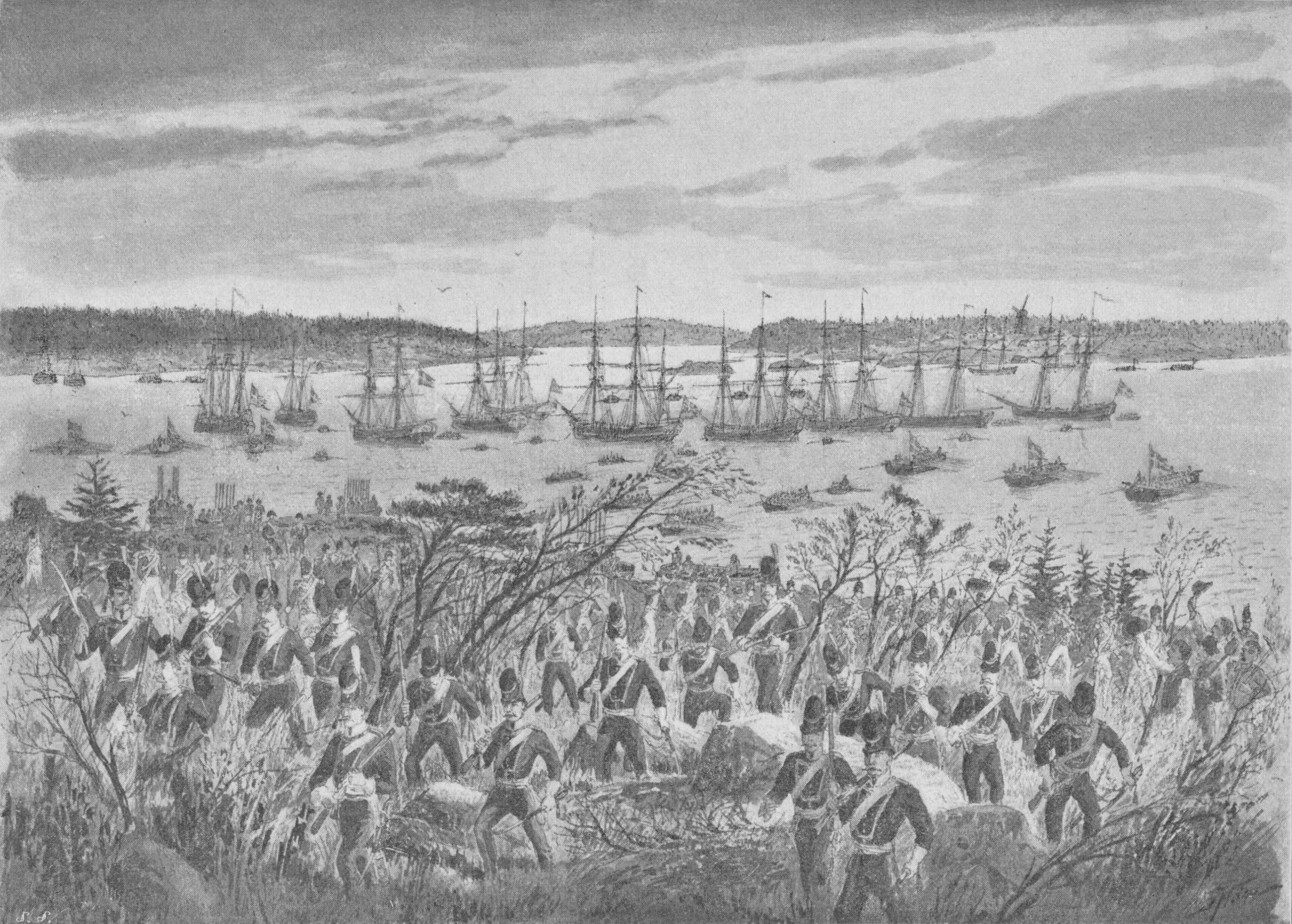
- Swedish troops landing at Lemo, by Jacob Hägg
Date	19–20 June 1808
Location	Lemo, S:t Karins (Kaarina), Finland
Result	Russian victory

Belligerents
Sweden	Russian Empire

Commanders and leaders
Eberhard von Vegesack	(Russian Empire) Karl Gustav von Baggovut

Strength
2,400–2,600; 6 guns	3,600; 8 guns

Casualties and losses
217 or 218 killed, wounded or captured	218–298 killed, wounded or captured

The Battle of Lemo was fought during the Finnish War between Sweden and Russia on 19–20 June 1808 (Julian calendar 7–8 June).

On 19 June, about 2,500 Swedes landed at Lemo (Finnish:Lemu) in Kaarina (Swedish:S:t Karins) in Southwest Finland, aided by the Swedish Navy. There, the Swedes intended to liberate Åbo (Finnish:Turku) from the Russians. The Swedish landing forces were commanded by Major General Eberhard von Vegesack. The Russian had about 3,600 men in the area under the command of Lieutenant General Karl Gustav von Baggovut.

== Battle forces ==
=== Swedish ===
Battle unit	Strength
Svea, Swedish and Finnish Guards	1 battalion (600 men)
Svea Artillery Regiment	6 guns (60 men)
Uppland Landwehr Brigade	4 battalions (1,770 men)
Life Guards of Horse	1 squadron (75 men)
Sharpshooters from Sveaborg	108 men
Finnish peasants	200 men
	2,813 men (Note: Due to sickness, only about 2,400–2,600 men participated in the actual landing.)

=== Russian ===
Battle unit	Commander	Strength	Others
Libau Infantry Regiment	Colonel Yakov Vadkovsky	6½ companies	
Brest Infantry Regiment	Colonel Peter Ivelich	½ company	
Finnish Dragoon Regiment	Major General Nikolay Borozdin	1 squadron	
Pernov (Pärnu) Musketeer Regiment	Colonel Pavel Choglokov	2 companies	
Neva Musketeer Regiment	Colonel Alexander Patton	4 companies	
		3,600 men	The Russians also had 8 guns

== Overview ==
Major General von Vegesack started immediately to entrench the landing site. The main defense line was set along the terrain facing the open field. The guns deployed to the front of Ala-Lemo Manor house. The gunboats that escorted the landing fleet were positioned at the strait so that they closed the strait and had a view to the battlefield. The Russian troops were deployed in small units along the Turku-Vyborg main road.

=== Phase 1 (Sunday 19 June) ===
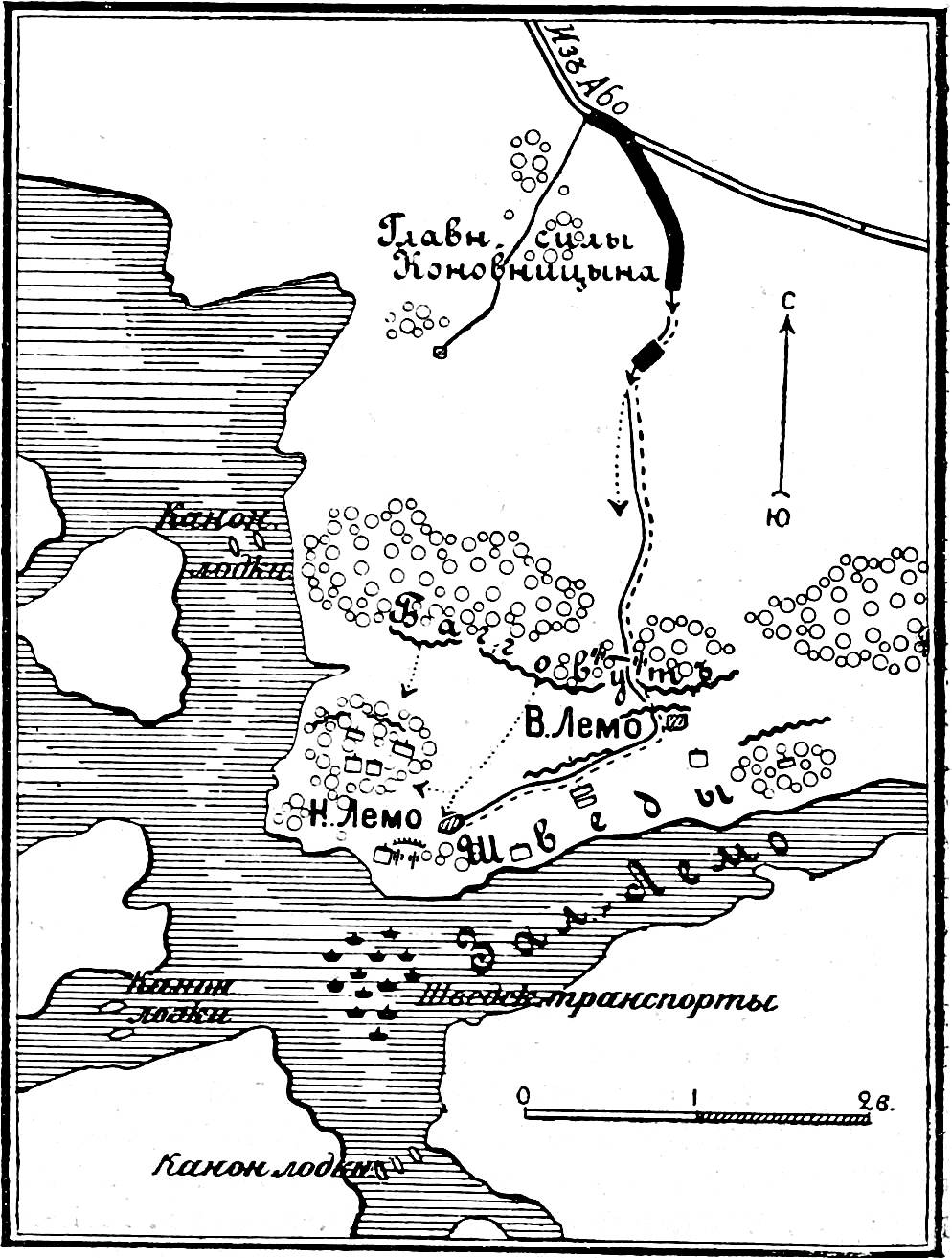
Battlefield from Russian gun positions

The initial phases of the operation were quite successful for the Swedes, who managed to advance several kilometers and eventually have Turku in sight. However, the units of the Libau Infantry Regiment with one gun launched the first Russian counterattack and they pushed the advanced Swedish troops back to the main defense line. Von Vegesack attacked immediately to the Russian center. The Russian commander Baggovut received reinforcements and he attacked with divided forces; 2 companies attacked on the right, 2 companies on the left, and 2 companies with the gun in the center. Lieutenant von Vegesack (the son of the general) found the Russian left flank open and attacked immediately. The Russians had to withdraw a few kilometers in defense. The Swedish troops followed.

=== Phase 2 (Monday 20 June) ===
Major General Nikolay Borozdin collected more reinforcements: 300 men from the Brest Infantry Regiment, two more guns, and one squadron of the Finland Dragoon Regiment. In the early morning the Libau Infantry Regiment made the Swedish troops retreat again back to the main defense line. Von Vegesack ordered all of the men from the nearby islands to the Lemo battlefield and strengthened the defense line.

Baggovut received the Pernov (Pärnu) Musketeer Regiment as additional reinforcement. The Russian launched the whole front attack with bayonets; the Pernov Regiment on the right, the Libau Regiment in the center, and the Brest Regiment on the left. The Russian artillery set fire to the Ala-Lemo Manor house. The Swedes were forced to pull back and eventually evacuate to their ships. The fortifications at the shore and later the gunboats defended the fleeing Swedes. The Russian artillery moved to the shore and fired at the Swedish fleet. Von Vegesack pulled both the land and sea forces back to the Åland Islands.

After the battle the Russian reserve forces at Yli-Lemo were 2 companies from the Nevski Regiment and ½ squadron of the Finland Dragoon Regiment.

== Legacy ==
In the summer of 2008 the monument Kuoleva Soturi ("Dying soldier") by the sculptor Heidi Limnell was erected near the Yli-Lemo Manor house in memory of all soldiers killed in the battle of Lemo. The monument was inspired by The Tales of Ensign Stål, part: Den döende krigaren.

== Notes, citations and sources ==
=== Sources ===
- Hornborg, Eirik (1955). När riket sprängdes: fälttågen i Finland och Västerbotten, 1808-1809 (in Swedish). Stockholm: P. A. Norstedts och Söners Förlag.
- Wolke, Lars Ericson; Hårdstedt, Martin (2009). Svenska sjöslag (in Swedish). Stockholm: Medströms Bokförlag. ISBN 9789173290302.

== See also ==
- Finnish War
