= Battle of Tarutino =

1812 battle during the French invasion of Russia

- Part of the French invasion of Russia
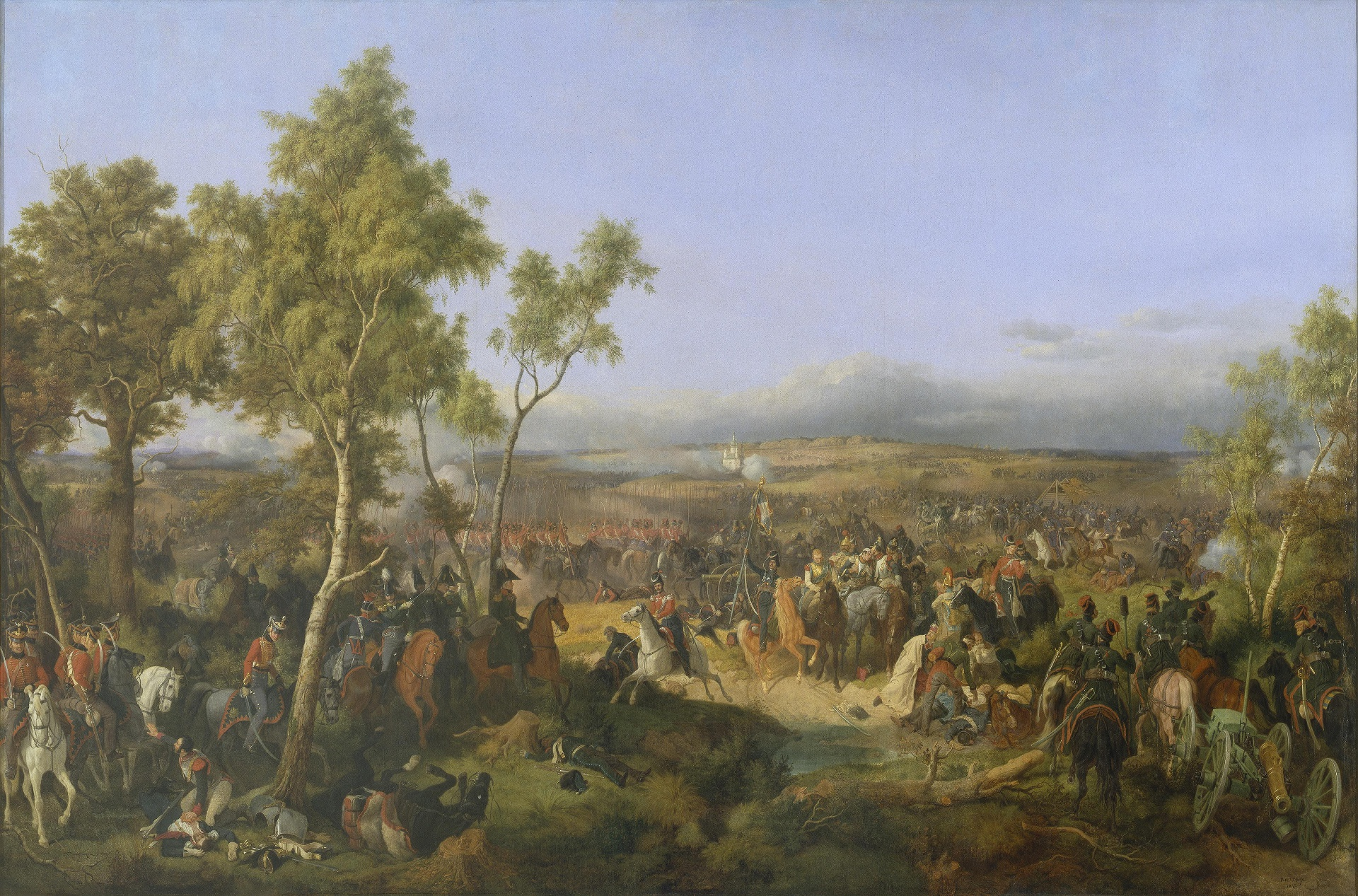
- Battle of Tarutino, by Peter von Hess
| Date | 18 October 1812 |
| Location | Tarutino, Russian Empire 55°10′38″N 37°00′10″E |
| Result | Russian victory |

Belligerents
| Russian Empire | (First French Empire) French Empire; Duchy of Warsaw |

Commanders and leaders
| (Russian Empire) Mikhail Kutuzov (Russian Empire) Levin August von Bennigsen (WIA) (Russian Empire) Vasily Orlov-Denisov (Russian Empire) Karl Gustav von Baggovut † (Russian Empire) Pavel Stroganov (Russian Empire) Alexander Ostermann-Tolstoy (Russian Empire) Mikhail Miloradovich | (Kingdom of Naples) (First French Empire) Joachim Murat (Duchy of Warsaw) Józef Poniatowski |

Strength
| 90,000 in total 36,000 engaged | 20,000–26,000 |

Casualties and losses
| 500–1,500 (Note: Estimates: • ~500; • 300 killed, 900 wounded; • 800 killed and wounded, 700 captured and missing; • ~1,500) killed, wounded, captured or missing | 2,000–4,500 (Note: Estimates: • 2,000; • 3,000+; • 2,000 killed and wounded, 1,500 captured and missing; • 3,000–4,000; • 2,000 killed, 2,000 captured; • 2,500 killed, ~2,000 captured) killed, wounded, captured or missing 36–38 guns |

French invasion of Russia
current battle
Prussian corps
Napoleon
Austrian corps

The Battle of Tarutino (18 October 1812; (Note: Old Style date: 6 October 1812) Russian: Тарутинское сражение) was a part of Napoleon's invasion of Russia. In the battle, Russian troops under the general command of Bennigsen, acting on instructions from Kutuzov and being part of his army, launched a surprise attack and defeated French troops under Murat's command. However, despite the pleas of Miloradovich and Yermolov, Kutuzov did not extend his own offensive, fearing to encounter Napoleon himself in battle, while Murat was not pursued as Bennigsen decided not to use the available forces for this purpose. The Russian infantry, stuffed with new recruits, performed heavy-handedly in this battle, and the Russians were also hampered by night delays. All this led to the Russians not being able to achieve greater success, despite their numerical superiority and surprise method. The Tarutino battle led to a breakdown in relations between Kutuzov and Bennigsen, who lost his influence in the army for certain time. In any event, the lost battle convinced Napoleon to commence the disastrous French retreat from Russia.

The battle is sometimes called the Battle of Vinkovo (French: Bataille de Winkowo) or the Battle of the Chernishnya (Russian: Сражение у реки Чернишни) after the local river. Many historians claim that the latter name is more fitting because the village of Tarutino was eight kilometres (5.0 mi) from the described events.

== Preceding events ==
After the battle of Borodino, Kutuzov realized that the Russian army would not survive one more large engagement and ordered his soldiers to retreat to the south of Moscow to reinforce his army. At first it retreated in the south-east direction along the Ryazan road. When the army reached the Moskva River it crossed it and turned to the west to the Old Kaluga road. The army pitched camp in the village of Tarutino near Kaluga. At the same time small units of Cossacks continued moving along the Ryazan road misleading French troops under the command of Murat. When he discovered his error he did not retreat but made camp not far from Tarutino in order to keep his eye on the Russian camp, while Napoleon occupied Moscow.

== Battle ==
On 18 October 1812 Kutuzov ordered Bennigsen and Miloradovich to attack Murat's corps (20,000 men) with two columns stealthily crossing the forest in the dead of night. Partisan detachments of Ivan Dorokhov and Aleksandr Figner to cut off the French retreat routes. Bennigsen's main force included three columns led by Vasily Orlov-Denisov, Karl Gustav von Baggovut (including Pavel Stroganov's reserve group) and Alexander Osterman-Tolstoy respectively. The other column was supposed to play an auxiliary role. In the darkness most of the troops got lost. By the morning only Cossack troops under the command of General Orlov-Denisov reached the original destination, suddenly attacked the French troops and captured the French camp with transports and cannons. Russian II and III Infantry Corps, under generals Baggovut and Stroganov respectively, also had some success. When stronger forces of the Russians emerged from the forest, namely IV Infantry Corps under General Osterman-Tolstoy (Ostermann-Tolstoy), they came under French fire and suffered casualties, and since these Russian units came late the French were able to recover: the continuing disorder among the French was prevented by the appearance of Murat himself, and counterattacks by the French cavalry restored the balance. Murat was forced to retreat to escape being surrounded, but the Russian general Baggovut was killed, while Bennigsen's leg was bruised by a shell and he stopped an advance.^{[ru]} The French forces suffered at least 2,000 casualties, whilst 12 cannons, 20 caissons, and 30 train-waggons had been taken, two generals killed; the Russians lost 500 men or more.

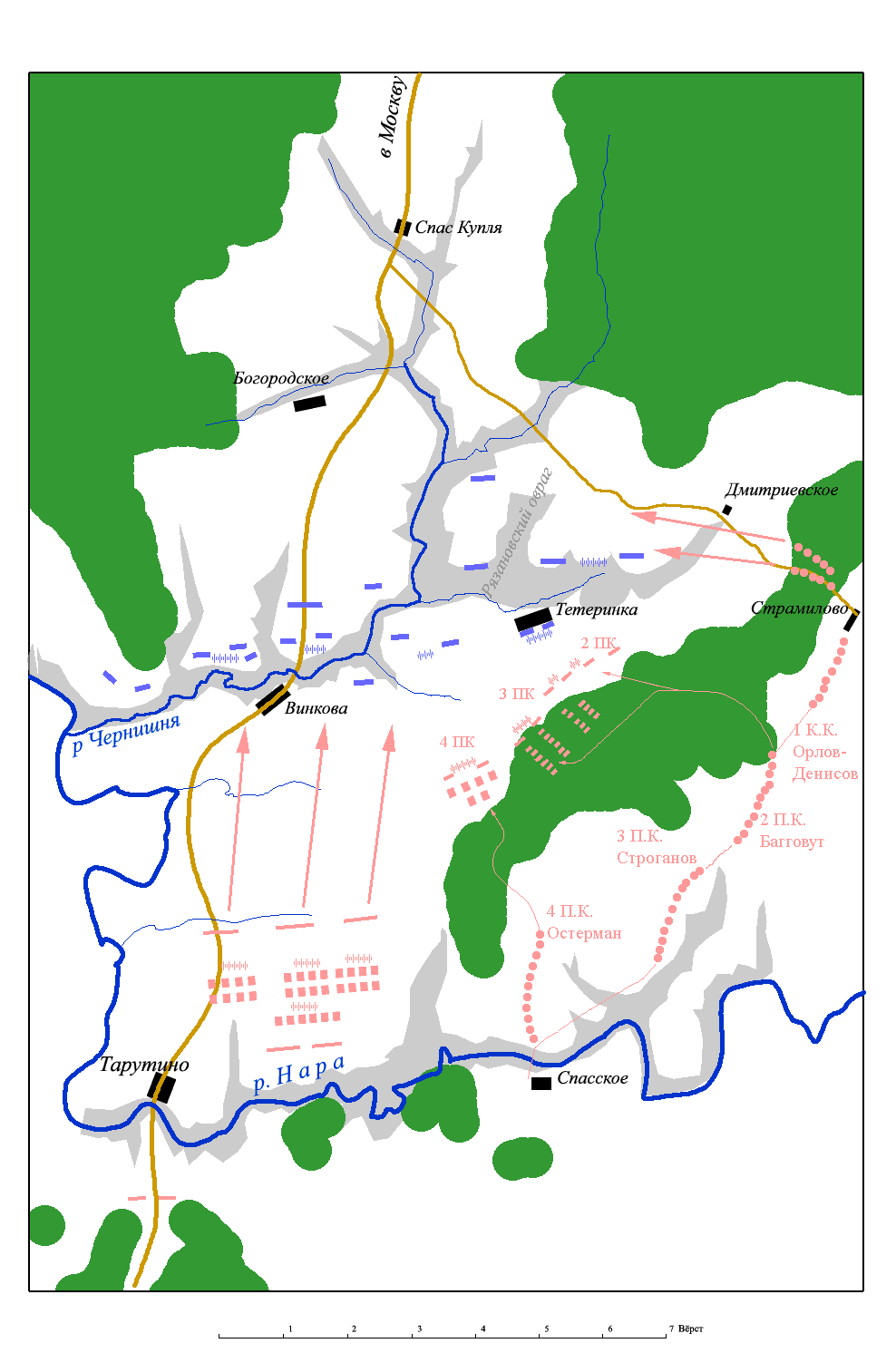
Battle map (in Russian). From left to right: Osterman-Tolstoy's 4th Infantry Corps, Stroganov's 3rd Infantry Corps, Baggovut's 2nd Infantry Corps, Orlov-Denisov's 1st Cavalry Corps

== Aftermath ==
Bennigsen and Kutuzov did not dare to continue to build on their success: Bennigsen did not want to continue the fight with the force he had, and Kutuzov ordered a withdrawal to the Russian camp to avoid encountering "a strong French reinforcement sent by Napoleon." In a letter to Alexander, Bennigsen blamed Kutuzov for everything, losing all of his influence in the army (instead of answering the letter, Alexander forwarded it to Kutuzov). However, the battle was still a significant victory for the Russians, boosting the morale of their forces, destroying valuable French cavalry units, and demonstrating that Napoleon's once formidable army could be defeated on the battlefield. One day later, Napoleon started his own retreat from Moscow on 19 October 1812 southwards in the direction of Kaluga. The next major battle was the Battle of Maloyaroslavets.

Bennigsen would continue his service after Kutuzov's death in Bolesławiec on 28 April 1813; he would lead the so-called "Army of Poland" in the Wars of Liberation.

== In popular culture ==
The battle is depicted in Leo Tolstoy's War and Peace. In the novel, Tolstoy claims that while the battle did not achieve any of its goals, it was exactly what the Russian army needed at the time, in that it exposed the weakness of the French army and gave Napoleon the push needed to begin his retreat.

== See also ==
- List of battles of the French invasion of Russia

== Sources ==
- Bourgogne, Adrien Jean Baptiste François, Memoirs of Sergeant Bourgogne, 1812-1813 Bourgogne, Adrien Jean Baptiste François, Memoirs of Sergeant Bourgogne, 1812-1813 access-date=7 March 2021
- Chandler, David, The Campaigns of Napoleon New York, Macmillan, 1966 Chandler, David G., The Campaigns of Napoleon Access-date=7 March 2021
- Weider, Ben and Franceschi, Michel, The Wars Against Napoleon: Debunking the Myth of the Napoleonic Wars, 2007 Weider, Ben and Franceschi, The Wars Against Napoleon: Debunking the Myth of the Napoleonic Wars access-date=7 March 2021
- Zamoyski, Adam, Moscow 1812: Napoleon's Fatal March, 1980 Zamoyski, Adam, Moscow 1812, Napoleon's Fatal March access-date=7 March 2021
- Bodart, Gaston (1908). Militär-historisches Kriegs-Lexikon (1618-1905).
- Polovtsov, Alexander (1900). Russian Biographical Dictionary. Vol. II: Алексинский—Бестужев-Рюмин. St. Petersburg: Типография Главного Управления Уделов. pp. 700–712.
- "Тарутино". Brockhaus and Efron Encyclopedic Dictionary: In 86 Volumes (82 Volumes and 4 Additional Volumes). St. Petersburg. 1890–1907.

| Preceded by Siege of Burgos | Napoleonic Wars; Battle of Tarutino | Succeeded by Second Battle of Polotsk |
