= Tarutino, Russia =

Tarutino Тару́тино
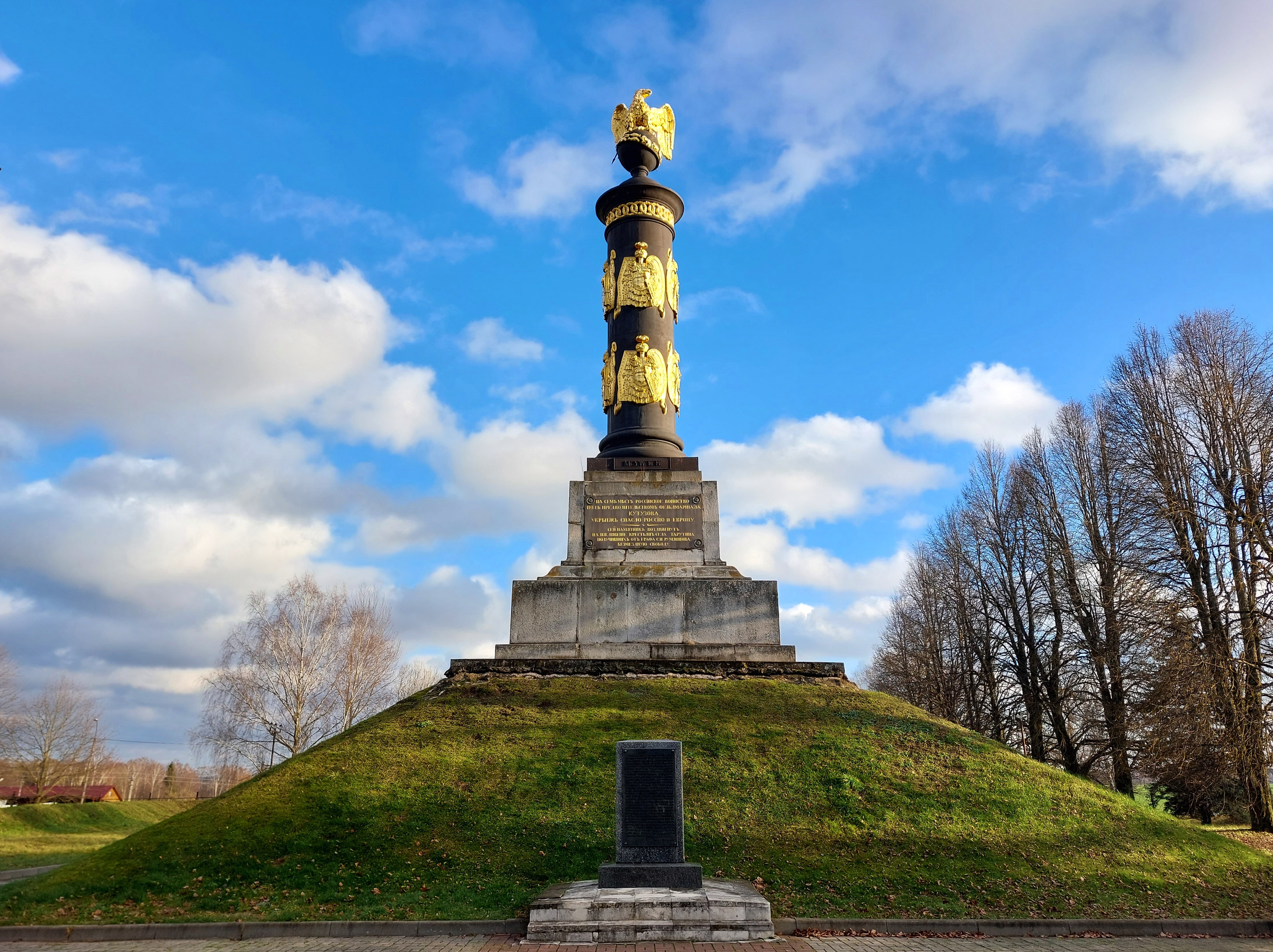
- Monument to the Battle of Tarutino (1812)
- Interactive map of Tarutino
- Location of Tarutino
- Coordinates: 55°07′20″N 36°56′26″E
- Country: Russia
- Federal subject: Kaluga Oblast

Population (2010 Census)
  - Total: 496
  - Estimate (2010): 496 (0%)
- Time zone: UTC+3 (MSK)
- Postal code: 249165
- OKTMO ID: 29613436101

Tarutino (Russian: Тару́тино) is a rural locality (a selo) in Zhukovsky District of Kaluga Oblast, Russia, located on the Nara River 35 kilometers (22 mi) from Maloyaroslavets. It has an altitude of 262 meters (860 ft). It has a population of 733.

The 1812 Battle of Tarutino in Napoleon's invasion of Russia took place eight kilometers from the village.

== History ==
The village of Tarutino was part of Zayachkov volost, which Prince Simeon the Proud, in a treaty with his brothers dated 1348, referred to as having been received from his aunt Princess Anna. The village is mentioned as part of the volost in 1486, under the spiritual jurisdiction of Prince Mikhail Andreyevich.

Since the end of the 17th century, the village of Tarutino was under the feudal ownership of the House of Naryshkin. The last owner from this noble family was Alexander Alexandrovich Naryshkin. Upon his passing, the village was inherited by his wife Anna Nikitichna Naryshkina, who bequeathed the land to her nephew Nikolai Rumyantsev, and later his younger brother Sergei Rumyantsev, who would be the last of the Rumyantsev line.

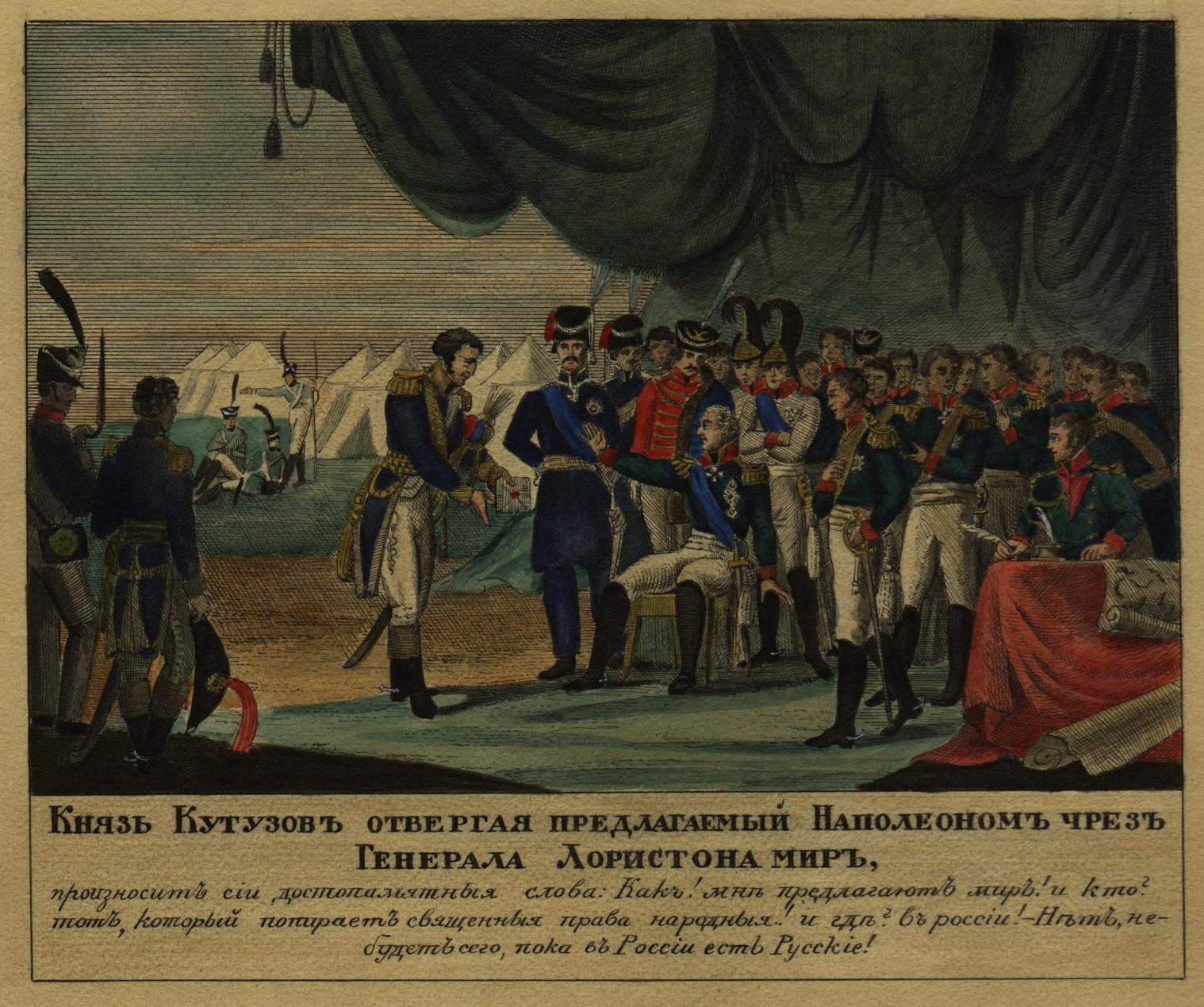
Prince Mikhail Kutuzov and Ambassador Jacques Lauriston in Tarutino.

Following the retreat of the Imperial Russian Army from Moscow, the village was the site of the Battle of Tarutino in Napoleon's invasion of Russia. On 18 October 1812, Russian troops of Prince Mikhail Kutuzov's army, under the command of Graf von Bennigsen, launched a surprise attach on French troops under the command of Joachim Murat. French forces were forced to retreat under attack from Cossack troops of Count Orlov-Denisov, suffering heavy casualties, while Russian losses were light, with a notable exception being the death of Karl Gustav von Baggehufwudt to French cannon fire. The battle boosted Russian morale in the wake of the French occupation of Moscow, and marked the beginning of a strategic counteroffensive that would eventually drive Napoleon out of Russia.

In 1829, landowner Count Sergey Petrovich Rumyantsev stated in his will that 745 peasants under his ownership be freed from serfdom, on the condition that a monument to the battle be built.

A school was opened in Tarutino in 1846. The school is still operational, and has been located in the village Palace of Culture since 1992.

In the document List of Settlements of the Kaluga Province, published by the Ministry of Internal Affairs, the village is described as having 119 households, 948 inhabitants, a fair and weekly markets, as well as a school and orthodox church.

Tarutino was occupied by Nazi forces from October to December 1941, with an anti-aircraft battery being stationed close to the monument. Upon retreating from the area, the area was heavily mined.

On 17 May 2023, a Ukrainian Air Force Tupolev Tu-141 Strizh unmanned reconnaissance aircraft was shot down over Tarutino, with the wreckage landing in the forested area between the settlement and the Moscow Big Ring Road.

In 2025, the Russian Minister of Culture Olga Lyubimova announced plans for the further development of the settlement, including a new museum building, historical trails and hotel.

== Notable landmarks ==
=== Tarutino Memorial Complex of Military Glory ===
==== Monument to the Battle of Tarutino ====
The original monument to the Battle of Tarutino was built based on the will of Count Sergey Petrovich Rumyantsev. The monument was inaugurated on 25 June 1834 with a parade salute from the Ryazan Infantry Regiment.

With the establishment of the Ministry of State Property, Tarutino and the surrounding area came under the jurisdiction of the ministry from 1955. Repairs were carried out according to the design of the architect Antonelli. In 1912, for the hundred anniversary the site was designated as a "Monument of Actual Merit", and received renovations, including renewed gilding, paint, and a board listing the Russian order of battle.

Following the Russian Civil War, the removal of the monument was considered by the People's Commissariat for Education in 1932. However, the office reportedly had limited information on the artistic details of the monument, only briefly mentioned in the Brockhaus and Efron Encyclopedic Dictionary. As a result, the issue was dropped. However, by 1940, the board installed in 1912 listing the order of battle was removed.

Renovations were carried out for the 100th, 150th and 200th anniversary of the Patriotic War of 1812 in 1912, 1962 and 2012 respectively. In 2012, the Central Bank of Russia issued a five-ruble coin depicting the monument. The site is included in the Russian cultural heritage register.

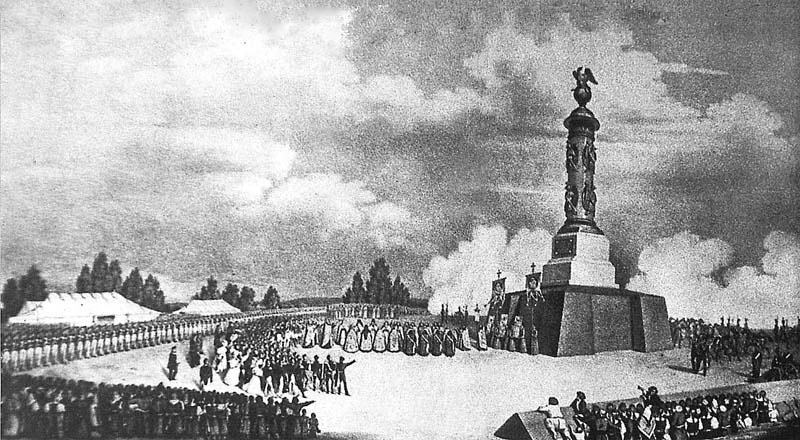
Unveiling of the Monument in Taruntino, 1834.

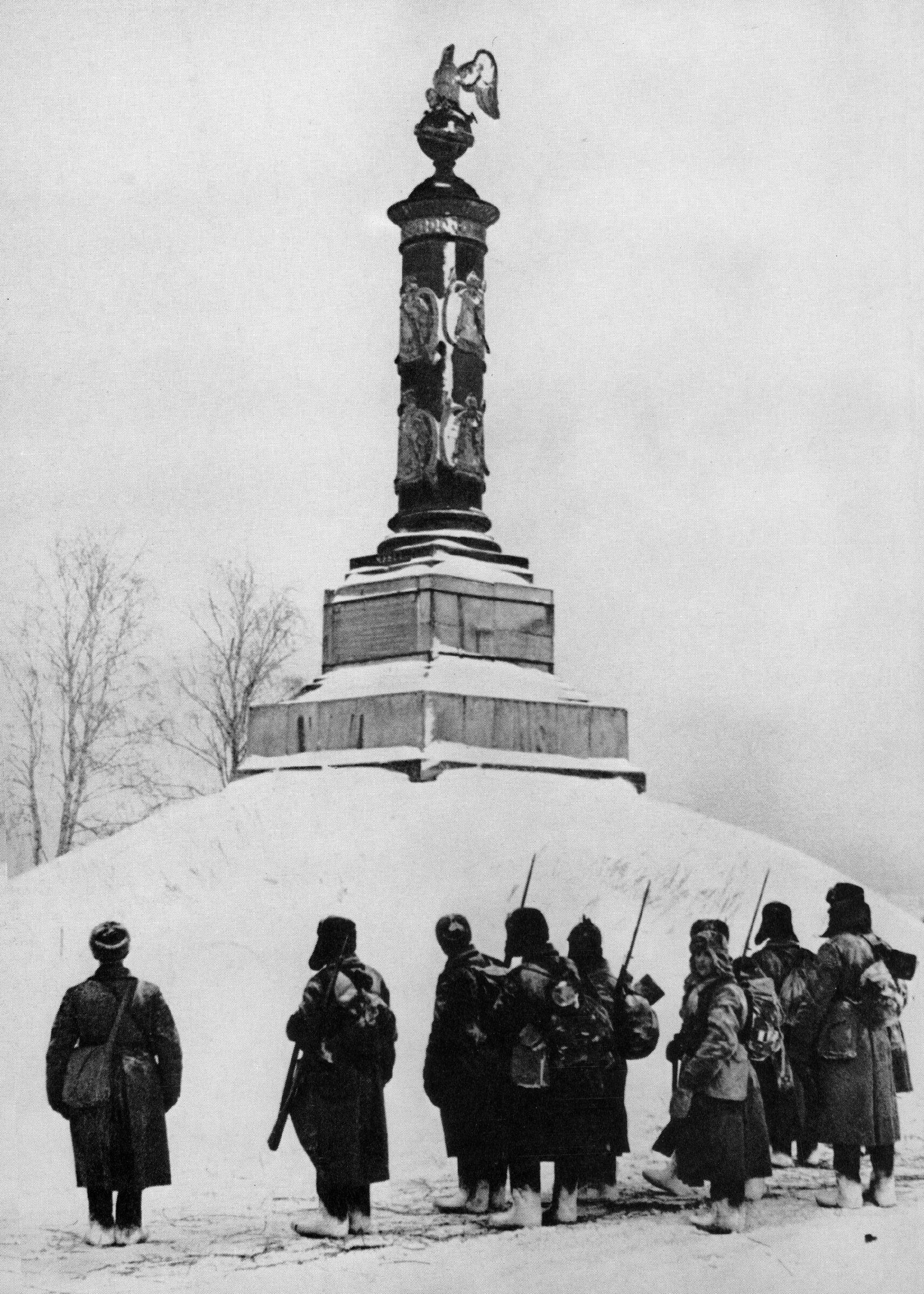
Red Army soldiers in Tarutino, December 1941.

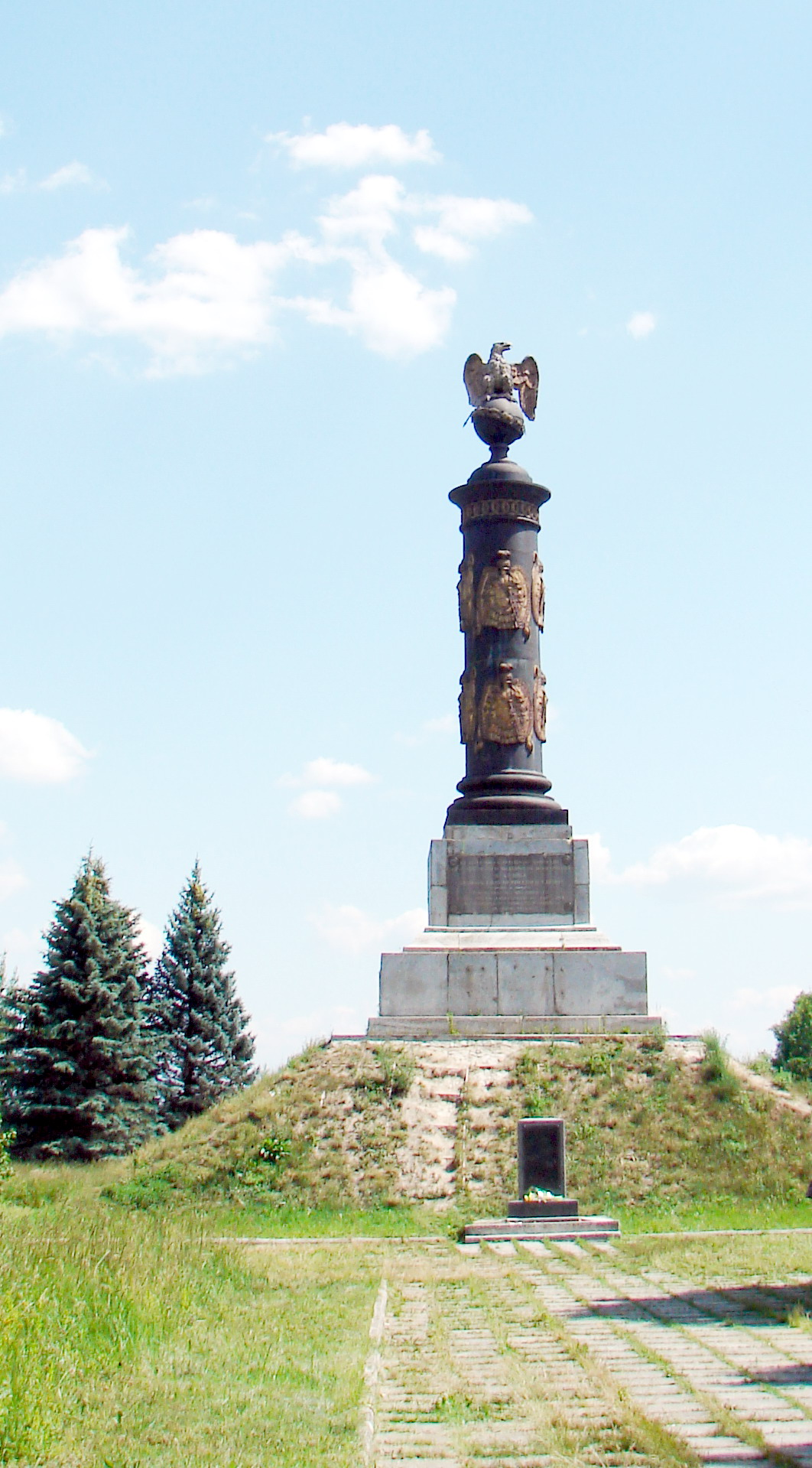
Prior to the most recent restoration, 2007

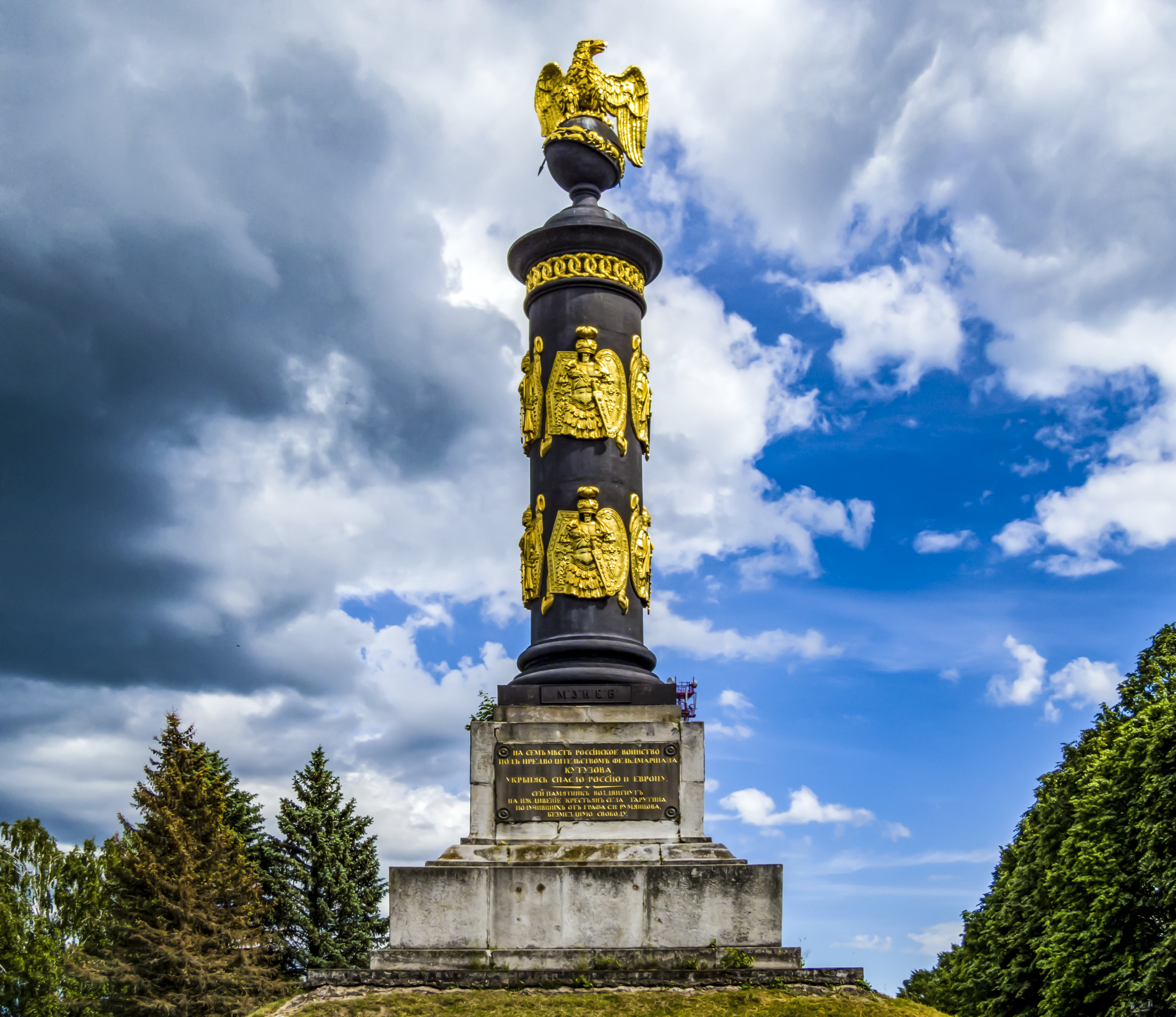
Monument following restoration for the 200th anniversary of the battle, 2022.

==== Mass Grave of Soviet Soldiers ====
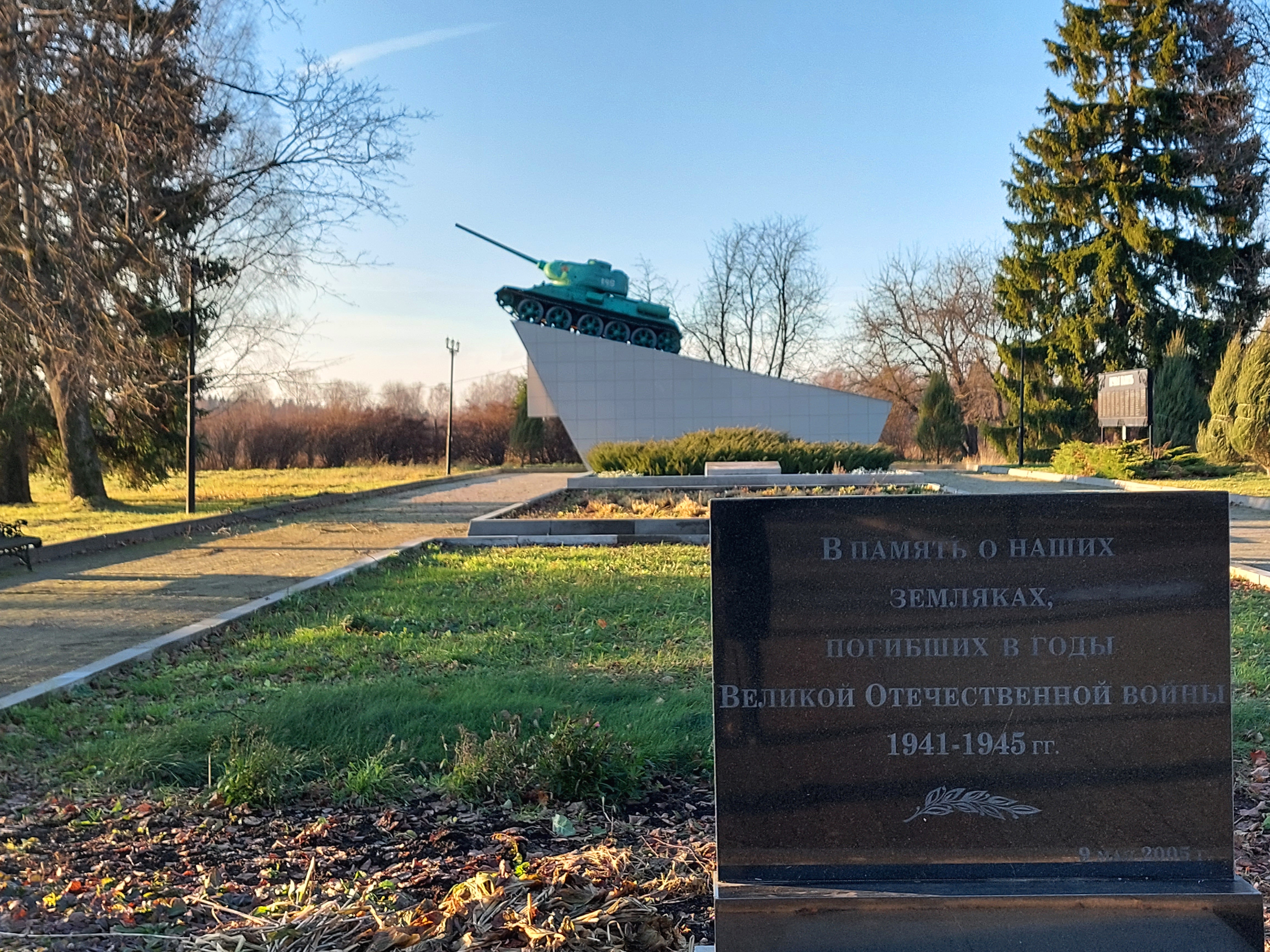
Great Patriotic War memorial

Soldiers of the Red Army who died between October to December 1941 during the Great Patriotic War, from the 17th Rifle Division and 53rd Rifle Division are buried in a flowerbed covered mass grave. A memorial board lists the six-hundred and thirty nine soldiers buried. In 2005 an additional marble memorial plaque was added. Behind the graves, a T-34 tank is mounted on a plinth.

==== Tarutino Museum of Military History ====
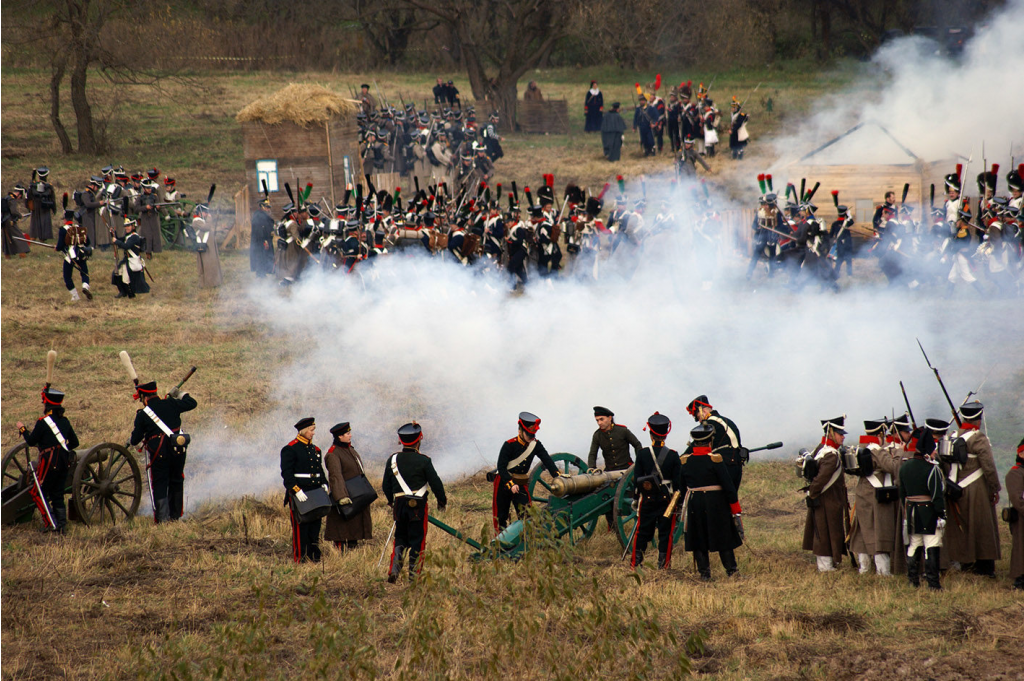
Reenactment of the Battle of Tarutino by the Russian Military Historical Society.

The museum was opened in 1962 by a local teacher named V. Sinelshchikov and worked on a volunteer basis. In 1967 it became a branch of the Kaluga Regional History Museum. The museum is located next to the Tarutino Monument and Soviet Mass Grave. In addition, a number of fortification remains and redoubts remain in the vicinity of the site.

=== St. Nicholas Church ===
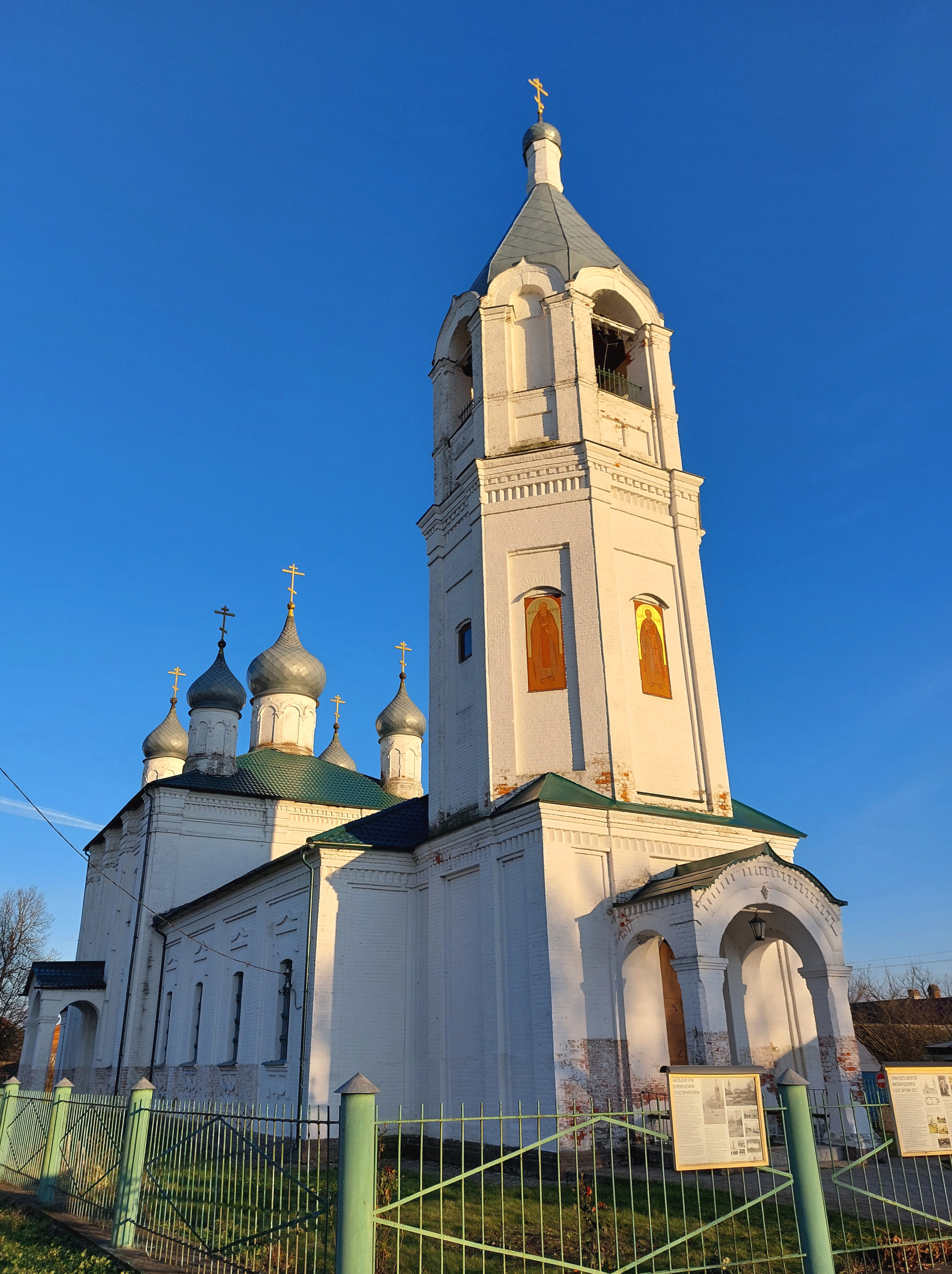
Church of St. Nicholas the Wonderworker

In 1654 it was recorded that a church was erected in patronage of Saint Nicholas the Wonderworker. A new wooden church would be built in 1735, after its predecessor was destroyed in a fire.

The present stone church was constructed in 1872, using building resources that had been given to the freed serfs by Rumyantsev.

The old wooden building was dismantled, and a new brick chapel was built in its place in 1875. The chapel would later be converted into a residential building and lost its cross, but is currently undergoing renovation.

Following the Soviet anti-religious campaigns of the 1920s, the church was closed. In 1941, it was used by German occupation forces to imprison the village residents. Due to the extreme cold of the winter of 1941-1942, sections of the wooden interior, including the iconostatis were burned for warmth. Following the end of German occupation, the temple was used as a granary.

In 1947, Soviet authorities relented to pressure, and the Church was reconsecrated, with its rector Archpriest Tikhon released from prison. As a house was not available, Tikhon lived within the old chapel from 1947 to 1993. The church came under threat again during Nikita Khrushchev's anti-religious campaigns, but was saved by Tikhon's refusal to leave the village, even after being offered a city apartment building.

The church has three altars, dedicated to Saint Sergius of Radonezh, Saint Nicholas of Myra and Saint Paphnutius of Borovsk.

== See also ==
- Battle of Tarutino
