= Attrition warfare against Napoleon =

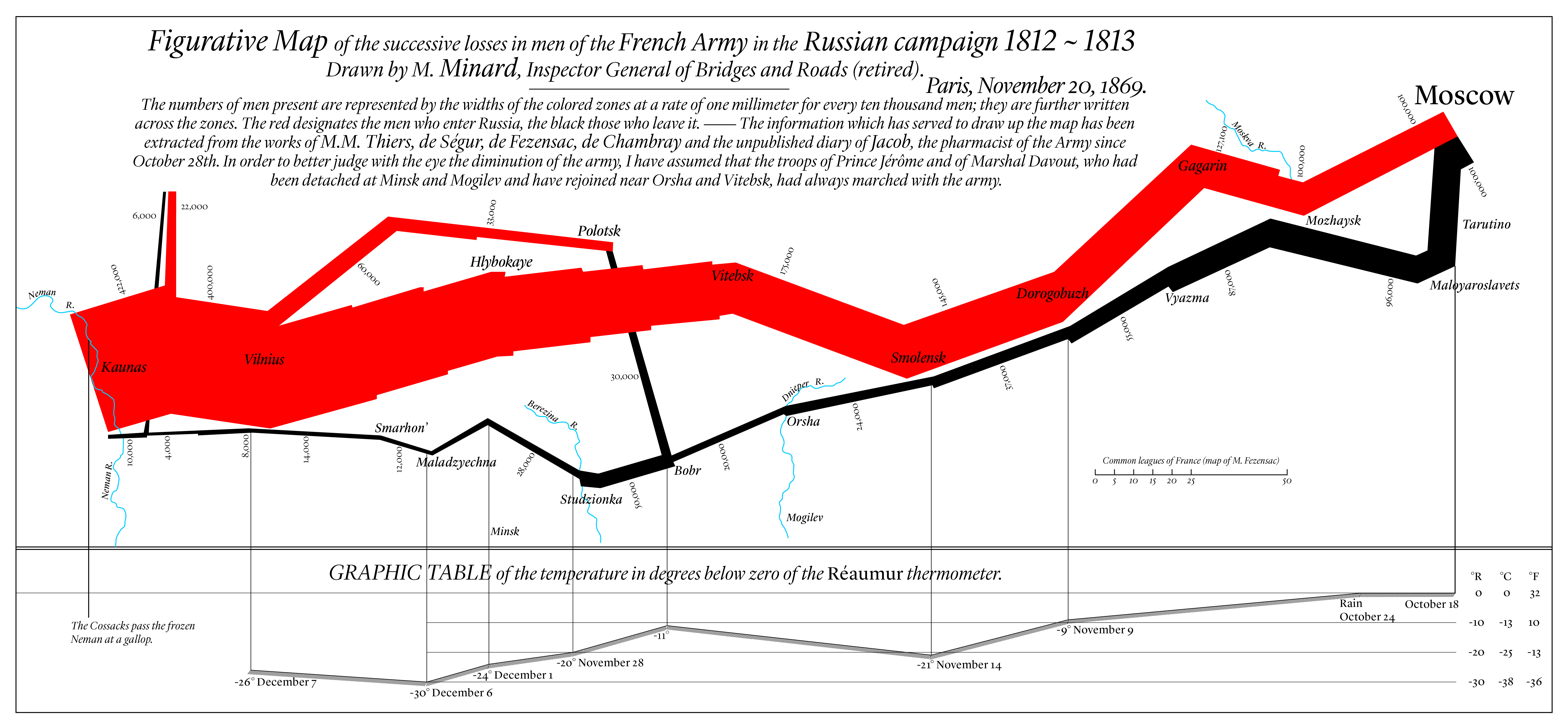
Minard's Map of French Casualties, modern version

Attrition warfare represents an attempt to grind down an opponent's ability to make war by destroying their military resources by any means possible, including scorched earth, people's war, guerrilla warfare and all kinds of battles apart from a decisive battle. Elements of this kind of warfare had already been used in the Peninsular War.

The Russian attrition warfare against Napoleon began on 24 June 1812 when Napoleon's Grande Armée crossed the Neman River into Russia and ended on 14 December 1812 with the total defeat of the Grande Armée. A visual representation is given by the drawing of Charles Joseph Minard. The Trachenberg Plan was used by the Sixth Coalition in Germany in 1813 and in France in 1814. The Seventh Coalition defeated him at the Waterloo in 1815 and exiled him to Saint Helena, where he died six years later.

== Scorched earth policy ==
=== Portugal ===
Peninsular War
Torres Vedras
The Lines of Torres Vedras defend the only path to Lisbon from the north.

The Peninsular War had started in Portugal with the Invasion of Portugal (1807) and went on until 1814. In September 1810 Masséna made the third French attempt to occupy Portugal with his 65,000 strong army fighting in the Battle of Bussaco, but Wellington pulled back his army southwards. The French army under Masséna pursued Wellington and discovered a barren land without inhabitants, as the Portuguese peasants had left their farms after destroying all food they could not take with them and anything else that might be useful to the French as required by the scorched earth policy. On 11 October 1810, Massena with 61,000 men found Wellington behind an almost impenetrable defensive position, the Lines of Torres Vedras consisting of forts and other military defences built in absolute secrecy to defend the only path to Lisbon from the north. The lack of food and fodder meant that Masséna was forced to retreat northwards, starting on the night of 14/15 November 1810, to find an area that had not been subjected to the scorched earth policy. The French held out through February although the Iberian peninsula had suffered one of the coldest winters it had ever known, but when starvation and diseases really set in, Masséna ordered a retreat at the beginning of March 1811 having lost another 21,000 men.

=== Russia ===
French invasion of Russia
Napoleon uses the same path between Smolensk and Borodino (dark red) back and forth.

The French invasion of Russia had started with the crossing of the Neman on 24 June 1812. Napoleon made his attempt to occupy Russia with a 600,000 strong army, but Barclay pulled back his Russian army eastwards. The French army pursued Barclay and discovered a poor land with few inhabitants, as the Russian army had destroyed all food they could not take with them and anything else that might be useful to the French as required by the scorched earth policy. On 7 September 1812, Napoleon with 115,000 men found Kutuzov in Borodino in a bad defensive position blocking the only path to Moscow from the west. Napoleon defeated him and occupied a burning Moscow. But Napoleon was forced to retreat, starting on the 19 October 1812, and tried to find southwards an area that had not been subjected to the scorched earth policy. Kutuzov blocked this way at the Battle of Maloyaroslavets successfully. The French retreated westwards the same already devastated way they had come but starvation, diseases like epidemic typhus and hypothermia (Russia suffered a cold winter in November and December) really set in and Napoleon lost 500,000 men in total in Russia.

==== Retreat of the defending army ====
The constant retreat of the Russian Army in the beginning of the war forced Napoleon to rapid marches in great heat to catch up with them. His supply trains had to be even faster and were not able to reach their soldiers in time. Clausewitz wrote that the status of the retreating army and the pursuing army differs enormously. The first might live in superfluity while the other army might slowly starve. The army in retreat is consuming and collecting anything useful and destroying the rest creating scorched earth, whilst the pursuer must have everything brought after him with a supply organization that must be faster than the army itself. During the constant retreat from Moscow to Poland of the Grande Armée, Kutuzov with his main army avoided following Napoleon directly. Kutuzov escorted the Grande Armée on parallel roads in unspoilt regions of the south thus saving great parts of his army.

== People's war ==
=== Spain ===
Peninsular War: Spain
current battle
Wellington in command
Wellington not in command

On the 2 May 1808 the Dos de Mayo Uprising took place in the outskirts of Madrid. It was a rebellion by the people of Madrid against the occupation of the city by Napoleon's troops, provoking repression by the French Imperial forces using the Mamelukes of the Imperial Guard of Napoleon to fight residents of Madrid wearing turbans and using curved scimitars, thus provoking memories of the Muslim Spain.

=== Russia ===
In the Patriotic War of 1812, Lieutenant-Colonel Denis Davydov suggested to his general, Pyotr Bagration to attack the supply trains of Napoleon's invading Grande Armée with a small force. He started as requested as a separate command in the rear of the Grande Armée wearing peasant clothes and a beard to ensure the support of the Russian peasants. Davydov gave captured food and French weapons to the peasants and taught them how to fight a people's war.

== Guerrilla warfare ==
=== Spain ===
The word guerrilla was invented in the Peninsular War. The guerrilla style of fighting was the Spanish military's single most effective tactic. The guerrilla fighters tied down large numbers of French troops over a wide area with a much lower expenditure of men, energy, and supplies.

=== Russia ===
Davydov's small force captured French forage-expeditions, supply-trains with food, horses, weapons and ammunition, freed Russian prisoners and integrated them as volunteers with French horses and weapons into their raiding party. These actions set off an avalanche of guerrilla warfare.

== Conventional warfare ==
Conventional warfare is a form of warfare conducted by using battlefield tactics between two or more states in open confrontation. The forces on each side are well-defined and fight by using weapons that target primarily the opponent's military.

=== Portugal ===
After probing the Lines of Torres Vedras in the Battle of Sobral on 14 October, Masséna found them too strong to attack and withdrew into winter quarters. Deprived of food for his men and harried by Anglo-Portuguese hit-and-run tactics, he lost a further 25,000 men captured or dead from starvation or sickness before he retreated. This finally freed Portugal from French occupation.

=== Spain ===
The guerrilla fighters facilitated the conventional victories of Wellington and his Anglo-Portuguese army.

=== Austria ===
The battle of Aspern-Essling was the first time Napoleon had been personally defeated in a major battle, as the Danube bridges had been cut by heavy barges, which had been sent drifting down stream by the Austrians thus destroying Napoleon's supply line.

=== Russia ===
Napoleon lost more than 500,000 men in Russia, but the losses reported in battles sum up to only 175,000.

=== Germany France Spain ===
The Trachenberg Plan was a campaign strategy created by the Allies in 1813. The plan advocated avoiding direct engagement with Napoleon. The Allies planned to engage and defeat Napoleon's marshals separately, and thus weaken his army while they built up an overwhelming force even he could not defeat.

=== Waterloo ===
Wellington's position at Waterloo was a strong defensive one. It consisted of a long ridge running east–west. Along the crest of the ridge ran the a deep sunken lane. Wellington deployed his infantry in a line just behind the crest of the ridge. Using the reverse slope, as he had many times in the Peninsular War, Wellington concealed his strength from Napoleon, with the exception of his skirmishers and artillery. In front of the ridge, there were three positions that had been fortified. On the extreme right was the Hougoumont (farmhouse). The house faced north along a sunken, covered lane along which it could be supplied. On the extreme left was the hamlet of Papelotte. Papelotte also commanded the road to Wavre that the Prussians would use to send reinforcements to Wellington's position. In front of the rest of Wellington's line, was the farmhouse of La Haye Sainte. On the opposite side of the road was a disused sand quarry, where the 95th Rifles were posted as sharpshooters. Wellington's forces positioning presented a formidable challenge to any attacking force.

== Impact ==
=== Portugal ===
Massena's campaign had cost at least 25,000 men. As many as 50,000 Portuguese peasants starved to death in 1810 as a result of the scorched earth policy.

==== Buçaco≈65,000 men ====
27 September 1810: Marshal Masséna had begun his campaign with his 65,000 strong army (l'Armée de Portugal).

==== Torres Vedras≈61,000 men ====
11 October 1810: After losing 4,000 at the Battle of Buçaco, Masséna arrived at Torres Vedras with 61,000 men.

==== Fuentes de Oñoro≈40,000 men ====
3 May 1811: When he eventually returned to Spain in April 1811 and before he fought the battle of Fuentes de Oñoro, he had lost a further 21,000 men, mostly from starvation, severe illness and disease. Casualties had not been helped by the fact that the Iberian peninsula had suffered one of the coldest winters it had ever known.

=== Spain ===
In the Peninsula War Napoleon lost at least 91,000 men in battle and 237,000 wounded. Including those who died of disease, accident and exhaustion, the French toll may have between 180,000-240,000 deaths.

=== Russia ===
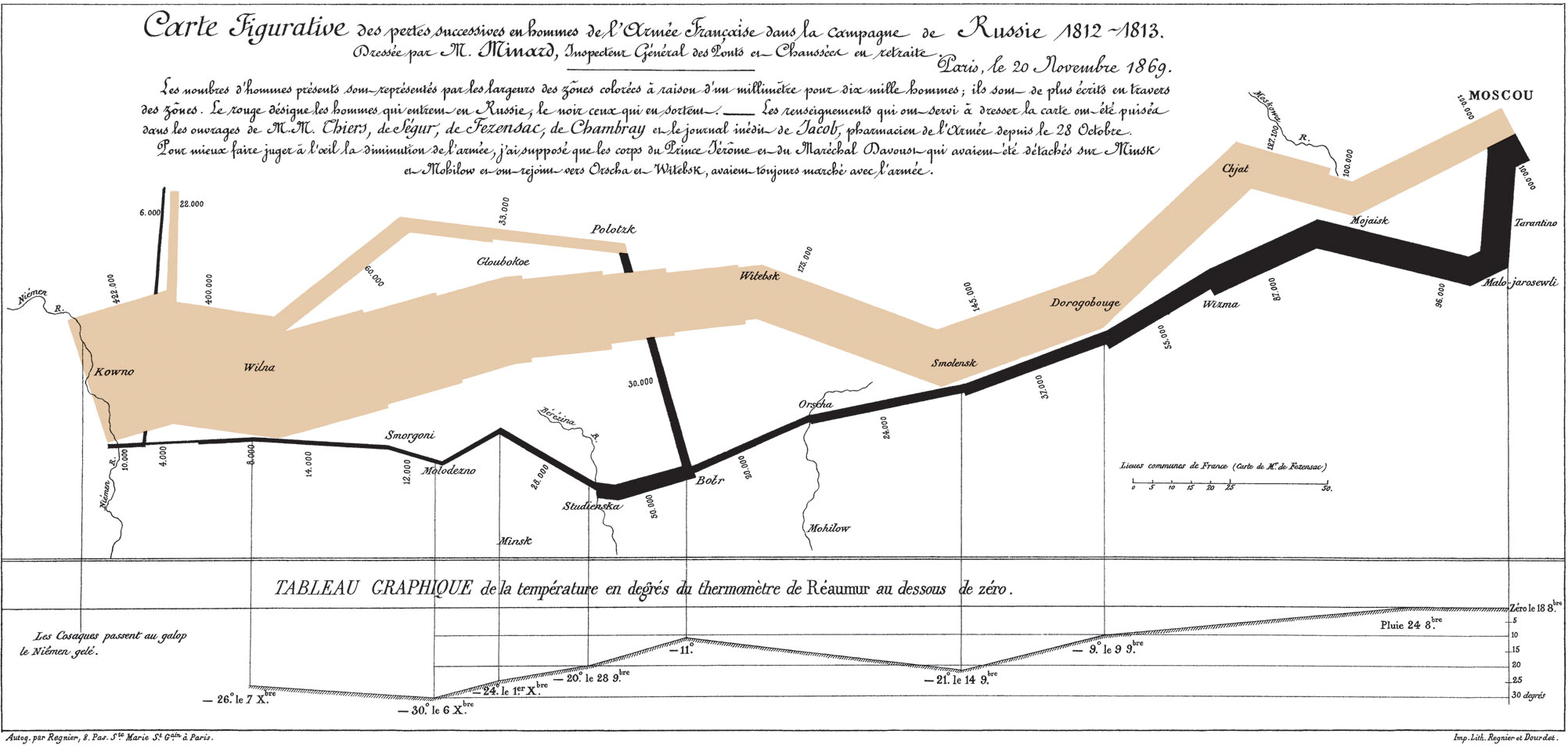
Minard's Map of French Casualties

To estimate the attrition rate caused by the Russian Fabian strategy, the numbers of soldiers of the Grande Armée are roughly taken from Minard's Map that were based on French sources. The later detachments are subtracted from the main army from the beginning until they have left it. Finally the results are rounded to a multiple of 10,000. By that the numbers are comparable with each other to assess losses. Caused by this correction Napoleon started at Kowno with ≈340,000 men and not with ≈422,000 according to Minard's map. The number of French soldiers in the headings should give only a feeling for the impact of attrition warfare on Napoleon's part of the Grande Armée that left Russia with less than 5,000 soldiers.

==== Kowno≈340,000 men ====
26 June 1812, 3rd bulletin: The Grande Armée had crossed the Neman River supported by logistics based on water transport of food for the troops up to Wilna, consisting mainly of flour, brandy and biscuit.

The transport of water for men and horses was not centrally organized. In addition, as the invasion started in the summer, the troops should provide the fodder for the horses from the fields ready for harvest.

==== Wilna≈330,000 men ====
30 June 1812, 4th bulletin: The Russian army was retreating into the interior of Russia eastwards after setting fire to their own magazines. They avoided major battles.

6 July 1812, 5th bulletin: The Russian army was retreating eastwards after setting fire to their own magazines. The weather changed from extreme heat to very severe cold to heavy rain and thunderstorms. Wilna was made the French base for supplies and gigantic magazines were created and filled using boats over rivers.

11 July 1812, 6th bulletin: The French army used forced marches to follow the Russian army. The heat appeared to be violent.

16 July 1812, 7th bulletin: The French supply using boats worked extremely well. The Russian army was retreating eastwards after setting fire to their own magazines.

The first main problem for the French army was the feeding of the horses as it was not possible to find enough fodder in sufficient quality for all of them as they passed a poor countryside. As a result thousands of their horses died including horses used for transport and thus the capacity of the supply units decreased.

The second main problem became the quality of the roads from Wilna onward that had not been taken into account by Napoleon. The bad roads turned into mud and further decreased the speed of the supply trains. As the speed of the supply trains had to be higher than that of the marching army, the transport from Wilna to the advancing troops nearly collapsed because of the bad roads and the decreasing number of horses.

The third main problem was that soldiers became ill with waterborne diseases like dysentery because the French soldiers drank every available water from the dirty streets and had no brandy left to purify it as the supply trains could not reach them fast enough. The increasing heat and the rapid marches required even more water for soldiers and horses.

==== Glaubokoe≈280,000 men ====
23 July 1812, 8th bulletin: The Russian army retreated after burning their supplies. The countryside was beautiful with extensive convents. Two of them contained 2,400 sick French soldiers.

The fourth main problem of Napoleon were the forage expeditions of his soldiers in need to survive without supply. These were perfectly suited for desertion and increased the losses of the Grande Armée even more.

==== Bechenkoviski≈220,000 men ====
25 July 1812, 9th bulletin: The French army was following the Russian army eastwards.

Foraging expeditions by the Grande Armee, and increasingly by deserters, intensified peasant hostility toward the army. The young, inexperienced conscripts were unaccustomed to living off the land, which has already been stripped by the retreating Russian army and then again by advance French troops such as the Guard. Many fell ill, deserted or starved.

==== Vitepsk≈190,000 men ====
31 July 1812, 10th bulletin: Vitepsk was occupied and magazines were provisioned and hospitals organised.

4 August 1812, 11th bulletin: The Grande Armée was sent by Napoleon into quarters of refreshment. The heat was excessive.

7 August 1812, 12th bulletin: Ten days of rest extremely helped the soldiers and their horses. The harvest was superb.

==== Smolenzk≈160,000 men ====
21 August 1812, 13th bulletin: The Russian army abandoned the burning Smolenzk and went on retreating eastwards.

23 August 1812, 14th bulletin: The heat was excessive. Smolenzk was made the third supply base surrounded by rich fields with great resources for food and forage. The Russians raised a militia of peasants badly armoured. The heat was excessive

==== Stawkovo≈140,000 men ====
27 August 1812, 15th bulletin: The Russian army, in retiring, burnt the bridges and destroyed the roads. The heat was extreme and it had not rained for a month.

As Barclay had lost the confidence of the Russian Emperor, the nobility, the army and the people by permanently retreating and not fighting the enemy, Mikhail Kutuzov was appointed Commander-in-chief of the Russian army. Kutuzov, 67 years old, would simply try to outlast Napoleon.

==== Viasma≈135,000 men ====
31 August 1812, 16th bulletin: A little rain had fallen and the weather was estimated to be good till 10 October 1812.

==== Gehatz≈130,000 men ====
3 September 1812, 17th bulletin: Food and water were no longer a problem.

Kutuzov officially searched a battleground eastwards as he was not allowed to retreat eastwards keeping in mind that his predecessor had been sacked for doing exactly that. The result was that the number of French soldiers still steadily decreased without a fight just by having to pursue the Russian army eastwards.

==== Mojaisk≈100,000 men ====
10 September 1812, 18th bulletin: After the lost Battle of Borodino the Russian army opened the road to Moscow for the Grande Armée.

As Kutuzov's army had lost but had not been destroyed he reported a victory and retreated into the south of Moscow near Tarutino after the council at Fili to wait for Napoleon's retreat. He increased the guerrilla warfare of the Cossacks and the people's war of the peasants slowly weakening the French army. His own army was reinforced with men, horses, weapons, ammunition, food, fodder and water, warm clothes and boots from the rich south of Moscow. The horses were forged caulkined shoes as usual in Russia.

==== Moscow≈100,000 men ====
16 September 1812, 19th bulletin: The Russian Governor Fyodor Rostopchin had sent off all the firemen with the fire engines and ordered on the 14 September to set fire to Moscow.

17 September 1812, 20th bulletin: A violent wind spread the fire very fast as 80% of the houses were built of wood. Immense well-stocked magazines were burnt, but most of the cellars were untouched by the fire. The French army was recovering from hunger, thirst and endless marches with an abundance of wine, brandy and food. There was not enough fodder for the horses and their number decreased. The temperature was that of autumn. The soldiers found a number of furs for the winter.

20 September 1812, 21st bulletin: After a couple of days, the fire subsided, but 75% of the city was burnt. The weather was rainy.

27 September 1812, 22nd bulletin: The first frosts appeared. The weather was similar to end of October in Paris. The French army was assured that the rivers would not be frozen over till the middle of November.

9 October 1812, 23rd bulletin: The sun felt warmer than in Paris.

14 October 1812, 24th bulletin: The weather was very fine. The first snow fell. The French army estimated that in 20 days winter-quarters should be reached

No organized supply of furs and heavy boots for every French soldier had been done. The Grande Armée did not forge caulkined shoes for all horses besides the experienced Polish cavalry to enable them to walk over roads that had become iced over.

The transport of the French wounded from Moscow to Smolenzk, Minsk, and Mohiloff started.

The guerrilla war of the Cossacks against the supply trains of the Grande Armée and the people's war against French foraging was intensified.

The peasants were taught that the French had burnt Moscow, their sacred city. In addition, Napoleon desecrated the churches by looting them in an organized way. The hatred of the Russian peasants increased even more.

==== Noilskoe≈90,000 men ====
20 October 1812, 25th bulletin: The army received orders to bake biscuit for twenty days and finally Napoleon left Moscow on the 19 October 1812. The Kremlin was mined to blow it up. The weather was very fine.

Russian prisoners not able to follow were shot, increasing the hatred of the Russian population even more.

==== Borosk≈90,000 men ====
23 October 1812, 26th bulletin: Napoleon ordered the destruction of the citadel and military establishment. The Grande Armée was now marching into the rich south of Moscow. The weather was extremely good.

Kutuzov and his Russian army was waiting on the way to Kaluga.

==== Vereya≈80,000 men ====
27 October 1812, 27th bulletin: For Russia it was the end of autumn. The Grande Armée won the Battle of Maloyaroslavets and in the night the Russian army retreated. But Napoleon decided to turn back from marching southwards and to walk northwestwards instead.

Napoleon created a strange detour on Minard's map. The detour enforced a delay of a couple of days until he reached the road to Smolenzk that his own Grande Armée had cleaned from anything useful on the way to Moscow. Because of the delay the food they had taken with them from Moscow was nearly used up.

==== Smolenzk≈40,000 men ====
11 November 1812, 28th bulletin: On the 7 November 1812 the Russian winter began covering the ground with snow. The roads became extremely slippery and dangerous for horses without caulkined shoes. Many soldiers without a fur, heavy boots and food but loaded with loot died of cold and fatigue and the standard night bivouac without a protecting tent became a death trap. The huts had been burnt to make fire. The Cossacks attacked nearly every small unit, even preventing on purpose the French army from sleeping.

The peasants killed a large number of groups of stragglers, sometimes in atrocious ways. A lot of French soldiers died by starvation as no supply was available and foraging was extremely dangerous because of the peasants and the large distances to be covered to find anything in the devastated landscape. As the French administration finally collapsed too, the French stragglers fought in Smolenzk for food and looted their own magazines, destroying more than gaining.

==== Maladzyechna≈5,000 men ====
3 December 1812, 29th bulletin: The cold increased a week later to 20 °C below the freezing point. The roads were covered with ice and more than 30,000 horses died. The Grande Armée abandoned and destroyed a great part of the cannon, ammunition, and provisions.

The Cossacks and peasants had killed or imprisoned unknown numbers of isolated persons. In Minard's map the detachments came back and increased the number of French soldiers for a short time. If these numbers are now correctly subtracted as at the beginning in Kowno, the correct number of remaining soldiers will be below 5,000. Napoleon's part of the Grande Armée had been annihilated by attrition warfare.

== Summary ==
=== Russia ===
Napoleonic Wars
The distance between Paris and Moscow is more than 2700 km. Time estimated to walk nonstop is 562 h. (Note: The figures are estimated with Google Maps)

Napoleon and his Grande Armée had been provisioning themselves by plundering both the land and its inhabitants as they advanced. This strategy was effective in the densely populated states of Germany, Italy, and Austria, whose agriculturally rich lands also contained a well developed network of paved roads, though this strategy was met with less success in the Peninsular War in Spain and Portugal. In the thinly populated areas of Russia the lack of food and water in combination with extreme temperatures and the Russians' scorched earth strategy led to a catastrophe that was ignored by Napoleon. The guerilla warfare of the Cossacks against supply trains implicitly led to the death of many soldiers and their horses as they were forced to eat and drink from contaminated sources, exposing thousands to disease. The feeding of great numbers of horses by supply trains was impossible at that time as a ration for a horse weighed about ten times as much as one for a man. The army was simply unable to raise the vast amount of supplies needed by foraging in the poor and devastated Russian countryside against a cruel people's war.

== Strategies against Napoleon ==
| Year | Russia | Prussia | Austria | France I | Napoleon | France II | Spain | Portugal | UK |
|---|---|---|---|---|---|---|---|---|---|
| 1805 | C3 | | C3 | C3 | C3 | | | | |
| 1806 | | C4 | | C4 | C4 | | | | |
| 1807 | C4 | | | C4 | C4 | PW | PW | PW | |
| 1808 | | | | | PW | PW | PW | PW | PW |
| 1809 | | | C5 | C5 | C5 | PW | PW | PW | PW |
| 1810 | | | | | | PW | PW | PW | PW |
| 1811 | | | | | | PW | PW | PW | PW |
| 1812 | RC | RC | RC | RC | RC | PW | PW | PW | PW |
| 1813 | C6 | C6 | C6 | C6 | C6 | PW | PW | PW | PW |
| 1814 | C6 | C6 | C6 | C6 | C6 | PW | PW | PW | PW |
| 1815 | | C7 | | C7 | C7 | C7 | | | C7 |

| XX | Under Napoleon's command |
| I, II | France's two-front war |
| XX | Napoleon personally involved |
| XX | Attrition Warfare against Napoleon |
| XX | Conventional Warfare against Napoleon |
| XX | Trachenberg Plan against Napoleon |
| C3 | War of the Third Coalition |
| C4 | War of the Fourth Coalition |
| C5 | War of the Fifth Coalition |
| C6 | War of the Sixth Coalition |
| C7 | War of the Seventh Coalition |
| PW | Peninsular War |
| RC | Russian Campaign |

== Civilian losses ==
=== Russia ===
Napoleon himself claimed in his memoirs that 100,000 Russian men, women and children died in the woods because of the fire of Moscow.

It was estimated that in total around half a million civilians were killed.

== See also ==
- List of Napoleonic battles
- Napoleonic Wars casualties
