= Yevgeni Ivanovich Markov =

- Евгений Иванович Марков
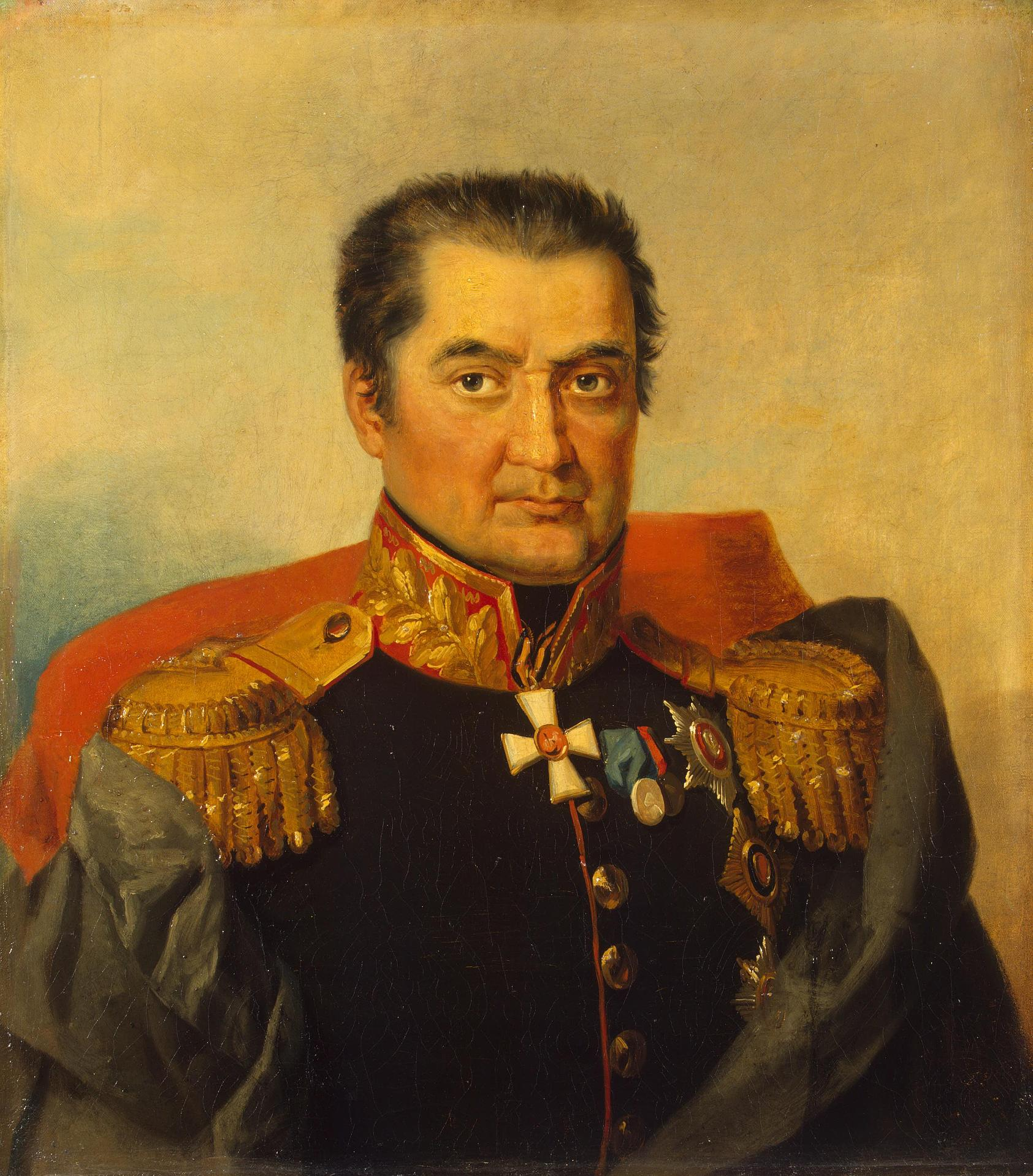
- by George Dawe; Military Gallery of the Winter Palace
- Born: 1769; Moscow, Russian Empire
- Died: 1828 (aged 58–59)
- Military career
- Allegiance: (Russian Empire)
- Branch: Infantry
- Service years: 1770 (1787) – 1814
- Rank: General Lieutenant
- Conflicts: French Revolutionary Wars; War of the Second Coalition; Second Battle of Zurich; Napoleonic Wars; War of the Fourth Coalition; Battle of Mohrungen; Russo-Turkish War (1806–1812); Battle of Slobozia
- Awards: Order of St. Alexander Nevsky, Order of St. Anna, Order of St. George, Order of St. Vladimir, Golden Weapon for Bravery.

Yevgeni Ivanovich Markov (Russian: Евгений Иванович Марков, romanized: Yevgény Ivánovich Márkov; 1769 in Moscow – 1828), was a Russian infantry commander during the French Revolutionary Wars and the Napoleonic Wars.

== Career ==
Born to a noble family in the Moscow Guberniya, Markov enlisted as a private in the Perm Infantry Regiment on 16 December 1770, and was made ensign on 29 November 1772. He began his active service in 1787. On 29 June 1788, he was promoted to second major, and participated in the Russo-Turkish War, serving under Alexander Suvorov commanding the 2nd line at Kinburn 13 October. He was awarded a golden cross and the Order of St. George (4th class) during the Siege of Ochakov on 11 April 1792, where he was wounded in the head. After recovery he was made a premier major in the Apsheron Infantry Regiment in 1792, serving in the Polish campaigns of 1792 and 1794 (see Polish–Russian War of 1792 and Kościuszko Uprising) and seeing action at Gorodische, Dubienka, and Praga. In 1796 he participated in the Persian Expedition. Promoted to colonel on 15 April 1798, he was given command of the Tiflis Musketeer Regiment on 27 August 1798. On 7 October 1798 he was promoted Major General, and appointed chief of the Murom Infantry Regiment on 8 December.

In 1799 he commanded a Brigade of Durasov's Division under Alexander Korsakov in Switzerland. At the Second Battle of Zurich on 25 September, he faced the initial French crossing of the Limmat, where he was grievously wounded and taken prisoner. Briefly retired from November 1799 to October 1800, he was appointed commandant of Arensborg on 8 February 1801.

=== 1807 Campaign ===
In January 1807 he commanded one of the three advance guards (right wing) under Bennigsen in Poland. On 24 January he surprised and defeated a detachment of Bernadotte’s Corps at Lipstadt (Liebstadt). With 14,000 men he clashed with Bernadotte again at Mohrungen 25th. Markov commanded a cavalry division at Eylau 7/8 February, and was commander of the right wing cavalry, March.

=== 1811 Service ===
In the second half of 1811 Markov fought under the command of Kutuzov in the Battle of Slobozia.

=== 1812 Service ===
In 1812 Markov was a General Lieutenant commanding the 10th Corps in Tormasov’s 3rd Army of the West 1812. He participated in Kobryn 27 July and Gorodetschna 12 August. Then he served under Chichagov, but was dismissed for incompetence, when it was found that despite his high-rank, his strategising characterised by such basic errors as confusing roads with rivers on maps.

In 1813 he served in Bennigsen's Army of Reserve, and saw action at the blockade of Hamburg.
