= Battle of Rusçuk =

1811 engagement of the Russo-Turkish War

- Part of the Rusçuk–Slobozia operation in the Russo-Turkish War (1806–1812)
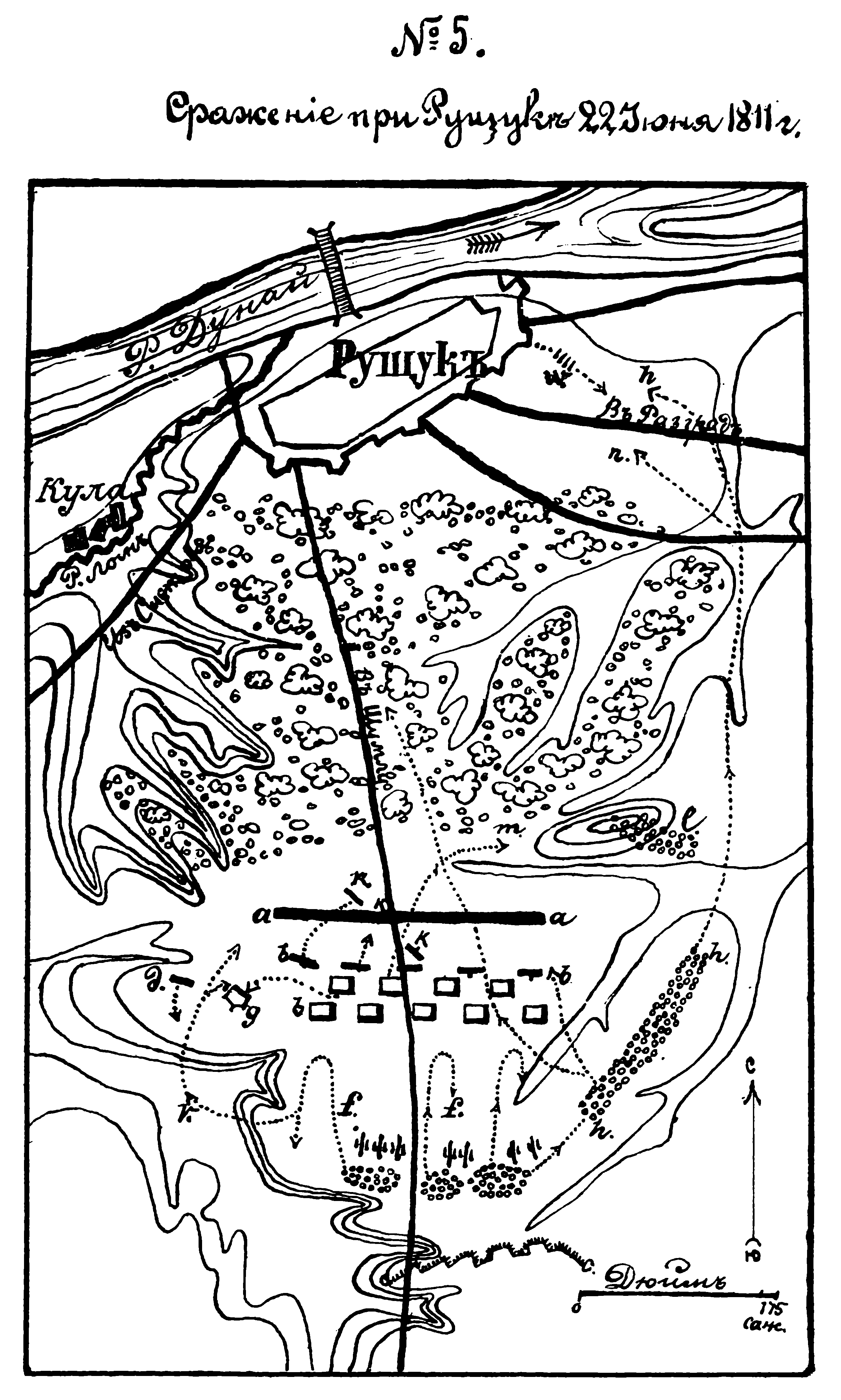
- Battleplan
Date	2 and 4 July (Note: Old Style: 20 and 22 June) 1811
Location	Ruse, Bulgaria
Result	Russian victory

Belligerents
Russian Empire	Ottoman Empire

Commanders and leaders
(Russian Empire) Mikhail Kutuzov	(Ottoman Empire) Laz Aziz Ahmed Pasha

Strength
15,000–20,000; ~50 cannon; perhaps 114 cannon in the whole Army of Moldavia	60,000; 78 cannon

Casualties and losses
500 to 800; 1 cannon	3,500; Prisoners' indications: 4,000; Russian sources: 5,000

The Battle of Rusçuk (Ruse) was fought on 2 and 4 July [O.S. 20 and 22 June] 1811 during the Rusçuk–Slobozia operation (4 July [O.S. 22 June] 1811 – 5 December [O.S. 23 November] 1811) within the Russo-Turkish War of 1806–1812. In it, General Mikhail Kutuzov's Russian troops defeated the Turkish troops of Vizier Laz Aziz Ahmed Pasha at the town of Ruse, then called Rusçuk.

== Prelude ==
In March 1811, with the threat of Napoleon's invasion of Russia, the government appointed Kutuzov commander-in-chief of the Army of Moldavia (45,000), setting before him the task of achieving victory over Turkey as quickly as possible.

== Actions ==
On July 2, in the morning fog, a stubborn battle broke out between the Russian outposts, the approaching 4 battalions and 5 squadrons, and the 5,000 attacking Turkish cavalry. It was thrown back.

At 7 o'clock in the morning of 4 July, Turkish cavalry and artillery began an attack along the entire front. Kutuzov later reported to Alexander that "the enemy's actions and movements were calculated so wisely that they could have brought glory to even the most skilled general." The diversionary attack on the right flank was contained and the center also remained unshaken, the left flank infantry squares of the Belostok and Olonets infantry regiments disciplinedly repelled the onslaught of 10,000 Anatolian cavalry, but the left flank cavalry from the Belorussian hussar and Kinburn dragoon regiments was crushed by the Anatolians, who entered the Russian rear.

The Turks then intended to encircle Kutuzov, seizing the Rusçuk fortress and destroying the bridge there in order to press Kutuzov to the Danube, but the latter foresaw this. The Rusçuk garrison made a sortie and drove back the cavalry that had occupied the heights on the Russian left flank, and, with the help of the 7th jaeger regiment it was driven back further to the vizier by the combined fire of infantry and artillery.

The vizier threw all his entrenching tools into the retrenchment (made by the Turks just in case, behind their positions) and retreated to the fortified camp covering his army by the whole mass of his cavalry, expecting an attack, but Kutuzov did not risk attacking those strong positions, taking only the retrenchment abandoned by the Turks.

== Postlude ==
Rusçuk prepared the conditions for the Ottoman defeat at the Battle of Slobozia, that put an end to the war.
