= Prozorovsky =

Russian noble family

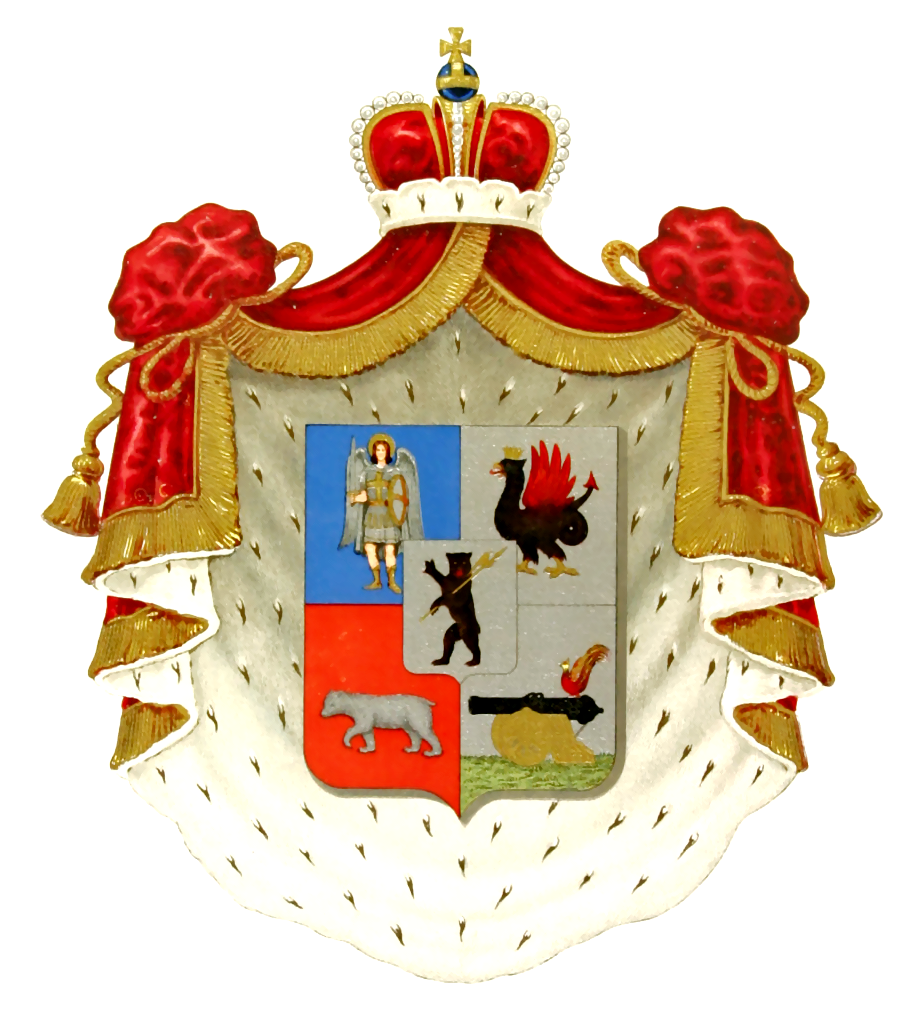
Coat of arms of Princes Prozorovsky

The House of Prozorovsky (Russian: Прозоровскиe) were a Russian noble family descending from medieval rulers of Yaroslavl and Mologa and eventually the Rostislavichi of Smolensk. Their name is derived from the village of Prozorovo near Mologa, which used to be their only votchina in the 15th century.

== History ==
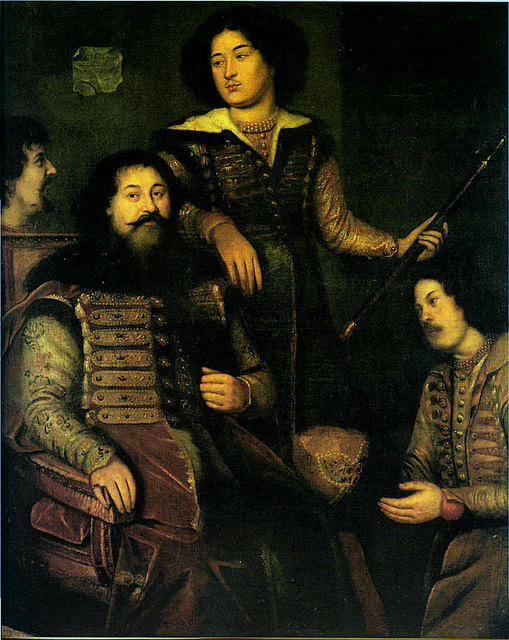
The Prozorovsky embassy in London, 1662

During the Muscovite period of Russian history, the most eminent member of the family was Prince Ivan Semyonovich Prozorovsky, a boyar's son and boyar himself, who happened to govern Astrakhan at the time of Stenka Razin's uprising. When the rebels took the city, they had him defenestrated from a kremlin tower. His little son was hung upside down on the city wall (1670). Ivan's inglorious death only added to the family standing, and six of his nephews became boyars during the early reign of Peter the Great.

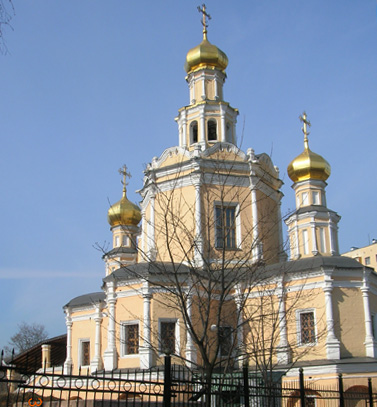
Church of Sts. Boris and Gleb was built by the Prozorovskys in their summer estate of Zyuzino near Moscow in 1688–1704.

Prince Ivan Andreyevich Prozorovsky, an Elizabethan general-in-chief, helped launch the military career of his son-in-law, Alexander Suvorov. The latter's life with Princess Daria Prozorovskaya was never peaceful. They separated early, and the Generalissimo never recognized her son Arkady Suvorov as his own.

Prince Alexander Alexandrovich Prozorovsky (1732-1809) was the only Field Marshal from the family. He gained distinction in the Seven Years' War and the conquest of Crimea. In 1790 he returned to the active service as the Governor General of Moscow. When the Russian army resumed its hostilities against Turkey in 1808, Prozorovsky became its Commander-in-Chief.

In 1870, the Prozorovsky family became extinct in a male line. 16 years earlier, Emperor Nicholas I had authorized Prince Alexander Fyodorovich Galitzine (1810–98) to take the name and arms of his maternal grandfather, Field-Marshal Alexander Prozorovsky. Galitzine's line became extinct in 1914, with the death of his only son, Prince Alexander Galitzine-Prozorovsky (1853-1914).
