= Siege of Brăila (1809) =

Event during the Russo-Turkish War (1806–1812)

- Part of Russo-Turkish War (1806–1812)
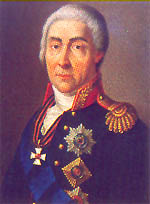
- Russian commander General Alexander Prozorovsky
Date	20 April – 2 May 1809
Location	Brăila (modern-day Brăila, Romania)
Result	Ottoman victory

Belligerents
Russian Empire	Ottoman Empire

Commanders and leaders
(Russian Empire) Alexander Prozorovsky (Russian Empire) Mikhail Kutuzov	(Ottoman Empire) Erzurumlu Seyyid Abdurrahman Pasha (Ottoman Empire) Pehlivan Ibrahim Agha

Strength
25,000–30,000 troops	12,000 troops

Casualties and losses
3,000–5,000 killed 2,000–4,000 wounded 20 cannons captured	Light

The Siege of Brăila was a significant event during the Russo-Turkish War (1806–1812). Between 20 April and 2 May 1809, the city of Brăila (present-day Brăila, Romania) was besieged by Russian forces under the command of Generals Alexander Prozorovsky and Mikhail Kutuzov. The siege ended in a decisive Ottoman victory, as the defending garrison successfully repelled the Russian attack.

== Background ==
In mid-April 1809, Russian commanders Alexander Prozorovsky and Mikhail Kutuzov gathered the Russian army in Martinești on 17 April. On 20 April, they marched towards Brăila and established their camp approximately 4 kilometers from the fortress, despite being weakened by heat and lack of water. The Russians launched attacks on the Ottoman forward posts and commenced the siege.

The Ottoman garrison was commanded by Erzurumlu Seyyid Abdurrahman Pasha, who had called for support from Pehlivan Ibrahim Agha, the hero of the Siege of Ismail (1806–1807). The garrison eventually numbered 12,000 men. They fortified the defenses with double ditches and trenches, and installed numerous artillery batteries.

When Prozorovsky's demand for surrender was rejected by the Ottoman side, the Russians tightened the siege and constructed both heavy and light artillery batteries about 650–750 meters from the Ottoman fortifications.

== The Assault ==
The Russian assault began on the evening of 1 May with three tactical columns. At 7:30 AM on 2 May, an additional Russian force joined the attack. However, the assault failed due to ineffective Russian artillery and the premature firing of signal rockets, which prevented a successful night attack.

The fighting lasted more than eight hours, during which the Russian forces suffered heavy losses. A sortie by Ottoman forces under Laz Ahmed Agha further increased Russian casualties. General Prozorovsky retreated in haste, leaving behind 20 cannons and suffering between 3,000 to 5,000 dead and 2,000 to 4,000 wounded.

== See also ==
- Siege of Izmail (1807)
- Russo-Turkish War (1806–1812)
