= Laz Aziz Ahmed Pasha =

Grand Vizier of the Ottoman Empire from 1811 to 1812

- Died: March 1819; Erzerum, Ottoman Empire
- Military career
- Allegiance: Ottoman Empire
- Rank: Grand Vizier
- Conflicts: Russo-Turkish War (1806–1812); Siege of Brăila (1809); Siege of Şumnu (1810); Battle of Rusçuk; Battle of Slobozia

Laz Aziz Ahmed Pasha (Turkish: Laz Aziz Ahmet Paşa; Laz: ლაზი აზიზ აჰმედ-ფაშა, Lazi Aziz Ahmed-Paşa; died March 1819, Erzurum) was an Ottoman statesman of ethnic Laz origin. He was the Grand Vizier of the Ottoman Empire.

== Biography ==
In his youth, Ahmed Pasha served as a janissary and soon was given the title of Kapıcıbaşı. Later he became governor of Brăila, where while in this post, he successfully repelled a siege by Russian troops. He also conducted sorties during the Siege of Şumnu. During the Russo-Turkish War (1806–1812) he was sent to Edirne to coordinate the ottoman troops. After winning some early victories, Ahmed Pasha was elevated to the office of Grand vizier, having removed the old Yusuf Pasha. On July 9, 1811 he recaptured Rusçuk from the Russians. However, the campaign in 1811 ended with his army's defeat and surrender at the Battle of Slobozia, though Ahmed Pasha himself managed to evade capture by escaping from his camp at night. After the signing of the Treaty of Bucharest on May 28, 1812, he was accused by Hurshid Pasha of being incompetent and soon was dismissed. On September 5, 1812, he was replaced by Hurshid Pasha.

After his dismissal, he was sent to Bursa, then pardoned and appointed governor of Anatolia in 1814, Aleppo in September 1816, and later Erzurum. He died in March 1819 while serving as governor of Erzurum.

== See also ==
- List of Ottoman grand viziers

== Sources ==
- Buz, Ayhan (2009) "Osmanlı Sadrazamları", İstanbul: Neden Kitap, ISBN 978-975-254-278-5
- Danişmend, İsmail Hâmi (1971), Osmanlı Devlet Erkânı, İstanbul: Türkiye Yayınevi.
- Tektaş, Nazim (2002), Sadrâzamlar Osmanlı'da İkinci Adam Saltanatı, İstanbul: Çatı Yayınevi.

Political offices
Preceded by Kör Yusuf Ziyaüddin Pasha	Grand Vizier of the Ottoman Empire; 1811–1812	Succeeded by Hurshid Pasha
