= Alexander Prozorovsky =

Russian noble (1733–1809)

Prince Alexander Alexandrovich Prozorovsky
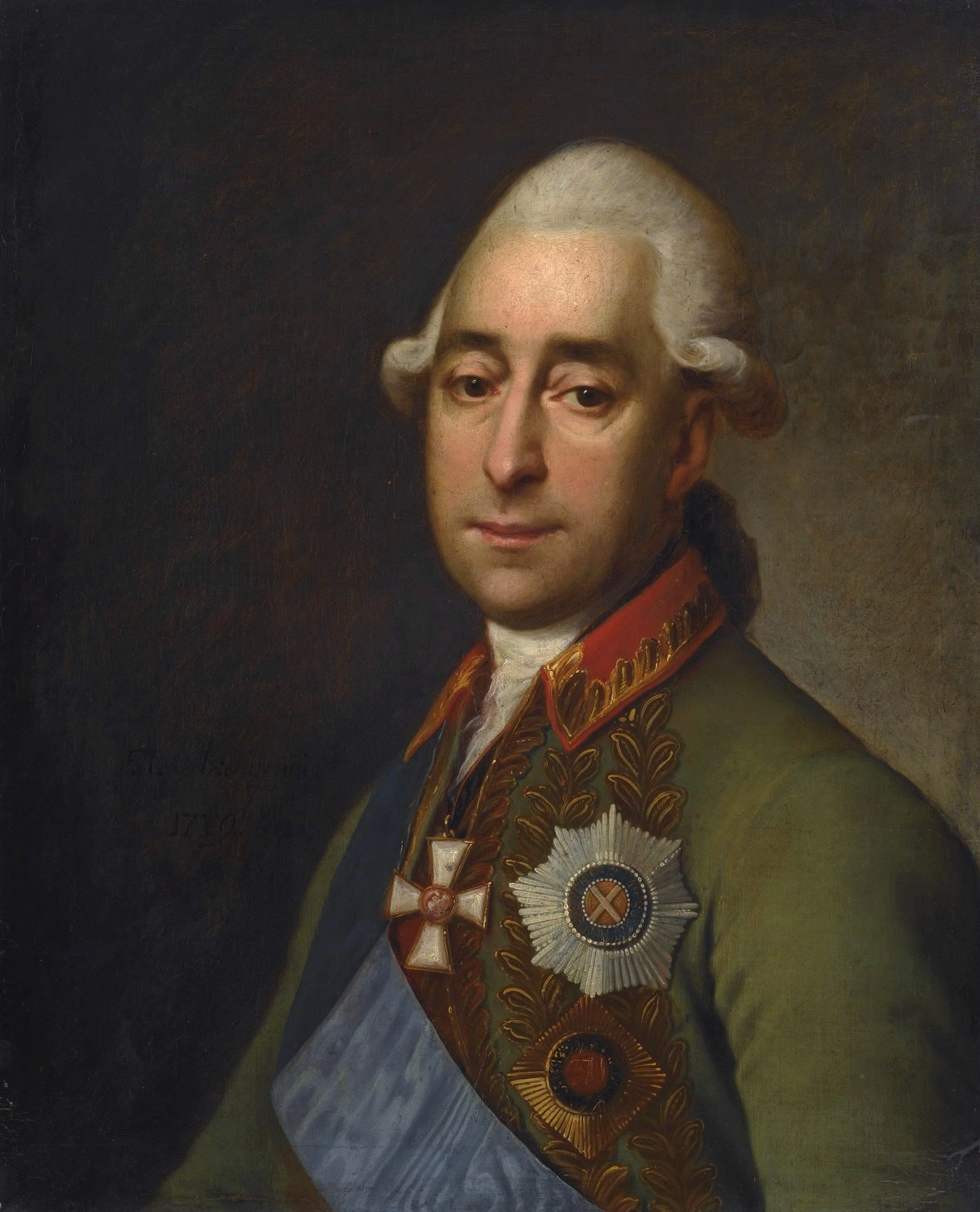
- Portrait by Dmitry Levitzky, 1779
- Born: 1733; Russian Empire
- Died: 21 August 1809 (aged 75–76)
- Relatives: House of Prozorovsky
- Military career
- Allegiance: Russian Empire
- Branch: Imperial Russian Army
- Service years: 1742–1784; 1790–1809
- Rank: Field Marshal
- Conflicts: Seven Years' War; War of the Bar Confederation; Russo-Turkish War (1768–74); Russo-Turkish War (1806–12)
- Awards: Order of St. Andrew; Order of St. George; Order of St. Vladimir

Prince Alexander Alexandrovich Prozorovsky (Russian: Алекса́ндр Алекса́ндрович Прозоро́вский, tr. Aleksándr Aleksándrovič Prozoróvskij; 1733–1809) was an Imperial Russian field marshal who distinguished himself during the Seven Years' War and the conquest of Crimea. He belonged to the Prozorovsky boyar family.

== Biography ==
Prozorovsky gained distinction in the Seven Years' War and the conquest of Crimea. Prozorovsky's career was furthered by his maternal Galitzine relatives, who helped him to get appointed to the office of governor of Kursk in 1780. He resigned two years later and spent the following years at his country estates.

In 1790 Prozorovsky returned to the active service as the Governor General of Moscow. Emperor Paul I, however, could not get along with him and discharged him from his office. Prozorovsky's ancient services were recalled in 1808, when the Russian Army resumed its hostilities against Turkey, and Prozorovsky became its commander-in-chief.

Prozorovsky's reputation suffered a blow when his attempt to storm of Brailov ended in his army being repelled at enormous loss of Russian lives life. The old and ailing general asked Emperor Alexander I to dispatch the younger and more energetic Mikhail Kutuzov to his aid.

Two months later, when Prozorovsky's army was crossing the Danube, the field marshal died. His body was transported to Kiev and interred in the Pecherskaya Lavra.
