= 14th Olonets Infantry Regiment =

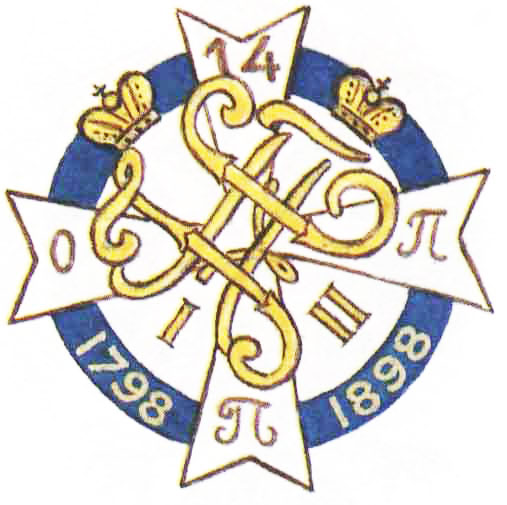
- Active: 1798–1918
- Country: Russian Empire
- Branch: (Russian Empire) Russian Imperial Army
- Role: Infantry
- Engagements: Russo-Turkish War (1806-1812); French invasion of Russia; War of the Sixth Coalition; Russo-Turkish War (1828-1829); November Uprising; Hungarian Revolution of 1848; Crimean War; January Uprising

The 14th Olonets Infantry Regiment was an infantry regiment of the Russian Empire's Imperial Russian Army. It took part in wars against the Ottoman Empire and the First French Empire (1813–1814), as well as conflicts in Poland (1831 and 1863), Hungary (1849) and the Crimea.
