= Russo-Turkish War (1806–1812) =

Eighth conflict of the Russo-Turkish wars

- Part of the Russo-Turkish wars and Napoleonic Wars
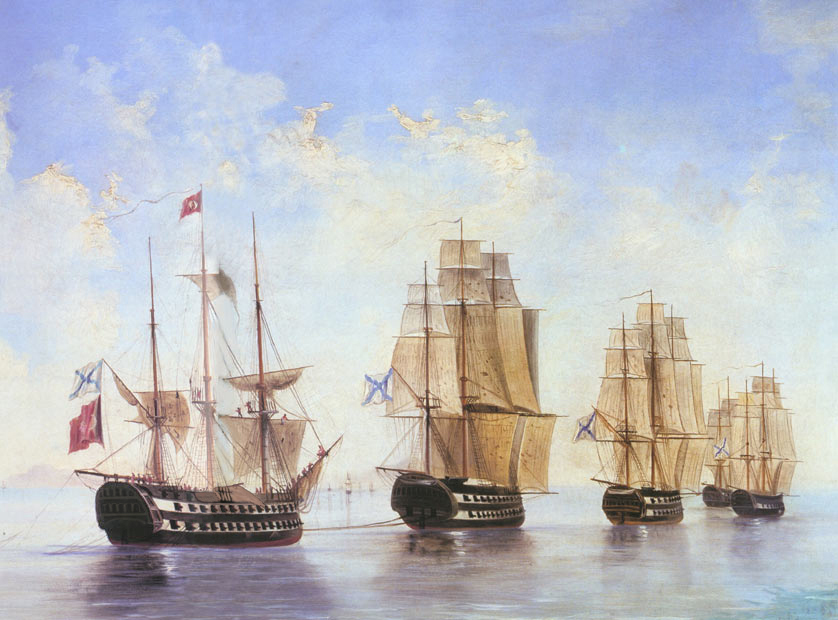
- Russian Fleet after the Battle of Athos by Alexey Bogolyubov
Date	22 December 1806 – 28 May 1812
Location	Moldavia, Wallachia, Armenia, Caucasus, and the Dardanelles
Result	See § Aftermath
Territorial changes	Russia annexes the eastern half of Moldavia, which became known as Bessarabia

Belligerents
Russian Empire; Principality of Mingrelia; Principality of Guria; Principality of Abkhazia; Moldavia; Wallachia; Revolutionary Serbia; Prince-Bishopric of Montenegro	Ottoman Empire; Budjak Horde (1806–1807)

Commanders and leaders
(Russian Empire) Alexander I; (Russian Empire) Alexander Prozorovsky #; (Russian Empire) Pyotr Bagration; (Russian Empire) Giorgio Giovanni Zuccato †; (Russian Empire) Nikolay Kamensky; (Russian Empire) Mikhail Kutuzov; (Russian Empire) Dmitry Senyavin; (Russian Empire) Mikhail Miloradovich; (Russian Empire) Ivan Gudovich	(Ottoman Empire) Selim III (executed) (Ottoman Empire) Mustafa IV (executed) (Ottoman Empire) Mahmud II (Ottoman Empire) Yusuf Ziya Pasha (Ottoman Empire) Seydi Ali Pasha (Ottoman Empire) Ağa Hüseyin Paşa (Ottoman Empire) Koca Hüsrev Pasha (Ottoman Empire) Aziz Ahmed Pasha (Ottoman Empire) Ibrahim Hilmi Pasha

Casualties and losses
(Russian Empire) 70,000 killed	(Ottoman Empire) 100,000 killed
- 225,000 deaths

The Russo-Turkish War (1806–1812) was fought between the Russian Empire and the Ottoman Empire as one of 12 Russo-Turkish wars. In 1812, both sides favored peace just as Napoleon's invasion of Russia was about to commence.

== Background ==
The war broke out against the background of the Napoleonic Wars. In 1806, Sultan Selim III of Ottoman Empire, encouraged by the Russian defeat at Austerlitz and advised by the French Empire, deposed the pro-Russian Constantine Ypsilantis as Hospodar of the Principality of Wallachia and Alexander Mourousis as Hospodar of Moldavia, both Ottoman vassal states. Simultaneously, the French Empire occupied Dalmatia and threatened to penetrate the Danubian Principalities at any time. In order to safeguard the Russian border against a possible French attack, a 40,000-strong Russian contingent advanced into Moldavia and Wallachia. The Sultan reacted by blocking the Dardanelles to Russian ships and declared war on Russia.

== Early hostilities ==
Initially, Emperor Alexander I was reluctant to concentrate large forces against the Ottoman Empire while his relations with Napoleonic France were still uncertain and the main part of his army was occupied fighting against Napoleon in Prussia. A massive Ottoman offensive aimed at Russian-occupied Bucharest, the Wallachian capital, was promptly checked at Obilesti by as few as 4,500 soldiers commanded by Mikhail Miloradovich (June 2, 1807). In Armenia, the 7,000-strong contingent of Count Ivan Gudovich destroyed the Turkish force of 20,000 at Arpachai (June 18). In the meantime, the Russian Imperial Navy under Dmitry Senyavin blockaded the Dardanelles and defeated the Ottoman fleet in the Battle of the Dardanelles, after which Selim III was deposed. The Ottoman fleet was destroyed the following month in the Battle of Athos, thus establishing Russian supremacy at sea.

== Campaigns of 1808–10 ==
At this point the war might have ended, if it were not for the Peace of Tilsit. The Russian Emperor, constrained by Napoleon to sign an armistice with the Turks, used the time of peace to transfer more Russian soldiers from Prussia to Bessarabia. After the southern army was augmented to 80,000 and the hostilities were resumed, the 76-year-old commander-in-chief Alexander Prozorovsky made little progress in more than a year. In August 1809 he was eventually succeeded by Prince Pyotr Bagration, who promptly crossed the Danube and overran Dobruja. Bagration proceeded to lay siege to Silistra, at the village of Tataritsa, the army of the Ottoman pasha attacked it, the Russians repulsed the attacks, but could not capture the Turkish trenches, and upon learning of the arrival of reinforcements, they lifted the siege and retreated.

In 1810, the hostilities were renewed by the brothers Nikolay and Sergei Kamensky, who defeated the Ottoman reinforcement heading for Silistra and ousted the Turks from Hacıoğlu Pazarcık (May 22). The position of Silistra now appeared hopeless, and the garrison surrendered on May 30. Ten days later, Kamensky laid siege to another strong fortress, Shumla (or Schumen). His storm of the citadel was repelled at great loss of life, and more bloodshed ensued during the storming of the Danubian port of Rousse (or Rustchuk) on July 22. The latter fortress did not fall to the Russians until 9 September, after Kamensky's army had surprised and routed a huge Turkish detachment at Batin on August 26. On October 26, Kamensky again defeated a 40,000-strong army of Osman Pasha at Vidin. The Russians lost only 1,500 men, compared with 10,000 for their opponents.

However, the young Nikolay Kamensky caught a serious illness on February 4, 1811 and died soon thereafter, left the army under the command of Louis Alexandre Andrault de Langeron. To this point, although the Russians had won many battles, they had failed to achieve any important victories that would force the Ottomans to end the war. Furthermore, the relationship between France and Russia quickly became strained, pointing to the inevitable renewal of hostilities between the countries. The Russian Empire found that she needed to end the southern war quickly in order to concentrate on dealing with Napoleon. In such a situation, Tsar Alexander appointed his disfavoured general Mikhail Kutuzov to be the new commander of the Russian force.

Alexander might not like Kutuzov, but he needed Kutuzov's intelligence, his talent and his prestige in the Army, where he was thought to be the direct successor of Suvorov.

— E. Tarle

== Kutuzov's campaign (1811) ==
Kutuzov's first action upon taking command was to reduce the size of the garrisons in the fortresses along the Danube and retreat back into Wallachia. The Russian withdrawal induced the Turks to launch a counter-offensive to recapture lost territory. In the spring of 1811, 60,000 Turkish troops led by Grand Vizier Ahmed Pasha gathered at Šumnu, the strongest fortress in Ottoman Bulgaria and set out on a campaign to confront Kutuzov's army. Kutuzov's army was also large with 46,000 soldiers, however, he was responsible for protecting the full 600 mile Danube River border between Wallachia and Ottoman Bulgaria.

On 22 June 1811, the two forces met in battle of Rusçuk on the Danube. After a long struggle, the Russians successfully repelled Ahmed Pasha's larger army. A few days later as the Turks were preparing to attack the Russians in the Rusçuk fortress, Kutuzov ordered his forces to cross the Danube and retreat back into Wallachia.

Believing that the Russians were trying to escape, Ahmed Pasha decided to launch an attack. On 28 August, 36,000 Turkish troops began to cross the Danube River to assault the Russians. The Turkish force established a fortified bridgehead on the left bank of the river near the small village of Slobozia where they were quickly surrounded by two divisions of Kutuzov's army. The remaining 20,000 men of Ahmed Pasha's army remained at the Turkish field camp on the right bank near Rusçuk where they guarded the munitions and supplies. On the night of 1 October 1811, however, a Russian detachment of 7,500 men secretly crossed the Danube. In the morning the Russians overwhelmed the Turkish troops in a surprise attack. The Turks panicked and scattered, suffering 2,000 casualties. Thereafter, the Russian forces completely enveloped the Turkish bridgehead on the left bank of the Danube and initiated an all-out artillery attack.

For approximately six weeks, the Russians besieged and bombarded the Turkish bridgehead. Surrounded with their supply lines cut, the Turks suffered not only from a persistent Russian bombardment but also from malnutrition and disease. A ceasefire was agreed upon on 25 October and approximately three weeks later on 14 November 1811, Ahmed Pasha agreed to a truce and formally surrendered to Kutuzov. The magnitude of the Turkish defeat with 36,000 casualties, ended the war along the Danube and led to peace negotiations ultimately resulting in the signing of the Treaty of Bucharest on 28 May 1812.

== Caucasus front ==
Russo-Turkish War 1806-1812
Blue=Russian Georgia
Yellow=Khanates taken from Persia before the war
Black Diamond=Persian
Red=Turkish

Six years of war on the eastern front left the border unchanged. Fighting here was more serious than during the Russo-Turkish War of 1787–1792, but it was still a sideshow to the main action. Russia crossed the Caucasus and annexed Georgia, the western half of which had been nominally Turkish. It also had taken the Persian vassal khanates along the Caspian coast and east of Georgia. The area around modern Armenia (Erivan Khanate and Nakhichevan Khanate) was still under Persian control. Russia was also at war with Persia but the Turks and Persians did not help each other. A large part of the Russian army was also tied up in Europe because of Napoleon's threat in the west. The Russian Viceroys were 1806: Ivan Gudovich, 1809: Alexander Tormasov, 1811: Filippo Paulucci, 1812: Nikolay Rtishchev.

Fighting with Turkey began in 1807 with the swift seizure of Anapa by Admiral Pustoshkin. Gudovich led his main force toward Akhaltsikhe but lost 900 men while trying to storm Akhalkalaki and withdrew to Georgia. Secondary campaigns against Kars and Poti also failed. The Turks took the offensive, failed three times to take Gyumri and then were completely defeated by Gudovich (Battle of Arpachai). He was congratulated by the Shah, an interesting comment on the relations between the two Muslim empires. Gudovich was replaced by Count Tormasov who arrived about April 1809. In 1810 Poti on the coast was captured. A Turkish invasion was blocked by General Paulucci under the walls of Akhalkalaki. In November 1810 a Russian attack on Akhaltsikhe failed due to an outbreak of plague. In 1811 Tormasov was recalled at his own request and replaced by Paulucci in Transcaucasia, Rtishchev taking over the Northern Line. In 1811 more troops were withdrawn to deal with the expected threat of Napoleon. Turks and Persians agreed on a joint attack toward Gyumri. They met at ’Magasberd’ {location?} on 30Aug11. There a Kurd assassinated the Serasker of Erzurum and this caused the forces to break up.

Paulucci sent Pyotr Kotlyarevsky against Akhalkalaki. He made a forced march over the snow-covered mountains, avoiding the main roads, attacked at night, and had storming parties on the walls before the Turks knew the Russians were there. By the morning of 10 December he held the fort with a loss of only 30 killed and wounded. For this he was promoted to major-general at the age of 29. On 21 February 1812 5000 Turks failed to re-take Akhalkalaki. Three days later they were defeated at Parghita {location?}. Paulucci was sent west to command troops against Napoleon, and Rtishchev became commander of forces on both sides of the Caucasus mountains.

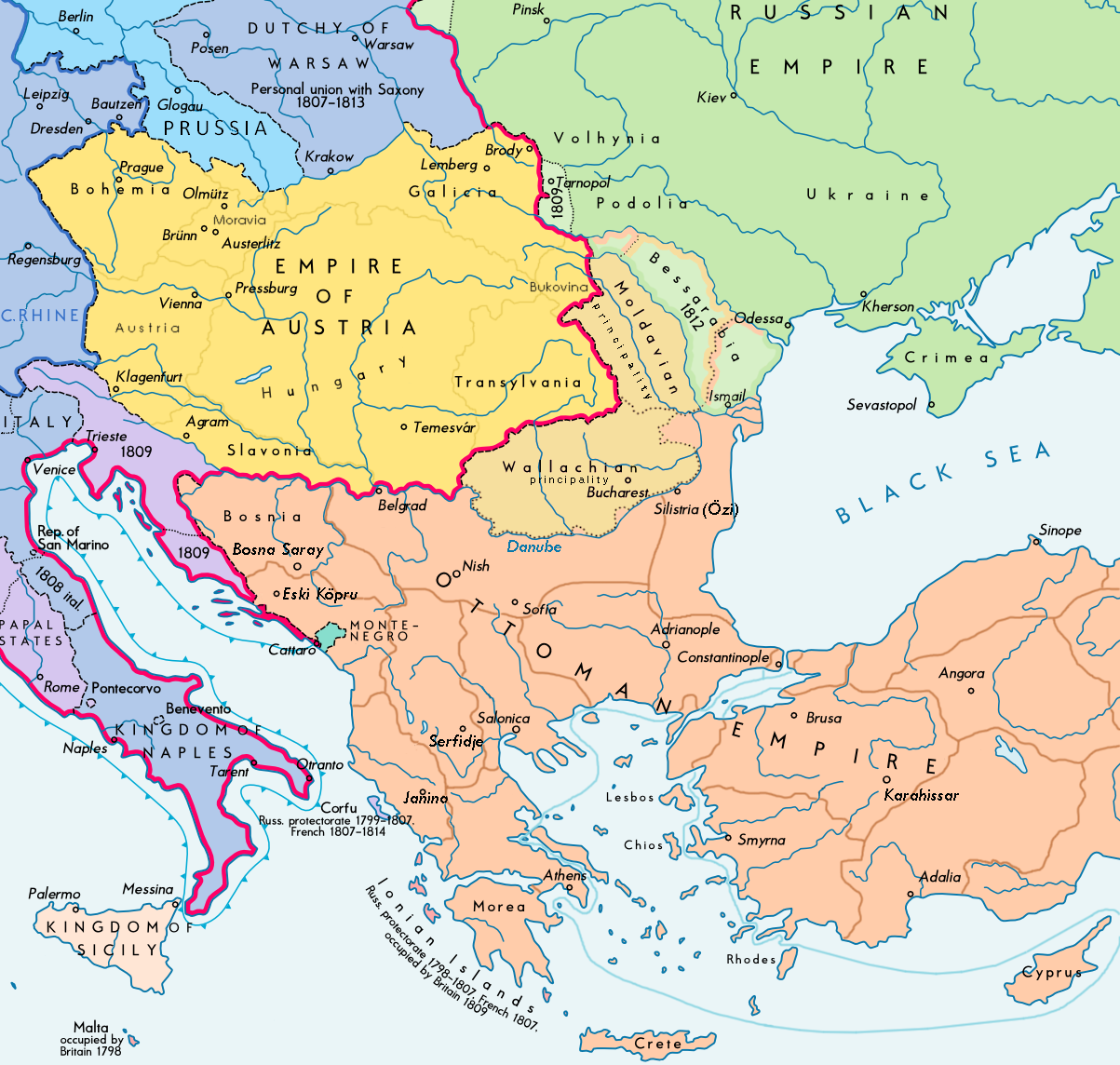
Southeast Europe after the Treaty of Bucharest

Russia decided to make peace, which was signed by the Treaty of Bucharest (1812).

== Aftermath ==
Although there are sources that describe the war as a Russian victory. there are some that call it indecisive, because the treaty, favourable to the Ottomans, stipulated that Russia returned all occupied lands other than Bessarabia.

According to the Treaty, the Ottoman Empire ceded the eastern half of Moldavia to Russia (which renamed the territory to Bessarabia), specifically, the territories east of Danube and Prut rivers, even though the Ottoman Empire had committed to protecting that region. Russia became a new power in the lower Danube area, and had an economically, diplomatically, and militarily profitable frontier.

In Transcaucasia, Turkey regained nearly all it had lost in the east: Poti, Anapa and Akhalkalali. Russia retained Sukhum-Kale on the Abkhazian coast. In return, the Sultan accepted the Russian annexation of the Kingdom of Imereti, in 1810.

The treaty was approved by Alexander I of Russia on June 11, some 13 days before Napoleon's invasion of Russia began. The commanders were able to get many of the Russian soldiers in the Balkans back to the western areas before the expected attack of Napoleon.

== See also ==
- First Serbian Uprising

== Bibliography ==
- Aksan, Virginia (2013). Ottoman Wars, 1700–1870: An Empire Besieged. Routledge.
- Allen, William Edward David; Muratoff, Paul (2010). Caucasian Battlefields: A History of the Wars on the Turco-Caucasian Border, 1828–1921. Cambridge University Press. ISBN 978-1108013352.
- Baddeley, John F. (1908). Russian Conquest of the Caucasus.
- Coene, Frederik (2010). The Caucasus – An Introduction. Routledge. ISBN 978-0415666831.
- Kamenir, Victor (2017). "Sideshow on the Danube". HistoryNet. Historynet LLC.
- Hille, Charlotte (2010). State Building and Conflict Resolution in the Caucasus. Brill.
- Ismail, F. (1979). "The Making of the Treaty of Bucharest, 1811–1812". Middle Eastern Studies. 15 (2): 163–192. doi:10.1080/00263207908700404.
- Mikhailovskii-Danilevskii, Alexander (2002). Mikaberidze, Alexander (ed.). Russian-Turkish War of 1806–1812 (Volume 1–2 ed.). West Chester: Nafziger Collection.
- Petrov, A.H. (1885–1887). The War between Russia and Turkey, 1806–1812 (Volume 1–3 Spb ed.).
- "Slobodze Battle 1811". Great Russian Encyclopedia (in Russian). 2017.
- Williams, Henry Smith (1907). The Historians' History of the World: A Comprehensive Narrative of the Rise and Development of Nations as Recorded by Over Two Thousand of the Great Writers of All Ages. London: The History Association.
- Petrov, Andrei N. (1887). Война России с Турцией, 1806-1812 [Russia's war with Turkey of 1806-1812] (in Russian). Vol. 3: 1810, 1811 and 1812. Saint-Petersburg: Voenaya topographia.
- Sokolov, Oleg V. (2020). Битва двух империй. 1805-1812 [The Battle of two Empires, 1805-1812]. Лучшие воины в истории (Best warriors in history) (in Russian). Moscow: Яуза. ISBN 978-5-00155-152-2.
