= Helen Mirren on screen and stage =

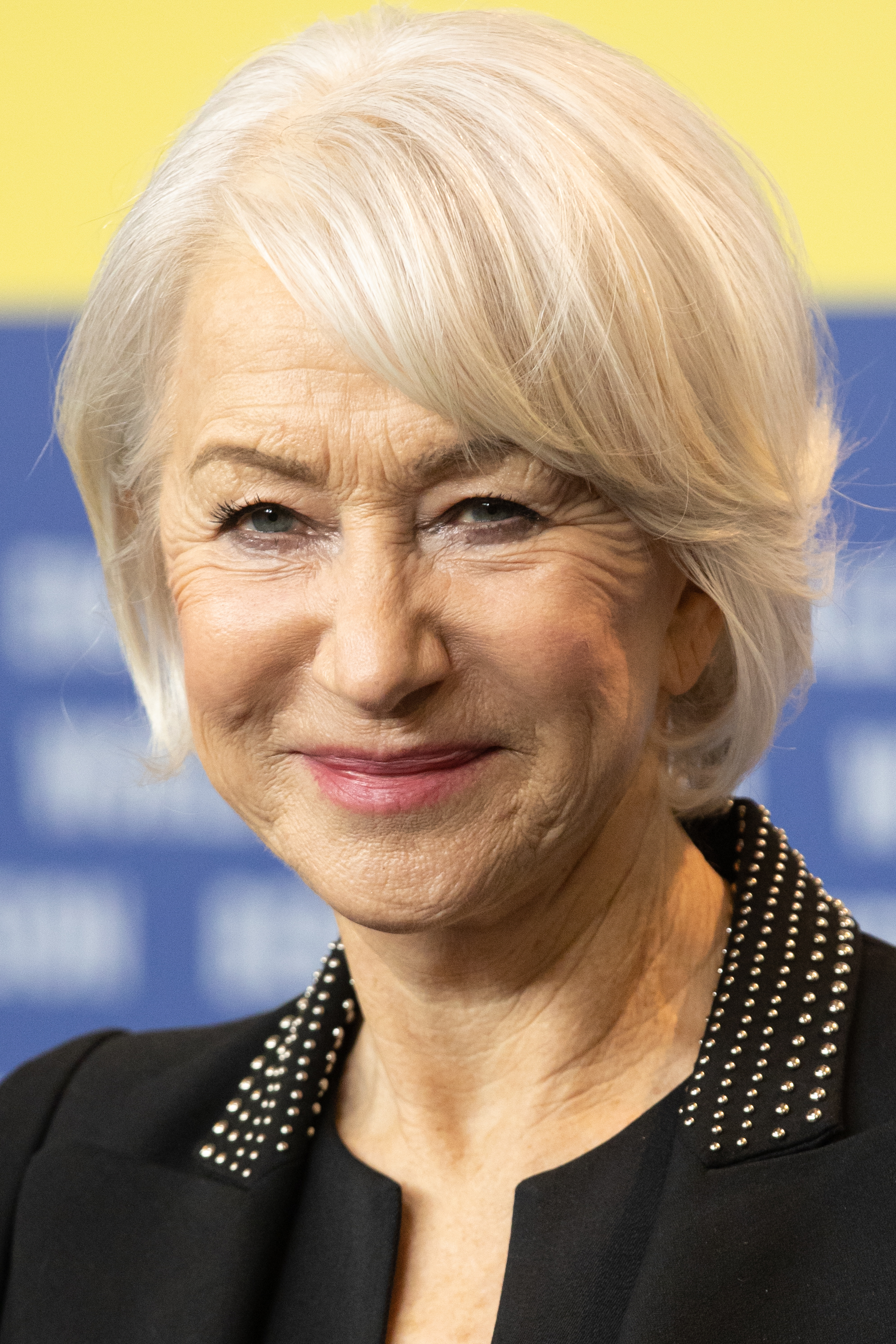
Mirren at the 2020 Berlin International Film Festival

Dame Helen Mirren is an English actor known for her prolific career in film, television, and on stage taking roles both dramatic and comedic. She has received several honors including an Academy Award, four BAFTA Awards, five Emmy Awards, three Golden Globe Awards, and a Tony Award.

Mirren started her career on stage playing Cleopatra in Antony and Cleopatra in a 1965 production with the National Youth Theatre at The Old Vic. She acted with both the Royal Shakespeare Company and the Royal National Theatre acting in numerous productions of William Shakespeare's work including The Merchant of Venice (1967), Much Ado About Nothing (1968), Richard III (1970), Hamlet (1970), and Macbeth (1974). She made her Broadway debut acting in the revival of the Ivan Turgenev play A Month in the Country (1995). She portrayed Queen Elizabeth II in the Peter Morgan play The Audience both on Broadway and on the West End, which earned her the Tony Award for Best Actress in a Play and the Laurence Olivier Award for Best Actress.

Mirren made her film debut in the British experimental film Herostratus (1967). She took early roles in Caligula (1979), The Long Good Friday (1980), Excalibur (1981), and The Cook, the Thief, His Wife & Her Lover (1989). She received the Academy Award for Best Actress for her portrayal of Queen Elizabeth II in the drama The Queen (2006). She was Oscar-nominated playing Queen Charlotte in The Madness of King George (1994), a housekeeper in Gosford Park (2001), and Sofya Tolstoy in The Last Station (2009). During this time she acted in numerous films across genres in films such as Calendar Girls (2003), State of Play (2009), The Tempest (2010), The Debt (2010), Woman in Gold (2015), Eye in the Sky (2015), Trumbo (2015), The Leisure Seeker (2017), and Golda (2023).

On television, Mirren earned acclaim for her role as DCI Jane Tennison in the police procedural Prime Suspect (1991–2006), for which she earned three BAFTA Awards and two Primetime Emmy Awards. She also earned Emmy Awards for her roles as Ayn Rand in the Showtime television film The Passion of Ayn Rand (1999) and Queen Elizabeth I in the HBO miniseries Elizabeth I (2005) She also acted in the TNT film Door to Door (2002), the HBO movie Phil Spector (2013), the HBO miniseries Catherine the Great (2019), and the Paramount+ Western series 1923 (2022).

== Film ==
Key
†	Denotes works that have not yet been released

Year	Title	Role	Notes
1966	Press for Time	Penelope Squires	Uncredited
1967	Herostratus	Advert Woman	
1968	A Midsummer Night's Dream	Hermia	
1969	Age of Consent	Cora Ryan	
1970	Red Hot Shot	Unknown	
1972	Savage Messiah	Gosh Boyle	
1972	Miss Julie	Miss Julie	
1973	O Lucky Man!	Patricia	
1976	Hamlet	Ophelia/Gertrude	
1979	Caligula	Caesonia	
1980	Hussy	Beaty	
1980	The Fiendish Plot of Dr. Fu Manchu	Alice Rage	
1980	The Long Good Friday	Victoria	
1981	Excalibur	Morgana	
1984	Cal	Marcella	
1984	2010	Tanya Kirbuk	
1985	Heavenly Pursuits	Ruth Chancellor	
1985	Coming Through	Frieda von Richthofen Weekley	
1985	White Nights	Galina Ivanova	
1986	The Mosquito Coast	Mother Fox	
1988	Pascali's Island	Lydia Neuman	
1989	When the Whales Came	Clemmie Jenkins	
1989	The Cook, the Thief, His Wife & Her Lover	Georgina Spica	
1990	Bethune: The Making of a Hero	Frances Penny Bethune	
1990	A Story is Not Final II: The Second Chapter	Xanyides	
1990	The Comfort of Strangers	Caroline	
1991	Where Angels Fear to Tread	Lilia Herriton	
1993	The Hawk	Annie Marsh	
1993	Royal Deceit	Geruth	
1994	The Madness of King George	Queen Charlotte	
1994	Children of God	The Narrator (voice)	
1995	The Snow Queen	Snow Queen (voice)	
1996	Some Mother's Son	Kathleen Quigley	Also associate producer
1997	Critical Care	Stella	
1998	Sidoglio Smithee	Herself	
1998	The Prince of Egypt	Queen Tuya (voice)	
1999	Teaching Mrs. Tingle	Mrs. Eve Tingle	
2000	Greenfingers	Georgina Woodhouse	
2001	The Pledge	Doctor	
2001	No Such Thing	The Boss	
2001	Happy Birthday	Distinguished Woman	Also director
2001	Last Orders	Amy	
2001	Gosford Park	Mrs. Wilson	
2003	Calendar Girls	Chris Harper	
2004	The Clearing	Eileen Hayes	
2004	Raising Helen	Dominique	
2005	The Hitchhiker's Guide to the Galaxy	Deep Thought (voice)	
2005	Shadowboxer	Rose	
2006	The Queen	Elizabeth II	
2007	National Treasure: Book of Secrets	Emily Appleton	
2008	Inkheart	Elinor Loredan	
2009	State of Play	Cameron Lynne	
2009	The Last Station	Sofya Tolstoy	
2010	Love Ranch	Grace Bontempo	
2010	The Tempest	Prospera	
2010	Brighton Rock	Ida	
2010	RED	Victoria Winslow	
2010	Legend of the Guardians: The Owls of Ga'Hoole	Nyra (voice)	
2010	The Debt	Rachel Singer	
2011	Arthur	Lillian Hobson	
2012	The Door	Emerenc	
2012	Hitchcock	Alma Reville	
2013	Monsters University	Dean Hardscrabble (voice)	
2013	RED 2	Victoria Winslow	
2014	The Hundred-Foot Journey	Madame Mallory	
2015	Woman in Gold	Maria Altmann	
2015	Unity	Narrator (voice)	
2015	Eye in the Sky	Colonel Katherine Powell	
2015	Trumbo	Hedda Hopper	
2016	Collateral Beauty	Brigitte	
2017	Cries from Syria	Narrator (voice)	
2017	The Fate of the Furious	Magdalene "Queenie" Shaw	Uncredited
2017	The Leisure Seeker	Ella Spencer	
2018	Winchester	Sarah Winchester	
2018	The Nutcracker and the Four Realms	Mother Ginger	
2019	Berlin, I Love You	Margaret	
2019	Anna	Olga	
2019	Hobbs & Shaw	Magdalene "Queenie" Shaw	
2019	The Good Liar	Betty McLeish	
2019	#AnneFrank. Parallel Stories	Narrator (voice)	
2020	The One and Only Ivan	Snickers (voice)	
2020	The Duke	Dorothy Bunton	
2021	F9	Magdalene "Queenie" Shaw	
2023	Golda	Golda Meir	
2023	Shazam! Fury of the Gods	Hespera	
2023	Fast X	Magdalene "Queenie" Shaw	
2023	Barbie	Narrator	
2024	White Bird	Grandmère / old Sara Blum	
2025	The Thursday Murder Club	Elizabeth Best	
2025	Goodbye June	June Cheshire	
2026	A Talent for Murder	Patricia Highsmith	

== Television ==
Year	Title	Role	Notes
1974	Thriller	Stella McKenzie/Angela Ludlow	Episode: "A Coffin for the Bride"
1974–1978	BBC Play of the Month	Various	4 episodes
1975	Caesar and Claretta	Claretta Petacci	TV film
1975	The Philanthropist	Celia	TV film
1978, 1982	BBC Television Shakespeare	Rosalind/Imogen	Episodes: As You Like It, Cymbeline
1979	ITV Playhouse	Joanne	Episode: "The Quiz Kid"
1979	S.O.S. Titanic	Mary Sloan	TV film
1985	The Twilight Zone	Maddie Duncan	Episode: "Dead Woman's Shoes"
1987	Faerie Tale Theatre	Princess Amelia	Episode: "The Little Mermaid"
1987	Cause Célèbre	Alma Rattenbury	TV film
1988	Coming Through	Frieda von Richtofen Weekley	TV film
1989	Red King, White Knight	Anna	TV film
1991–2006	Prime Suspect	Jane Tennison	15 episodes
1993	The Hidden Room		Episode: "Love Crimes"
1996	Losing Chase	Chase Phillips	TV film
1997	Painted Lady	Maggie Sheridan	Miniseries
1998	Tracey Takes On...	Professor Horen	Episode: "Culture"
1999	The Passion of Ayn Rand	Ayn Rand	TV film
2002	Door to Door	Mrs. Porter	TV film
2002	Georgetown	Annabelle Garrison	TV film
2003	The Roman Spring of Mrs. Stone	Karen Stone	TV film
2004	Frasier	Babette (voice)	Episode: "Coots and Ladders"
2004	Pride	Macheeba	Voice; TV film
2005	Third Watch	Annie Foster	Episode: "Revelations"
2005	Elizabeth I	Queen Elizabeth I	Miniseries, 2 episodes
2010	Saturday Night Live	Herself	Episode: "Bryan Cranston/Kanye West"
2011	Saturday Night Live	Herself (host)	Episode: "Helen Mirren/Foo Fighters"
2012	Glee	Becky's Inner Voice	Uncredited voice role; 2 episodes
2013	Phil Spector	Linda Kenney Baden	TV film
2015–present	Documentary Now!	Herself (host)	26 episodes
2017	World War One Remembered: Passchendaele	Herself (host)	Miniseries
2019	Catherine the Great	Catherine the Great	Miniseries, 4 episodes and also executive producer
2020	Sarah Cooper: Everything's Fine	Billy Bush	Television special
2021	Solos	Peg	Episode: "Peg"
2021	Harry Potter: Hogwarts Tournament of Houses	Herself (host)	Television special
2021	When Nature Calls with Helen Mirren	Narrator (voice)	7 episodes
2022	Human Resources	Shame Wizard Rita St. Swithens (voice)	Episode: "Bad Mummies"
2022–2025	1923	Cara Dutton	Main cast
2025–present	MobLand	Maeve Harrigan	Main cast

== Music videos ==
Year	Title	Role	Notes
2022	"Count Me Out"	Kendrick's Therapist	

== Theatre ==
- Cleopatra, Antony and Cleopatra, National Youth Theatre, The Old Vic, London, 1965
- Cathleen, Long Day's Journey into Night, Century Theatre, Manchester, 1965
- Kitty, Charley's Aunt, Century Theatre, Manchester, 1967
- Nerissa, The Merchant of Venice, Century Theatre, Manchester, 1967
- Castiza, The Revenger's Tragedy, Royal Shakespeare Company, Stratford-upon-Avon, 1967
- Diana, All's Well That Ends Well, Royal Shakespeare Company, Stratford-upon-Avon, 1967
- Cressida, Troilus and Cressida, Royal Shakespeare Company, Aldwych Theatre, London, 1968
- Hero, Much Ado About Nothing, Royal Shakespeare Company, Aldwych Theatre, 1968–1969
- Win-the-Fight Littlewit, Bartholomew Fair, Royal Shakespeare Company, Aldwych Theatre, 1969
- Lady Anne, Richard III, Royal Shakespeare Company, Stratford-upon-Avon, 1970
- Ophelia, Hamlet, Royal Shakespeare Company, Stratford-upon-Avon, 1970
- Julia, The Two Gentlemen of Verona, Royal Shakespeare Company, Stratford-upon-Avon, 1970
- Tatyana, Enemies, Royal Shakespeare Company, Aldwych Theatre, 1971
- Harriet, The Man of Mode, Royal Shakespeare Company, Aldwych Theatre, 1971
- Title role, Miss Julie, Royal Shakespeare Company, Aldwych Theatre, 1971
- Elayne, The Balcony, Royal Shakespeare Company, Aldwych Theatre, 1971
- Isabella, Measure for Measure, Riverside Studios, London, 1974
- Lady Macbeth, Macbeth, Royal Shakespeare Company, Stratford-upon-Avon, 1974, then Aldwych Theatre, 1975
- Maggie, Teeth 'n' Smiles, Royal Court Theatre, London, 1975, then Wyndham's Theatre, London, 1976
- Nina, The Seagull, Lyric Theatre, London, 1975
- Ella, The Bed Before Yesterday, Lyric Theatre, 1975
- Queen Margaret, Henry VI, Parts I, II and III, Royal Shakespeare Company, Stratford-upon-Avon, 1977, then Aldwych Theatre, 1978
- Title role, The Duchess of Malfi, Royal Exchange Theatre, Manchester, 1980, then The Roundhouse, London, 1981
- Grace, Faith Healer, Royal Court Theatre, 1981
- Cleopatra, Antony and Cleopatra, Pit Theatre, London, 1983
- Moll Cutpurse, The Roaring Girl, Barbican Theatre, London, 1983
- Marjorie, Extremities, Duchess Theatre, London, 1984
- Title role, Madame Bovary, Watford Palace Theatre, 1987
- Angela, "Some Kind of Love Story" and dying woman, "Elegy for a Lady," in Two-Way Mirror (double-bill), Young Vic Theatre, London, 1989
- Rosetta Borsi, Sex Please, We're Italian, Young Vic Theatre, 1991
- Natalya Petrovna, A Month in the Country, Albery Theatre, London, 1994, then Criterion Theatre, New York City, 1995
- Cleopatra, Antony and Cleopatra, Royal National Theatre, London, 1998
- Collected Stories, Theatre Royal Haymarket, London, 1999
- Lady Torrance, Orpheus Descending, Donmar Warehouse, London, 2000
- Alice, The Dance of Death, Broadhurst Theatre, New York City, 2001
- Christine Mannon, Mourning Becomes Electra, Royal National Theatre, 2003
- Title role, Phèdre, Royal National Theatre, 2009
- Elizabeth II, The Audience, Gielgud Theatre, London, 2013
- Elizabeth II, The Audience, Gerald Schoenfeld Theatre, New York City, 2015

== See also ==
- List of awards and nominations received by Helen Mirren
