= List of awards and nominations received by Helen Mirren =

Dame Helen Mirren awards and nominations
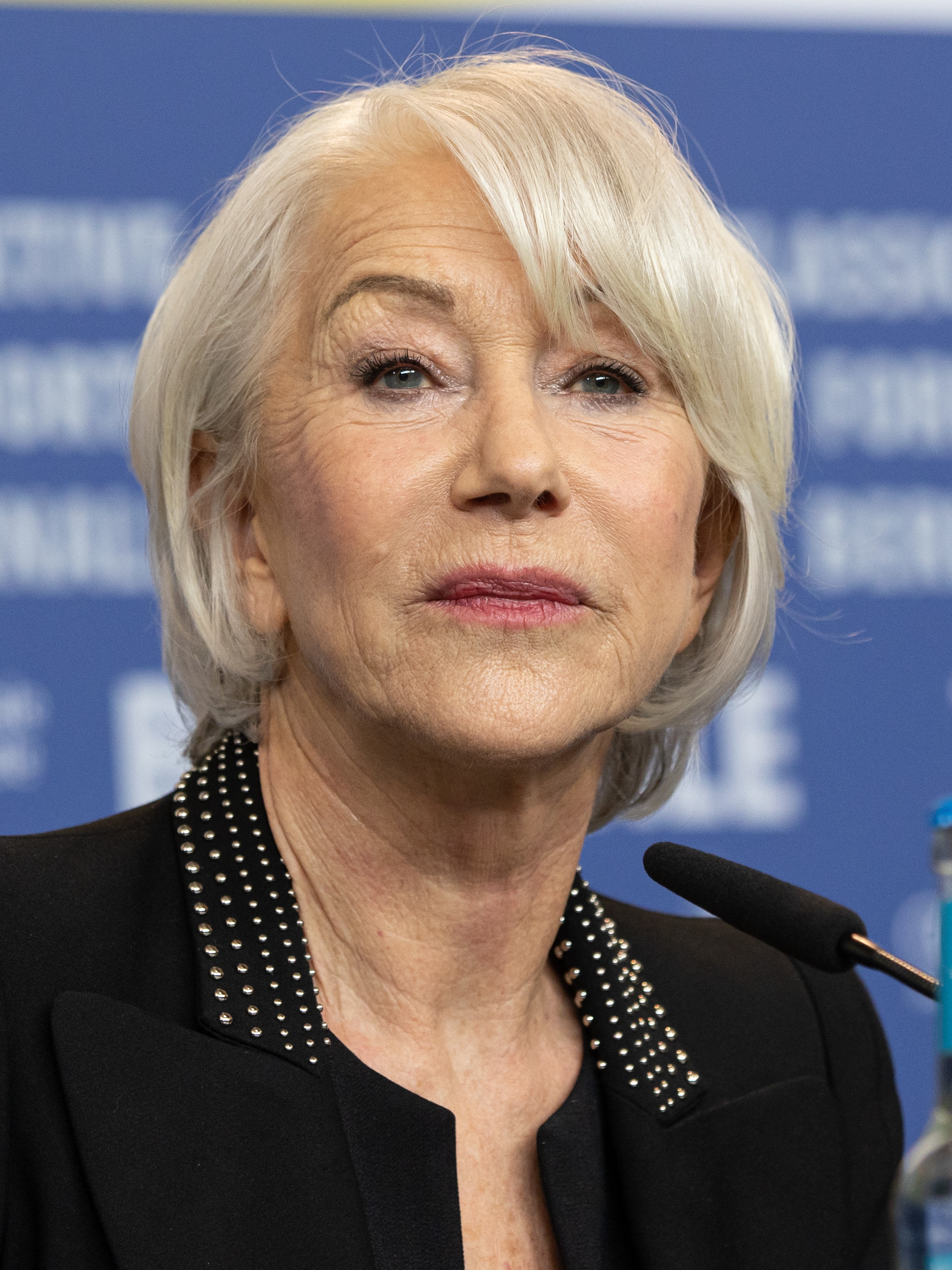
- Mirren at the Berlinale 2020
Awards and nominations
Award	Wins	Nominations
Academy Awards	1	4
BAFTA Awards	4	11
Emmy Awards	5	12
Golden Globe Awards	3	16
SAG Awards	5	14
Laurence Olivier Awards	1	4
Tony Awards	1	3

Totals (Note: Certain award groups do not simply award one winner. They acknowledge several different recipients, have runners-up, and have third place. Since this is a specific recognition and is different from losing an award, runner-up mentions are considered wins in this award tally. For simplification and to avoid errors, each award in this list has been presumed to have had a prior nomination.)
- Wins: 21
- Nominations: 66

Dame Helen Mirren is an English actor whose career has spanned over six decades, with recognition for her work in film, television, and on stage. She has received numerous accolades including an Academy Award, four BAFTA Awards, three Golden Globe Awards, four Primetime Emmy Awards, five Screen Actors Guild Awards, a Peabody Award, a Laurence Olivier Award, and a Tony Award. She was made a Dame Commander of the Most Excellent Order of the British Empire (DBE) by Elizabeth II in 2003 for her services to drama.

She received the Academy Award for Best Actress, the BAFTA Award for Best Actress in a Leading Role, the Golden Globe Award for Best Actress in a Motion Picture – Drama, and the Screen Actors Guild Award for Outstanding Actress in a Leading Role for her portrayal of Elizabeth II in The Queen (2006). She was Oscar-nominated for The Madness of King George (1994), Gosford Park (2001), and The Last Station (2009). She was Globe-nominated for being Alma Hitchcock in Hitchcock (2012) and Hedda Hopper in Trumbo (2015).

For television she won 3 British Academy Film Awards and two Primetime Emmy Awards for Prime Suspect (1991–2006). She received the Primetime Emmy Award for Outstanding Lead Actress in a Limited Series or Movie, the Golden Globe Award for Best Actress – Miniseries or Television Film, and the Screen Actors Guild Award for Outstanding Actress in a Miniseries or Television Movie for being Elizabeth I in said HBO miniseries (2005).

On stage, she played Queen Elizabeth II in the Peter Morgan play The Audience on the West End and Broadway stage winning the Laurence Olivier Award for Best Actress and Tony Award for Best Actress in a Play respectively. She was previously Tony-nominated for playing Natalia Petrovna in the Ivan Turgenev play A Month in the Country (1995) and Alice in the August Strindberg play The Dance of Death (2002).

Mirren is one of few actresses to have achieved the Triple Crown of Acting, which is competitive Academy Award, Emmy Award, and Tony Award wins, as well the British equivalent of British Academy Film and Television Awards plus an Olivier, and the only person to have completed both crowns. She has received several honorary awards, including the BAFTA Fellowship in 2013, the Film Society of Lincoln Center Gala Tribute in 2018, the Berlin International Film Festival's Honorary Golden Bear in 2020, and the Screen Actors Guild Life Achievement Award in 2022.

== Major associations ==
=== Academy Awards ===
Year	Category	Nominated work	Result	Ref.
1995	Best Supporting Actress	The Madness of King George	Nominated	
2002	Best Supporting Actress	Gosford Park	Nominated	
2007	Best Actress	The Queen	Won	
2010	Best Actress	The Last Station	Nominated	

=== Actor Awards ===
Year	Category	Nominated work	Result	Ref.
1999	Outstanding Female Actor in a Miniseries or Television Movie	The Passion of Ayn Rand	Nominated	
2001	Outstanding Cast in a Motion Picture	Gosford Park	Won	
2001	Outstanding Female Actor in a Supporting Role	Gosford Park	Won	
2002	Outstanding Female Actor in a Miniseries or Television Movie	Door to Door	Nominated	
2003	Outstanding Female Actor in a Miniseries or Television Movie	The Roman Spring of Mrs. Stone	Nominated	
2006	Outstanding Female Actor in a Miniseries or Television Movie	Elizabeth I	Won	
2006	Outstanding Female Actor in a Leading Role	The Queen	Won	
2009	Outstanding Female Actor in a Leading Role	The Last Station	Nominated	
2012	Outstanding Female Actor in a Leading Role	Hitchcock	Nominated	
2013	Outstanding Female Actor in a Miniseries or Television Movie	Phil Spector	Won	
2015	Outstanding Female Actor in a Leading Role	Woman in Gold	Nominated	
2015	Outstanding Female Actor in a Supporting Role	Trumbo	Nominated	
2015	Outstanding Cast in a Motion Picture	Trumbo	Nominated	
2021	Life Achievement Award	—N/a	Honored	
2023	Outstanding Cast in a Motion Picture	Barbie	Nominated	

=== BAFTA Awards ===
Year	Category	Nominated work	Result	Ref.
British Academy Film Awards
1984	Best Actress in a Leading Role	Cal	Nominated	
1995	Best Actress in a Leading Role	The Madness of King George	Nominated	
2001	Best Actress in a Supporting Role	Gosford Park	Nominated	
2006	Best Actress in a Leading Role	The Queen	Won	
2012	Best Actress in a Leading Role	Hitchcock	Nominated	
2013	BAFTA Fellowship	—N/a	Honored	
British Academy Television Awards
1991	Best Actress	Prime Suspect	Won	
1992	Best Actress	Prime Suspect 2	Won	
1993	Best Actress	Prime Suspect 3	Won	
1995	Best Actress	Prime Suspect 4: The Lost Child	Nominated	
1996	Best Actress	Prime Suspect 5: Errors of Judgement	Nominated	
2003	Best Actress	Prime Suspect 6: The Last Witness	Nominated	

=== Emmy Awards ===
Year	Category	Nominated work	Result	Ref.
Primetime Emmy Awards
1993	Outstanding Lead Actress in a Miniseries or a Movie	Prime Suspect 2	Nominated	
1994	Outstanding Lead Actress in a Miniseries or a Movie	Prime Suspect 3	Nominated	
1996	Outstanding Lead Actress in a Miniseries or a Movie	Prime Suspect 4: The Scent of Darkness	Won	
1997	Outstanding Lead Actress in a Miniseries or a Movie	Prime Suspect 5: Errors of Judgement	Nominated	
1999	Outstanding Lead Actress in a Miniseries or a Movie	The Passion of Ayn Rand	Won	
2003	Outstanding Lead Actress in a Miniseries or a Movie	The Roman Spring of Mrs. Stone	Nominated	
2003	Outstanding Supporting Actress in a Miniseries or a Movie	Door to Door	Nominated	
2004	Outstanding Lead Actress in a Miniseries or a Movie	Prime Suspect 6: The Last Witness	Nominated	
2006	Outstanding Lead Actress in a Miniseries or a Movie	Elizabeth I	Won	
2007	Outstanding Lead Actress in a Miniseries or a Movie	Prime Suspect: The Final Act	Won	
2013	Outstanding Lead Actress in a Miniseries or a Movie	Phil Spector	Nominated	
Children’s & Family Emmy Awards
2022	Outstanding Host	Harry Potter: Hogwarts Tournament of Houses	Won	

=== Golden Globe Awards ===
Year	Category	Nominated work	Result	Ref.
1996	Best Actress – Miniseries or Television Film	Losing Chase	Won	
1999	Best Actress – Miniseries or Television Film	The Passion of Ayn Rand	Nominated	
2001	Best Supporting Actress – Motion Picture	Gosford Park	Nominated	
2002	Best Actress – Miniseries or Television Film	Door to Door	Nominated	
2003	Best Actress in a Motion Picture – Comedy or Musical	Calendar Girls	Nominated	
2003	Best Actress – Miniseries or Television Film	The Roman Spring of Mrs. Stone	Nominated	
2006	Best Actress in a Motion Picture – Drama	The Queen	Won	
2006	Best Actress – Miniseries or Television Film	Elizabeth I	Won	
2006	Best Actress – Miniseries or Television Film	Prime Suspect: The Final Act	Nominated	
2009	Best Actress in a Motion Picture – Drama	The Last Station	Nominated	
2012	Best Actress in a Motion Picture – Drama	Hitchcock	Nominated	
2013	Best Actress – Miniseries or Television Film	Phil Spector	Nominated	
2014	Best Actress in a Motion Picture – Comedy or Musical	The Hundred-Foot Journey	Nominated	
2015	Best Supporting Actress – Motion Picture	Trumbo	Nominated	
2017	Best Actress in a Motion Picture – Comedy or Musical	The Leisure Seeker	Nominated	
2019	Best Actress – Miniseries or Television Film	Catherine the Great	Nominated	
2023	Best Actress in a Television Series – Drama	1923	Nominated	
2026	Cecil B. DeMille Award	—N/a	Honored	
2026	Best Actress in a Television Series – Drama	MobLand	Nominated	

=== Olivier Awards ===
Year	Category	Nominated work	Result	Ref.
1983	Actress of the Year in a Revival	Antony and Cleopatra	Nominated	
2001	Best Actress	Orpheus Descending	Nominated	
2004	Best Actress	Mourning Becomes Electra	Nominated	
2013	Best Actress	The Audience	Won	

=== Tony Awards ===
Year	Category	Nominated work	Result	Ref.
1995	Best Actress in a Play	A Month in the Country	Nominated	
2002	Best Actress in a Play	The Dance of Death	Nominated	
2015	Best Actress in a Play	The Audience	Won	

== Industry awards ==
Organizations	Year	Category	Work	Result	Ref.
British Independent Film Awards	2006	Best Actress	The Queen	Nominated	
Critics' Choice Movie Awards	2001	Best Acting Ensemble	Gosford Park	Won	
Critics' Choice Movie Awards	2006	Best Actress	The Queen	Won	
Critics' Choice Movie Awards	2015	Best Supporting Actress	Trumbo	Nominated	
Independent Spirit Awards	2009	Best Female Lead	The Last Station	Nominated	

== Festival awards ==
Organizations	Year	Category	Work	Result	Ref.
Cannes Film Festival	1984	Best Actress	Cal	Won	
Cannes Film Festival	1995	Best Actress	The Madness of King George	Won	
Venice Film Festival	2006	Volpi Cup for Best Actress	The Queen	Won	

== Film Critics awards ==
Organizations	Year	Category	Work	Result	Ref.
AAFCA Awards	2006	Best Actress	The Queen	Won	
Boston Society of Film Critics	2006	Best Actress	The Queen	Won	
Chicago Film Critics Association	2006	Best Actress	The Queen	Won	
DFWFCA Awards	2006	Best Actress	The Queen	Won	
Florida Film Critics Circle	2006	Best Actress	The Queen	Won	
Kansas City Film Critics Circle	2006	Best Actress	The Queen	Won	
Las Vegas Film Critics Society Award	2006	Best Actress	The Queen	Won	
London Film Critics' Circle	2001	British Supporting Actress of the Year	Gosford Park / Last Orders	Won	
London Film Critics' Circle	2006	British Actress of the Year	The Queen	Won	
Los Angeles Film Critics Association	2006	Best Actress	The Queen	Won	
National Society of Film Critics	2001	Best Supporting Actress	Gosford Park	Won	
National Society of Film Critics	2006	Best Actress	The Queen	Won	
National Board of Review	2006	Best Actress	The Queen	Won	
New York Film Critics Circle	2001	Best Supporting Actress	Gosford Park	Won	
New York Film Critics Circle	2006	Best Actress	The Queen	Won	
New York Film Critics Online	2006	Best Actress	The Queen	Won	
Online Film Critics Society	2006	Best Actress	The Queen	Won	
Phoenix Film Critics Society Award	2006	Best Actress	The Queen	Won	
San Diego Film Critics Society	2006	Best Actress	The Queen	Won	
San Francisco Film Critics Circle	2006	Best Actress	The Queen	Won	
Southeastern Film Critics Association	2006	Best Actress	The Queen	Won	
SLGFCA Awards	2006	Best Actress	The Queen	Won	
Toronto Film Critics Association	2006	Best Actress	The Queen	Won	
Vancouver Film Critics Circle	2006	Best Actress	The Queen	Won	
WAFCA Awards	2006	Best Actress	The Queen	Won	

== Miscellaneous accolades ==
Organizations	Year	Category	Work	Result	Ref.
Audio Publishers Association	2010	Audiobook of the Year	Nelson Mandela's Favorite African Folktales	Won	
Audio Publishers Association	2010	Multi-Voiced Performance	Nelson Mandela's Favorite African Folktales	Won	
European Film Award	2003	Best Actress	Calendar Girls	Nominated	
European Film Award	2007	Best Actress	The Queen	Won	
Evening Standard British Film Award	1984	Best Actress	Cal	Won	
Golden Raspberry Award	2018	Worst Actress	Winchester	Nominated	
Golden Raspberry Award	2024	Worst Actress	Shazam! Fury of the Gods	Nominated	
Satellite Award	2001	Best Supporting Actress – Motion Picture	Gosford Park	Nominated	
Satellite Award	2001	Outstanding Motion Picture Ensemble	Gosford Park	Won	
Satellite Award	2003	Best Actress – Motion Picture	Calendar Girls	Nominated	
Satellite Award	2006	Best Actress – Motion Picture	The Queen	Won	
Satellite Award	2010	Best Actress – Motion Picture	The Tempest	Nominated	
Satellite Award	2016	Best Supporting Actress – Motion Picture	Eye in the Sky	Nominated	
Satellite Award	2019	Best Actress – Motion Picture	The Good Liar	Nominated	
Satellite Award	1996	Best Actress – Miniseries or Television Film	Prime Suspect 5: Errors of Judgment	Won	
Satellite Award	2002	Best Supporting Actress – Miniseries or Television Film	Door to Door	Won	
Satellite Award	2003	Best Actress – Miniseries or Television Film	The Roman Spring of Mrs. Stone	Nominated	
Satellite Award	2004	Best Actress – Miniseries or Television Film	Prime Suspect 6: The Last Witness	Nominated	
Satellite Award	2006	Best Actress – Miniseries or Television Film	Elizabeth I	Nominated	
Satellite Award	2013	Best Actress – Miniseries or Television Film	Phil Spector	Nominated	
Satellite Award	2019	Best Actress – Miniseries or Television Film	Catherine the Great	Nominated	
Saturn Award	1981	Best Supporting Actress	Excalibur	Nominated	
Saturn Award	2010	Best Supporting Actress	Red	Nominated	
Saturn Award	2012	Best Actress	Hitchcock	Nominated	

== Theatre awards ==
Organizations	Year	Category	Work	Result	Ref.
Plays and Players	1976	Best Actress Award	Teeth 'n' Smiles	Won	
Theatre World Award	1995	Theatre World Award	A Month in the Country	Won	
Drama Desk Award	1995	Outstanding Actress in a Play	A Month in the Country	Nominated	
Drama Desk Award	2015	Outstanding Actress in a Play	The Audience	Won	
Drama League Award	2015	Distinguished Performance	The Audience	Nominated	
Evening Standard Theatre Award	2013	Best Theatre Play Actress	The Audience	Won	
Outer Critics Circle Award	2015	Outstanding Actress in a Play	The Audience	Won	
WhatsOnStage Award	2010	Best Actress in a Play	Phèdre	Nominated	
WhatsOnStage Award	2014	Best Actress in a Play	The Audience	Won	

== Honours and achievements ==
Mirren was invested as a Dame Commander of the Most Excellent Order of the British Empire (DBE) in the 2003 Birthday Honours for services to drama. When she received the honour, Mirren commented that Prince Charles was "very graceful", but forgot to give her half of the award. Another person had to remind him to give Mirren the star. She also said that she felt wary about accepting the award, and had to be persuaded by comrades to accept the damehood. In 1996, she had declined appointment as a Commander of the order (CBE). On 3 January 2013, Mirren received a star on the Hollywood Walk of Fame, located at 6714 Hollywood Boulevard, in front of the Pig 'n Whistle, and joked about her star's proximity to that of The King's Speech actor Colin Firth, stating: "I couldn't be prouder and more happy that I'm actually going to finally lie next to Colin Firth, something I've been wanting to do for a very long time."

Year	Organisation	Award	Result	Ref.
2004	Britannia Awards	Excellence in International Entertainment	Won	
2006	The Critics' Circle	Distinguished Service to the Arts	Won	
2007	University Philosophical Society	Honorary Patron of the Society	Won	
2011	Moscow International Film Festival	Stanislavsky Award	Won	
2012	Karlovy Vary International Film Festival	Crystal Globe for Outstanding Artistic Contribution to World Cinema	Won	
2012	European Film Awards	European Film Award for Achievement in World Cinema	Won	
2013	BAFTA Awards	BAFTA Fellowship	Won	
2013	Hollywood Walk of Fame	Inductee	Honored	
2015	Gotham Awards	Tribute Award	Won	
2016	National Film Awards UK	Global Contribution to Motion Picture Award	Won	
2016	Capri Hollywood International Film Festival	Capri Legend Award	Won	
2016	Goldene Kamera	Lebenswerk international (Lifetime achievement international)	Won	
2018	Film Society of Lincoln Center	Gala Tribute	Won	
2020	Berlin International Film Festival	Honorary Golden Bear	Won	
2022	SAG Awards	Screen Actors Guild Life Achievement Award	Won	
2022	Peabody Award	Documentary Now!	Nominated	
2026	Filmfest Hamburg	Douglas Sirk Award	Honoured	

== Honorary degrees ==
Dame Helen Mirren has been awarded several honorary degrees, in recognition of her acting career and her promotion of educational and charitable initiatives. These include:

Year of honor	School	Degree
1999	University of St Andrews	Doctor of Letters (Dlitt)
2011	AFI Conservatory	Doctor of Fine Arts (DFA)
2017	University of Southern California	Doctor of Fine Arts (DFA)
2017	Tulane University	Doctor of Humane Letters (DHL)
