= Tania Mallet =

British actress and model (1941–2019)

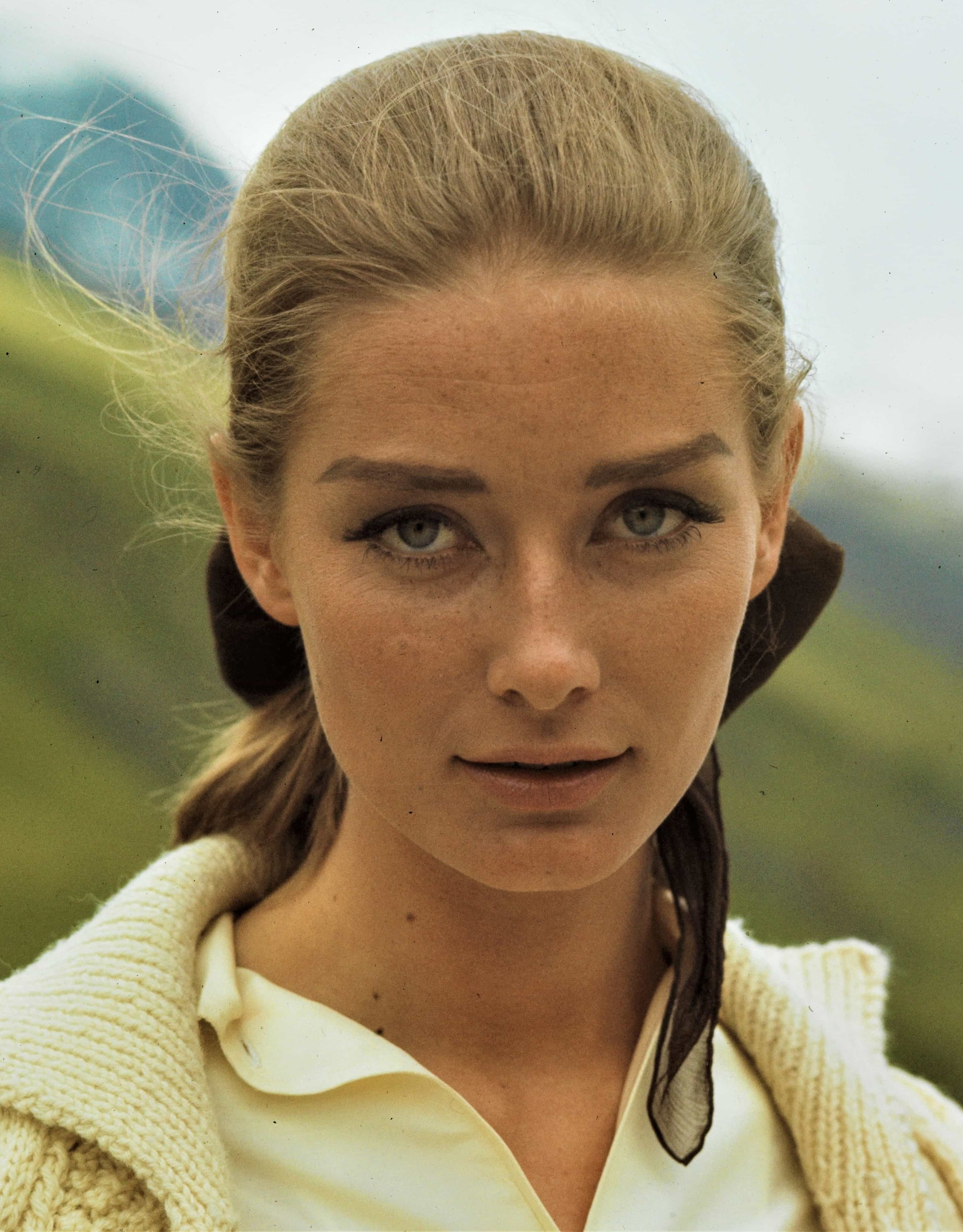
- Mallet in 1964 on set of Goldfinger
- Born: 19 May 1941; Blackpool, Lancashire, England
- Died: 30 March 2019 (aged 77)
- Occupations: Actress; model
- Years active: 1961–1976
- Spouse: Simon Radcliffe (m. 1976; died 2016)
- Relatives: Helen Mirren (cousin)

Tania Mallet (19 May 1941 – 30 March 2019) was an English actress and model, best known for playing Tilly Masterson in the James Bond film Goldfinger (1964).

== Early life and ancestry ==
Tania Mallet was born on 19 May 1941 in Blackpool, the daughter of Russian noblewoman and former chorus girl Olga Petrovna Mironoff (1920–1983) and English millionaire car salesman Henry Mallet (1909–1983). Her maternal grandfather, Pyotr Vasilievich Mironov (1884–1957), was a member of an exiled Russian aristocracy and a colonel in the Russian Imperial Army, and owned a large family estate near Gagarin (formerly Gzhatsk); he was serving as a diplomat in London, in the service of Nicholas II of Russia, as the Russian Revolution was unfolding and decided to stay in the United Kingdom. His mother was Countess Lydia Andreevna Kamenskaya (1848–1928), also a Russian aristocrat and a descendant of Count Mikhail Fedotovich Kamensky, a prominent Russian general in the Napoleonic Wars.

Tania Mallett's surname was registered as "Mallett" but was often credited as "Mallet" with one T, including in Goldfinger. She signed her name with the double "-tt" when giving autographs, and her modelling card as a Lucie Clayton model in 1968 was as "Tania Mallett." Her half-brothers Paul and Peter both spell their names as "Mallett."

Tania was a cousin of actress Helen Mirren; her mother, Olga Petrovna Mironova (later Mironoff) (1920–1983), and Mirren's father, Vasily Petrovich Mironov (later Mironoff) (1913–1980) were siblings. Mallet was educated in both England and France. Her parents divorced and her mother later married conman George Dawson, who served three years in prison for committing fraud.

== Career ==
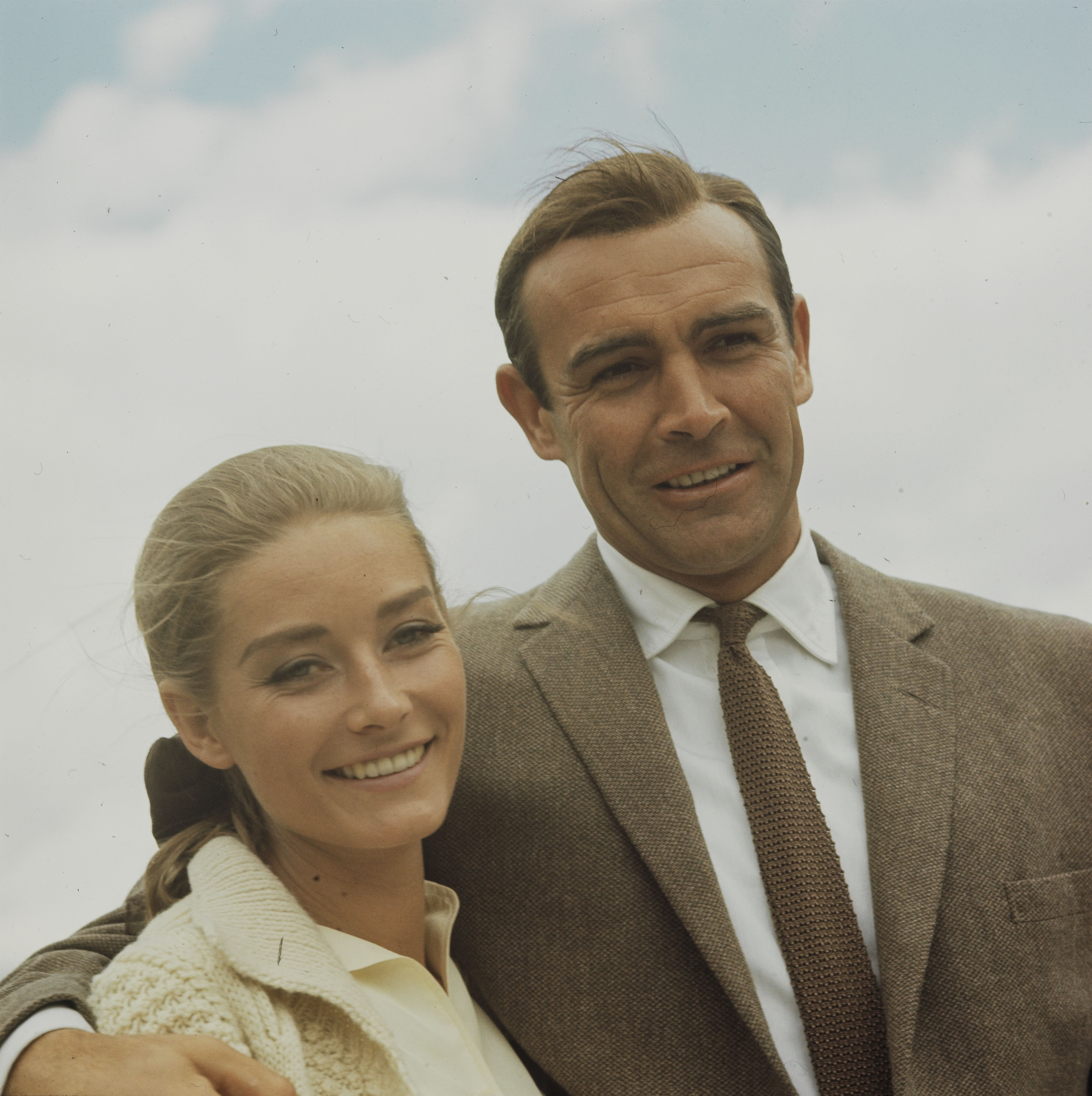
Mallet with Sean Connery in Goldfinger (1964)

Mallet worked as a model before becoming an actress, appearing four times on the cover of the British edition of Vogue between 1961 and 1964. She also played a model in Michael Winner's short film Girls Girls Girls, released in 1961.

Mallet reportedly auditioned for the part of Tatiana Romanova in From Russia with Love (1963); although half-Russian, she was unsuccessful due to her English accent.

Despite the film's commercial and critical success, Goldfinger was Mallet's only major film role. Cast as the revenge-seeking sister of the murdered Jill Masterson (Shirley Eaton), her own character was killed by the steel-rimmed hat of Goldfinger's henchman Oddjob. Her only other acting role was in 1976, an uncredited appearance as Sara in the New Avengers episode "The Midas Touch".

Mallet cited two reasons for returning to modelling and turning down all further film offers. She did not like the restrictions imposed on her personal freedom when she was under contract during the filming of Goldfinger, including being unable to travel abroad or ride horses. She also said the money was "dreadful". She was initially offered £50 a week and managed to increase her fee to £150 a week after tough negotiations, but was still dismayed as she had been earning this kind of money daily as a model.

== Personal life ==
Mallet married Simon Radcliffe in 1976, and became stepmother to his children. They remained married until his death in 2016. It was Mallet's second marriage.

Mallet's cousin Helen Mirren described Mallet in her autobiography as "impossibly beautiful and kind" and "a loyal and generous person" who used her earnings from modelling to pay for her brother's education and financially support her mother.

== Death ==
Mallet died on 30 March 2019, aged 77.

== Filmography ==
Year	Title	Role	Notes
1961	Girls Girls Girls!	Self	Short Film
1964	Goldfinger	Tilly Masterson	
1976	The New Avengers	Sara	Episode: "The Midas Touch"
