= George Dawson (businessman) =

British businessman and convicted fraudster

- Born: 9 April 1907; Bermondsey, London, England
- Died: 1985 (age 78); Westminster, London, England
- Occupation: Businessman
- Known for: Deals in army surplus vehicles and scrap metal
- Criminal charges: Charged with fraud and conspiracy in 1938 and 1959
- Criminal penalty: 1938: 18 months' imprisonment; 1959: 6 years' imprisonment, reduced to 4 years on appeal
- Spouses: Florence Redford; (m. 1926; div. unknown); Olga Mallet née Mironoff; (m. 1949; div. 1963)
- Children: 6

George John Frederick Dawson (1907–1985) was a British businessman and convicted fraudster who became one of the country's first post-war millionaires by dealing in army surplus vehicles and scrap metal. His wealth and lavish lifestyle resulted in him being dubbed the "Cockney millionaire" by the press.

Dawson first went into business as a motor vehicle agent, dealing in second-hand vehicles. In 1938 he was convicted on fraud charges relating to his business and sentenced to 18 months' imprisonment.

Dawson made his first major deal in army surplus in 1946, buying 12,000 British army vehicles from the Ministry of Supply. An investigative journalist later reported that the amount paid for the vehicles was only 10% of their true value. In addition, the civil servant who had negotiated the sale became a director of another of Dawson's companies while still working at the Ministry. Dawson made his largest surplus deal in 1950: the purchase of U.S. Army material in Germany comprising 18,000 vehicles and trailers and 6,500 tons of scrap metal.

In 1953 during a dispute between the British and Icelandic governments over fisheries limits, Dawson reached an agreement with Icelandic trawler owners to land and sell their fish in Britain. Although seven landings were made, Dawson's venture was ultimately unsuccessful and he later said it had cost him £100,000.

Dawson was involved in various business deals from 1954 until 1957, at which point he was declared bankrupt. In 1959 he was convicted on fraud charges relating to these deals and received a six-year jail sentence, later reduced to four years on appeal.

Dawson was married twice and had six children. His second wife was Olga Mallet, née Mironoff, mother of Tania Mallet and aunt of Helen Mirren.

== Early career and first prison sentence ==
In the 1930s Dawson worked as a motor vehicle agent, dealing mostly in second-hand vehicles. His company, Dawson (Clapham) Ltd, was incorporated in 1934. On 4 November 1938, at the end of a trial at the Old Bailey lasting 17 days and hearing evidence from more than 160 witnesses, Dawson and three other men were found guilty of conspiracy to defraud Assurance Financial Trust Ltd. The Trust had advanced money on hire purchase agreements submitted by Dawson's company for the sale of motor vehicles. However, many of the agreements were fraudulent as the hirers identified in the agreements never actually received the vehicles. Two of the men were sentenced to three years' penal servitude, Dawson was sentenced to 18 months' imprisonment, and the other man was sentenced to 12 months' imprisonment. On sentencing, the judge told Dawson: "I have some reason to think that you were largely used by older and more experienced men. I think that the happy-go-lucky way in which you lived, led you to close your eyes to what was going on around you." According to Dawson, his sentence was later reduced and he was released after serving 8 1/2 months in HM Prison Wormwood Scrubs.

== Army surplus ==
After World War II, Dawson traded army surplus vehicles and scrap metal. By his own account he made his first deal in 1945, buying German army surplus in the Channel Islands and making a profit of £60,000. Dawson's largest deals were purchases of British army surplus in 1946 and American army surplus in Germany in 1950. He was also involved in other army surplus deals in Norway, the United States, North Africa, Bermuda and France.

=== Britain ===
Dawson traded British army surplus through Ernest Reid & Company with his business partner, Christopher Allingham. In 1946 Ernest Reid & Co bought 12,000 British army vehicles from the Ministry of Supply for £360,000. The deal was investigated in 1952–1953 by crime reporter Duncan Webb who wrote that "according to experts" the amount paid was only 10% of the vehicles' true value. Webb also reported that the civil servant who had negotiated the sale, Norman Henry Teakle, became a director of another of Dawson's companies while still working at the Ministry. Teakle was the subject of an internal investigation and resigned from the Ministry in 1947. Webb also found that when Ernest Reid & Co sold the surplus vehicles on, the sale proceeds recorded in its books were fractions of the true amounts. In one case a customer had bought vehicles for a total of £157,000 but only £15,000 was recorded in Ernest Reid & Co's books, and the remaining £142,000 was paid directly to Dawson. Ernest Reid & Co went into liquidation in 1950 with debts of £19,827, including £11,008 in unpaid taxes and £6,700 still owed to the Ministry.

=== Germany ===
In 1948 the U.S. Army had more than 56,000 surplus vehicles and trailers, many of which were in need of repair, kept in open storage areas in Germany. The Americans made a bulk sale of this material to the German Bizonal Economic Council, and legal ownership was then transferred to the STEG Corporation (State Collection Company for Public Goods). STEG had been created in 1946 by the U.S. Army and the German states within the American Zone of Occupation to collect and utilise army equipment for civilian purposes. Over the next two years, STEG was able to recondition and sell most of the vehicles that were in good condition. In order to dispose of the remaining material, STEG entered into a contract with Dawson on 28 February 1950, agreeing to sell him 18,000 vehicles and trailers and 6,500 tons of spare parts and scrap metal for $3,200,000 (£1,143,000). The purchase price was to be paid in instalments, and Dawson was also required to pay monthly costs for maintaining and guarding the depots.

Dawson experienced difficulties executing his contract due to currency regulations and his non-resident status in Germany, so he had it replaced with a contract between STEG and a newly formed German sales company called Trucks & Spares. The new contract took effect on 14 September 1950 and had the same terms as the original, except the payments were to be made in Deutschmarks rather than U.S. dollars. Trucks & Spares had been created at Dawson's suggestion by three former STEG employees and then sold to Continental Motor Trust, a Liechtenstein-based company owned by Dawson. The creation of Trucks & Spares and the new contract overcame the main obstacles encountered by Dawson. In addition, the outbreak of the Korean War in the summer of 1950 meant the demand for army surplus was now greater than it had been when Dawson signed his original contract with STEG.

Less than a month after the new contract had taken effect, the West German government instructed STEG to freeze its sales of American surplus following a request from the United States to reacquire equipment needed by its army in Europe. The freeze remained in effect from 10 October 1950 until 1 December 1950, and about 8,000 of the best vehicles were taken. A second freeze was imposed from 17 March 1951 until 19 April 1951 to allow the Americans to reacquire material that could be used in the Korean War. Trucks & Spares made a claim for compensation against STEG for the losses incurred due to the two freezes, and an amount was deducted from the purchase price in autumn 1952. However, during his bankruptcy hearings in 1957, Dawson said that the compensation amount had not covered his maintenance and storage costs or his loss of profit, and he intended to make an additional claim against the Americans.

=== United States Congress investigation ===
In 1950 the U.S. House of Representatives Committee on Expenditures in the Executive Departments initiated an investigation into the disposals of U.S. Army surplus overseas, which resulted in Dawson's activities coming under scrutiny. In March 1951 a subcommittee chaired by Herbert C. Bonner heard evidence that American firms had purchased U.S. Army vehicles from Trucks & Spares and reimported them into the United States. Some of these vehicles were then sold to U.S. government agencies. Subcommittee member Thomas B. Curtis said their preliminary information was that Dawson had made a profit of $100 million (£35,700,000) from his deals in Germany. Dawson disputed this figure when interviewed by the British press, and STEG chairman Kurt Magnus later wrote that Dawson had only taken delivery of $1 million worth of vehicles at that point, so could not have made such a profit. On 28 November 1951 Dawson was interviewed in Paris by subcommittee staff members. Dawson provided details of his army surplus deals in Germany and other countries, and denied telling an American journalist that he had bribed officials in STEG and the U.S. Army in order to secure his contract with STEG. He also said he would be willing to travel to the United States at his own expense to testify before the subcommittee.

== Icelandic fish ==
In 1952 the Icelandic government extended its fisheries limits, leading to a dispute with the United Kingdom that would later develop into the Cod Wars. In retaliation, the British Trawlers' Federation announced that it would deny access to its facilities at the ports of Grimsby and Hull to Icelandic trawlers.

In March 1953 it was reported that Dawson was negotiating with Icelandic trawler owners for the sole rights to sell their fish in Britain. Dawson's involvement in the dispute was raised in the House of Commons by Sir Herbert Williams who asked the Secretary of State for Foreign Affairs, Hector Hughes: "Would the honourable and learned gentleman be good enough to advise the Icelandic government to be careful before they come to any arrangement with Mr George Dawson?" However, the Icelandic government did not take part in the negotiations and instead left it to the trawler owners to decide if they wanted to work with Dawson. On 18 March Dawson announced that he had reached an agreement with the Icelandic Trawler Owners' Federation to buy fish landed at British ports, though a formal agreement was not signed until 10 May. Dawson bought fish processing facilities in Grimsby and had a factory staffed and ready by the autumn.

On 14 October 1953 the Icelandic trawler Ingolfur Arnarson docked at Grimsby, and Dawson was present to meet the ship's captain and address reporters. The event was captured in the Pathé newsreel film Dawson V The Rest. One lorry load of fish was transported to Billingsgate Fish Market in London and sold early on 15 October. Another load was offered for auction at the Grimsby wholesale market. The Grimsby Fish Merchants' Association had previously decided by a majority vote not to handle Icelandic fish until the dispute between the British and Icelandic governments was resolved, and only one firm, Wright Brothers, defied the ban and made a purchase. As a result of buying from Dawson, Wright Brothers had its supplies of ice stopped and was banned from buying British-caught fish. The same sanctions were imposed on the Standard Cold Storage company for handling Dawson's fish.

Six more landings of Icelandic fish were made at Grimsby by trawlers operating on Dawson's behalf. However, without the option of selling at the Grimsby wholesale market, Dawson struggled to sell and distribute the fish effectively, and he defaulted on his payments to the Icelanders. On 11 December 1953 employment termination notices were handed to the 80 employees at Dawson's fish processing factory.

Dawson made some further efforts to remain in the fishing industry, including attempts to buy out a fish wholesaler and to market fish in Britain caught by Belgian trawlers, but these were unsuccessful. Dawson later said he had lost about £100,000 in his Icelandic fish venture.

== Bankruptcy ==
On 2 August 1957 a receiving order in bankruptcy was made against Dawson. He was adjudged bankrupt on 24 September 1957, having provided a statement showing gross liabilities of £569,449. He disputed liability for £495,776 of this sum, including a claim for over £200,000 by the Inland Revenue and a claim for £189,000 by the French courts for tax due in France.

A public examination into Dawson's bankruptcy began on 9 October 1957. The official receiver told the court the way in which Dawson conducted his business, including the use of nominees and keeping little or no record of his transactions, would make discovering the true circumstances unusually difficult, if not impossible. The registrar adjourned the public examination indefinitely on 21 May 1958, leaving Dawson as an undischarged bankrupt. He said his decision was based on Dawson's failure to provide a proper explanation of his business dealings.

== Second prison sentence ==
=== Arrest and charges ===
On 28 August 1958 Dawson was remanded in custody after being arrested on charges of conspiracy to defraud. Dawson and five other men appeared in court for preliminary hearings which ran from 12 September until 4 December. All six men were charged with conspiring, between 1954 and 1957, to cheat and defraud such persons as might be induced to part with moneys in connection with transactions relating to the sale and purchase of orange juice concentrate and other articles by false pretences and fraudulent conversion. Dawson alone was also charged with intent to defraud, causing an individual to execute a cheque for £25,000 by false pretences. Dawson and one other man were further charged with obtaining £8,740 credit by fraud.

In November 1954 the Ministry of Food had 448,000 gallons of orange juice concentrate up for sale. Although the Ministry would not provide a certificate stating that the orange juice concentrate was fit for human consumption, Dawson agreed to buy it for £12,800. It was alleged that Dawson then obtained money from investors by telling them contracts were in place to sell the orange juice concentrate at a profit in Germany and France when, in reality, no such contracts existed. In addition, the companies created by Dawson for trading the orange juice concentrate were never solvent, and their main purpose was to enable him to obtain cash by drawing and discounting bills of exchange.

In January 1956 Dawson obtained £25,000 from his friend Winifred Paterson to buy army surplus landing vehicles (LVTs). Dawson had said he could buy 61 LVTs for £40,000 and sell them at a profit in the Middle East. Dawson later told Paterson that the export licence had been stopped, but he hoped to arrange another deal. However, the LVTs were eventually sold for scrap and Paterson only received about £1,200.

In April 1956 Veritas Investments Finance Ltd made a loan of £8,740 to Bulk Containers Ltd, another of Dawson's companies, for purchases of railway locomotives, diesel engines and accessories. Seven locomotives were to be reconditioned, fitted with the diesel engines, and sold in Spain for £7,500 each. The profits were to be shared between Veritas and Bulk Containers. It was alleged that, in order to secure the loan from Veritas, Dawson had stated that Bulk Containers had assets of £60,000. However, the deal in Spain was not completed and Bulk Containers failed to repay the loan.

=== Trial ===
The case went to trial at the Old Bailey on 2 February 1959. The prosecution described Dawson as the "evil genius" at the centre of a conspiracy to cheat and defraud, in which large profits were promised from various schemes and eight individuals were defrauded of a total of £118,148. Dawson represented himself in court and cross-examined witnesses for the prosecution. During his defence statement, which lasted a total of eight hours and 35 minutes, Dawson said he had been persecuted by the police for 10 years and a superintendent in the Fraud Squad had tried to extort £50,000 from him.

On 26 March 1959 Dawson and two of the other five defendants were found guilty of conspiring to cheat and defraud. Dawson was also convicted on nine further counts of obtaining credit by fraud, false pretences and fraudulent conversion. The two other men were also convicted on further counts of fraud. Dawson was sentenced to six years' imprisonment, and the two other men were sentenced to two years' imprisonment.

=== Appeal and reduction of sentence ===
Dawson launched an appeal and, on 2 February 1960, the Court of Criminal Appeal quashed the convictions of Dawson and one other man on the charge of conspiracy. The court also quashed Dawson's convictions on six of the other nine counts, and his sentence was reduced from six to four years' imprisonment. Dawson was released from HM Prison Leyhill on 6 October 1961, having earned 16 months' remission due to good conduct.

== Marriage and children ==
=== First marriage ===
Dawson married Florence Redford in Bermondsey in 1926. The couple had three children: George, born in 1927; Florence, born in 1929 and known as Bubbles; and Robert, born in 1943.

=== Second marriage ===
In 1949 Dawson married former chorus girl Olga Mallet, née Mironoff, mother of Tania Mallet and aunt of Helen Mirren. Dawson and Olga had three sons: Francis, born in 1944 and known as Francois; Anthony, born in 1954; and Daniel, born in 1955.

Dawson and Olga lived at Villa La Saugette, a 13-bedroomed property on Avenue Fiesole in Cannes, and their lavish lifestyle was the subject of newspaper articles. In November 1953 the couple returned to Britain and moved into Riviera Villa, Bowling Green Close, Putney Heath.

Olga moved out of the couple's home in March 1954 and legal proceedings involving Dawson's former secretary, Jasper Addis, followed. Addis was charged with fraud on 21 April after Dawson alleged that he had fraudulently converted a cheque. While being cross-examined in court, Dawson denied telling Olga he was going to frame Addis. Dawson was then charged with threatening behaviour after Addis claimed that Dawson, accompanied by three men of "rough appearance", had threatened to kill him. Olga's mother, Mary Mironoff, told the court that Dawson had telephoned her and said: "I will not go to jail. I will blow my brains out but before I will murder two people: your daughter and Jasper Addis." Olga was granted an interim injunction restraining Dawson from molesting or communicating with her or her mother. Dawson and Olga filed divorce petitions against one another, Dawson alleging adultery with Addis, and Olga alleging cruelty and adultery. However, Dawson and Olga attended court together on 17 May and stated through joint legal counsel that they were terminating all outstanding litigation between them and there was no foundation to the charges that had been made. On the charge of threatening behaviour by Dawson towards Addis, both men were bound over to keep the peace. Additional fraud charges involving other parties were brought against Addis, and he was convicted and sentenced to two years' imprisonment.

In 1955 Dawson and Olga moved into Garden Court, a 20-roomed house with 10 acres of garden in Oxshott. In January 1958 Dawson's mortgage lender was granted a possession order for Garden Court and the couple moved into a rented flat in Putney.

On 1 April 1963 Olga was granted a decree nisi of divorce against Dawson on the grounds of adultery and given custody of their three children.

== See also ==
- Cod Wars
