= Pittsburgh Council for International Visitors =

GlobalPittsburgh (Formerly Pittsburgh Council for International Visitors) is a non-profit community-based organization based in the Pittsburgh, Pennsylvania region that is part of a national network under the umbrella of Global Ties U.S. Inaugurated in 1959, GlobalPittsburgh's mission is to forge cultural, educational, and business relationships between Western Pennsylvania and the global community through citizen diplomacy, thereby creating economic and educational opportunities for all. As the designated liaison for the U.S. State Department’s International Visitor Leadership Program in Western Pennsylvania, GlobalPittsburgh designs and implements tailored itineraries for leaders in a variety of fields who are seeking a gateway to the local community and insights into American culture. Additionally, GlobalPittsburgh provides orientations to the city and offers services to international students, scholars, researchers, professionals from other sponsors and their families. For more than five decades, GlobalPittsburgh has enabled more than 75,000 visiting internationals to connect with tens of thousands of people living in the Pittsburgh region. PCIV became GlobalPittsburgh in August, 2009.

== Notable Clients ==
- Institute for Software Development, Carnegie Mellon University
- Library of Congress
- Meridian International Center
