= Juliet Blake =

American film producer

Juliet Blake is a British-American film, television and web producer. She is Head of Television for TED Talks. Blake executive produced the TED Talks Live TV series for PBS and produces TED Talks India Nayi Soch a TV series on Star Plus in India produced in Hindi, hosted by Bollywood star Shah Rukh Khan. In June 2018 she was awarded an Honorary Doctorate of Humane Letters from Savannah College of Art & Design.

== Career ==
Blake began her career developing successful TV franchises for a variety of networks and production companies in the US and the UK, including the BBC1 series Beast.

In 2000, Blake was promoted to executive vice-president and co-head of Jim Henson Television, where she was responsible for all aspects of the company's worldwide television operations, including global oversight of the Muppet franchise. She developed and produced the Muppets' first TV-movie It's a Very Merry Muppet Christmas Movie.

While working for Henson, Blake oversaw the science-fiction series Farscape, a top-rated show which ran from 1999 to 2003 on the Sci Fi network, joining the show as executive producer in season 3 and working on its final 33 episodes.

Blake became senior vice-president of production at the National Geographic Channel in 2006, overseeing the development and production of National Geographic Television, the channel's in-house production company. During her tenure at National Geographic, she oversaw a budget of over $40 million and was responsible for the production of numerous series, including the NGC's multi-Emmy award-winning program Explorer, the longest-running documentary series on cable TV, and Border Wars, a critically acclaimed series on illegal immigration that ran for five seasons.

Blake produced TED Talks Education (hosted by John Legend) for TED and PBS. She produced The Hundred Foot Journey, a film starring Helen Mirren and Om Puri, shot in France and India, and directed by Lasse Hallstrom with producing partners Steven Spielberg and Oprah Winfrey.

Blake also developed feature films for Arnie Messer and Mike Medavoy's Phoenix Pictures, including the thriller Blood Relatives.

== Personal life ==
Blake is married to Mark Shepherd. They live in Austin and have two daughters: Sophie, a web designer for GitHub and Lily, the CEO of The Double Wild Plant Company.
