= The Hundred-Foot Journey (film) =

2014 film by Lasse Hallström

- Theatrical release poster
- Directed by: Lasse Hallström
- Written by: Steven Knight
- Based on: The Hundred-Foot Journey by Richard C. Morais
- Produced by: Juliet Blake; Steven Spielberg; Oprah Winfrey
- Starring: Helen Mirren; Om Puri; Manish Dayal; Charlotte Le Bon
- Cinematography: Linus Sandgren
- Edited by: Andrew Mondshein
- Music by: A. R. Rahman
- Production companies: DreamWorks Pictures; Reliance Entertainment; Participant Media; ImageNation Abu Dhabi; Amblin Entertainment; Harpo Films
- Distributed by: Walt Disney Studios Motion Pictures (Note: Distributed by Walt Disney Studios Motion Pictures through the Touchstone Pictures banner.) (Select territories); Reliance Distribution (India)
- Release dates: August 4, 2014 (Ziegfeld Theatre); August 8, 2014 (United States)
- Running time: 122 minutes
- Countries: United States; India; United Arab Emirates
- Languages: English; Hindi; French
- Budget: $22 million
- Box office: $94.3 million

The Hundred-Foot Journey is a 2014 comedy drama film directed by Lasse Hallström and written by Steven Knight, adapted from Richard C. Morais's novel of the same name. (Note: An earlier, shorter, version of the novel had been published in India by HarperCollins in 2008.) Starring Helen Mirren, Om Puri, Manish Dayal, and Charlotte Le Bon, it's about a battle in a French village between two restaurants that are directly across the street from each other: a new Indian restaurant owned by an Indian emigrant family and an established French restaurant with a Michelin star owned by a French woman.

Produced by Steven Spielberg and Oprah Winfrey for DreamWorks Pictures through their respective production companies, Amblin Entertainment and Harpo Films (first relaunch film), in association with Participant Media and Reliance Entertainment, the film was released by Touchstone Pictures on August 8, 2014, and grossed $94.3 million at the worldwide box office.

== Plot ==
The Muslim Konkani Kadam family runs a restaurant in Mumbai. As a child Hassan, the second-oldest, would shop with his mother at the market, where he was adept at picking the highest-quality food. Now a young man, he is in training to replace her as the restaurant's main cook. When a mob attacks and burns down the restaurant after a disputed election, his mother dies in the fire. Seeking asylum in Europe, the Kadams move to London but, disliking the climate, food, and their house next to Heathrow, they depart for mainland Europe. Near St. Antonin in the Midi-Pyrénées in France, the Kadams' van's brakes fail. Local woman Marguerite tows them into town. Inviting them into her apartment to deal with the auto repair shop and arrange lodgings for the night, she treats them to a tray of delicious food made with fresh, local ingredients.

The next morning, Hassan and his father Abbu seek out an abandoned restaurant they passed the night before. It had failed because the upscale, Michelin starred, French restaurant Le Saule Pleureur ("The Weeping Willow"), where Marguerite is sous chef, is directly across the street, a hundred feet (Note: 30 meters.) away. Abbu acquires it anyway, as he is confident Hassan's Indian food will attract customers. The Kadams renovate their restaurant, Maison Mumbai. One day, Saule Pleureur's proprietor Madame Mallory, visits to see their menu. Abbu hesitates, but Hassan gladly gives it to her, in case she ever wishes to dine with them. When she buys all of the ingredients they need from the local market on the day of their grand opening, a war of sabotage and complaints to the village mayor erupts between Abbu and Mallory. Simultaneously, Hassan asks Marguerite to help him learn about French cooking, and they develop feelings for each other. The war between the restaurants peaks on Bastille Day, when Mallory's chef Jean-Pierre and two others spray-paint "La France aux Français" ("France to the French") on the outer wall of Maison Mumbai and firebomb the covered outdoor eating area. Hassan catches them, scaring them off, but his hands get burned.

Mallory, deducing who is responsible, dismisses Jean-Pierre and personally scrubs off the graffiti. While she is cleaning, Hassan offers to make her an omelette, which is how Marguerite said Mallory interviews potential chefs. As his hands are bandaged, Hassan instructs Mallory how to make the omelette his way, which uses unusual spices and ingredients. Madame, so impressed by the result, invites him to work at Le Saule Pleureur to get more classically French cuisine training to supplement his natural abilities. Abbu is initially opposed, but ultimately allows it. Marguerite accuses Hassan of using her to get his new position, so they compete for Mallory's approval in the kitchen. He outshines her, and his cooking, which evolves into a unique French-Indian fusion, results in Saule Pleureur receiving a second Michelin star.

Hassan's resultant fame earns him a job at a Parisian molecular cuisine restaurant. While he is gone, Abbu and Mallory begin dating. In Paris, Hassan's style quickly draws attention, and there is speculation that he may bring his new restaurant a third Michelin star. Over time, however, he becomes increasingly lonely and distracted thinking of his family and Marguerite. One night, after the Parisian restaurant is closed, Hassan smells the Indian food a sous chef has brought from home. Invited to join him, Hassan is brought to tears as it unlocks memories. Soon after, Hassan takes a train back to Marguerite's in St. Antonin. He proposes she help him cook a dish he has not made for ages. Preparing it in Le Saule Pleureur's kitchen, the Kadams and some special guests are surprised to see Hassan. Madame Mallory announces she is giving him control of her restaurant, and that he is also returning to the village to run it with Marguerite.

Hassan ignores the call revealing if the Parisian restaurant received a third Michelin star under his time as Chef de Cuisine, saying he will earn a third star with his friends and family. The group carries their meal across the road to eat at Maison Mumbai.

== Cast ==
- Helen Mirren as Madame Mallory
- Om Puri as Abbu "Papa" Kadam
- Manish Dayal as Hassan Haji Kadam
  - Rohan Chand as Hassan Kadam (7 years old)
- Charlotte Le Bon as Marguerite
- Amit Shah as Mansur Kadam
- Farzana Dua Elahe as Mahira Kadam
- Dillon Mitra as Mukthar Kadam
- Aria Pandya as Aisha Begum Kadam
- Michel Blanc as Mayor
- Clément Sibony as Jean-Pierre
- Vincent Elbaz as Paul, manager of the Parisian molecular cuisine restaurant
- Shuna Lemoine as Mayor's Wife
- Juhi Chawla as Ammi "Mama" Kadam

== Production ==
Prior to filming, actors Manish Dayal and Charlotte Le Bon spent a considerable amount of time going to restaurants and observing and learning in kitchens. To create the food featured in the film, producer Juliet Blake consulted Indian-born chef Floyd Cardoz, who practiced "fusing together two cultures through cooking."

Principal photography for the film began on September 23, 2013, in Saint-Antonin-Noble-Val, and there was extensive filming at scenic locales in Midi-Pyrénées. It was additionally shot in the village of Carlus. Some scenes were shot in the Cité du Cinéma studio complex, located in Saint-Denis, north of Paris. After nine weeks of shooting in France, the production moved to The Netherlands.

To make Indian actress Juhi Chawla, who plays the wife of Om Puri's character at the start of the film, look 15 years older than her actual age, the filmmakers aged her digitally in post-production using techniques such as visual refactoring.

== Soundtrack ==
A.R. Rahman composed the music for the film. Hollywood Records released a soundtrack on August 12, 2014.

== Release ==
The first trailer for the film was released on May 13, 2014. Its New York premiere was held at the Ziegfeld Theatre on August 4, 2014, and it was released in the United States on August 8. Walt Disney Studios Motion Pictures distributed The Hundred-Foot Journey globally through its Touchstone Pictures label, except for territories in Europe, the Middle East and Africa, where rights were sold by Mister Smith Entertainment to independent distributors. Reliance Entertainment distributed the film in India. In France, the film was released as Les recettes du bonheur (Recipes for Happiness). The film's theatrical release coincided with the viral Ice Bucket Challenge that was occurring in August 2014 to raise awareness for ALS. In response to the challenge, and after being nominated by the film's producer Oprah Winfrey, fellow producer of the film Steven Spielberg recorded a video of himself participating in the challenge, which was uploaded to the film's promotional YouTube channel.

=== Home media ===
The film was released by Buena Vista Home Entertainment on Blu-ray Disc and DVD on December 2, 2014.

== Reception ==
=== Box office ===
The Hundred-Foot Journey grossed $11 million in the U.S. on its opening weekend, finishing in 4th place at the box office. It went on to earn $54.2 million in the U.S. and $40 million internationally for a worldwide box office total of $94.3 million.

=== Critical response ===
On review aggregator website Rotten Tomatoes, the film has an approval rating of 69% based on reviews from 143 critics, with an average score of 6.2/10; the site's critics consensus reads "Director Lasse Hallström does lovely work and Helen Mirren is always worth watching, but The Hundred-Foot Journey travels predictable ground already covered by countless feel-good dramedies." On Metacritic, the film has a weighted average score of 55 out of 100 based on reviews from 36 critics, indicating "mixed or average reviews". Audiences polled by CinemaScore gave the film an average grade of "A" on an A+ to F scale.

The Wrap's Alonso Duralde called the film "a surprisingly bland slumgullion of food porn and emotional manipulation, filtered through the middlebrow sensibilities of director Lasse Hallström." Variety's Justin Chang called it "the most soothing brand of cinematic comfort food." Edwin Arnaudin of the Asheville Citizen-Times gave the film a "B-plus".

NPR's film critic Kenneth Turan said the film was entertaining while criticizing the predictability of the story and "wish[ing] that the film had more of the messy juices of life flowing through its veins".

=== Accolades ===
For her performance in the film, Helen Mirren was nominated for a Golden Globe Award in the category Best Actress in a Motion Picture – Comedy or Musical.
