= Helen Mirren =

English actor (born 1945)

Dame Helen Mirren CH DBE
- Mirren in 2026
- Born: Ilyena Lydia Mironoff; 26 July 1945 (age 81); London, England
- Citizenship: United Kingdom; United States
- Occupation: Actor
- Years active: 1963–present
- Works: Full list
- Spouse: Taylor Hackford (m. 1997)
- Partner: Liam Neeson (1980–1985)
- Relatives: Simon Mirren (nephew); Tania Mallet (cousin); Rio Hackford (stepson); Mikhail Kamensky (great-great-great-great-grandfather)
- Awards: Full list
- Website: helenmirren.com

Dame Helen Mirren (/ˈmɪrən/; born Ilyena Lydia Mironoff; (Note: Mirren's birth name has also been variously reported as Ilynea Lydia Mironoff, as Helen Lydia Mironoff, or in at least one source as Ilyena Lydia Vasilievna Mironov.) 26 July 1945) is an English actor. (Note: Helen Mirren prefers to call herself an actor; this article uses that term for consistency.) Regarded amongst Britain's greatest actors, Mirren is the recipient of many accolades including an Academy Award, three Golden Globe Awards, four BAFTA Awards, five Emmy Awards, a Tony Award, two Cannes Film Festival Awards, a Volpi Cup and a Laurence Olivier Award. She is the only person to have achieved both the US and UK Triple Crowns of Acting, and has also received the BAFTA Fellowship, Honorary Golden Bear, Screen Actors Guild Life Achievement Award, and the Cecil B. DeMille Award. Mirren was made a Dame Commander of the Order of the British Empire (DBE) by Queen Elizabeth II in 2003.

Mirren started her career as a performer with the National Youth Theatre, where she played Cleopatra in Antony and Cleopatra (1965). She later joined the Royal Shakespeare Company and made her West End stage debut in 1975. She went on to receive the Laurence Olivier Award for Best Actress for playing Elizabeth II in the Peter Morgan play The Audience (2013). She reprised the role on Broadway and won the Tony Award for Best Actress in a Play. She was Tony-nominated for A Month in the Country (1995) and The Dance of Death (2002).

Mirren's first credited film role was in Herostratus (1967) and her first major role was in Age of Consent (1969). She gained further recognition for her roles in O Lucky Man! (1973), Caligula (1979), The Long Good Friday (1980), Excalibur (1981), The Mosquito Coast (1986), and The Cook, the Thief, His Wife & Her Lover (1989). Mirren has received four Academy Award nominations for her performances in The Madness of King George (1994) Gosford Park (2001), The Last Station (2009), winning the Academy Award for Best Actress for her portrayal of Elizabeth II in The Queen (2006). She went on to appear in further films such as The Tempest (2010), Hitchcock (2012), Eye in the Sky (2015), and Trumbo (2015). She has also appeared in the action film Red (2010) and its 2013 sequel, as well as four films in the Fast & Furious franchise.

On television, Mirren played DCI Jane Tennison in ITV's police procedural Prime Suspect (1991–2006), for which she earned three British Academy Television Awards for Best Actress and two Primetime Emmy Awards for Outstanding Lead Actress in a Miniseries or Movie. She also earned Emmy Awards for portraying Ayn Rand in the Showtime television film The Passion of Ayn Rand (1999) and Queen Elizabeth I in the HBO miniseries Elizabeth I (2005). Her other television roles include Door to Door (2002), Phil Spector (2013), Catherine the Great (2019), 1923 (2022–2025), and MobLand (2025–present).

== Early life, family and education ==
Ilyena Lydia Mironoff was born on 26 July 1945 at Queen Charlotte's and Chelsea Hospital in the Hammersmith district of London, to an English mother and Russian father. Her mother, Kathleen "Kitty" Alexandrina Eva Matilda (née Rogers; 1908–1996), was a working-class woman from West Ham, the thirteenth of fourteen children born to a butcher whose own father was the butcher to Queen Victoria. Mirren's father, Vasily Petrovich Mironoff (1913–1980), was a member of an exiled family of Russian nobility dating back to the first half of the 15th century. He was taken to England when he was two by his father, Pyotr Vasilievich Mironov (1880–1957). Pyotr Vasilievich Mironov owned a large family estate near Gzhatsk (now Gagarin) in the Russian Empire. His mother, Mirren's great-grandmother, was Countess Lydia Andreevna Kamenskaya (1848–1928), an aristocrat and a descendant of Count Mikhail Fedotovich Kamensky, a Russian general in the Napoleonic Wars. Mirren's paternal grandfather, Pyotr Vasilievich Mironov, also served as a colonel in the Imperial Russian Army and fought in the Russo-Japanese War. He later became a diplomat in the service of Nicholas II and was negotiating an arms deal in Britain when he and his family were stranded by the Russian Revolution in 1917. He settled in London and became a cab driver to support his family.

Vasily Mironoff also played the viola with the London Philharmonic Orchestra before World War II. He was an ambulance driver during the war, and served in the East End of London during the Blitz. He and Kathleen Rogers married in Hammersmith in 1938, and at some point before 1951 he anglicised his first name to Basil. Shortly after Helen's birth, her father left the orchestra and returned to driving a cab to support the family. He later worked as a driving-test examiner, then became a civil servant with the Ministry of Transport. In 1951, he changed the family name to Mirren by deed poll. She was the second of three children; she has an older sister Katherine ("Kate"; born 1942) and had a younger brother Peter Basil (1947–2002). Her paternal cousin was Tania Mallet, a model and Bond girl. Mirren was brought up in Leigh-on-Sea, Essex.

Mirren attended Hamlet Court primary school in Westcliff-on-Sea, where she had the lead role in a school production of Hansel and Gretel, and St Bernard's High School for Girls in Southend-on-Sea, where she also acted in school productions. She subsequently attended a teaching college, the New College of Speech and Drama in London, "housed within Anna Pavlova's old home, Ivy House" on North End Road in Golders Green. At the age of eighteen, she passed the audition for the National Youth Theatre (NYT); and at twenty, she played Cleopatra in the NYT production of Antony and Cleopatra at the Old Vic, a role which she says "launched my career" and led to her signing with agent Albert Parker.

== Career ==
=== 1965–1979: Royal Shakespeare Company and acclaim ===
As a result of her work for the National Youth Theatre, Mirren was invited to join the Royal Shakespeare Company (RSC). While with the RSC, she played Castiza in Trevor Nunn's 1966 staging of The Revenger's Tragedy, Diana in All's Well That Ends Well (1967), Cressida in Troilus and Cressida (1968), Rosalind in As You Like It (1968), Julia in The Two Gentlemen of Verona (1970), Tatiana in Gorky's Enemies at the Aldwych (1971), and the title role in Miss Julie at The Other Place (1971). She also appeared in four productions, directed by Braham Murray for Century Theatre at the University Theatre in Manchester, between 1965 and 1967.

Mirren was originally meant to play Catherine Earnshaw Linton in the 1970 film version of Wuthering Heights, but the role was eventually given to Anna Calder-Marshall. In 1970, the director and producer John Goldschmidt made a documentary film, Doing Her Own Thing, about Mirren during her time with the Royal Shakespeare Company. Made for ATV, it was shown on the ITV network in the UK. In 1972 and 1973, Mirren worked with Peter Brook's International Centre for Theatre Research and joined the group's tour in North Africa and the US, during which they created The Conference of the Birds. She then rejoined the RSC, playing Lady Macbeth at Stratford in 1974 and at the Aldwych Theatre in 1975. In 1976, she appeared with Laurence Olivier, Alan Bates and Malcolm McDowell in a production of Harold Pinter's The Collection as part of the Laurence Olivier Presents series.

Sally Beauman reported, in her 1982 history of the RSC, that Mirren—while appearing in Nunn's Macbeth (1974), and in a letter to The Guardian newspaper—had sharply criticised both the National Theatre and the RSC for their lavish production expenditure, declaring it "unnecessary and destructive to the art of the Theatre", and adding, "The realms of truth, emotion and imagination reached for in acting a great play have become more and more remote, often totally unreachable across an abyss of costume and technicalities..." This started a big debate, and led to a question in parliament. There were no discernible repercussions for this rebuke of the RSC.

Mirren was also involved in a contentious interview in 1975 with Michael Parkinson on his BBC One talk show in which the host asked several questions to Mirren that were viewed as misogynist. Both Mirren and Parkinson have described the interview as being a product of the era, though Parkinson would call it “embarrassing.”

At the West End's Royal Court Theatre in September 1975, she played the role of a rock star named Maggie in Teeth 'n' Smiles, a musical play by David Hare; she reprised the role the following year in a revival of the play at Wyndham's Theatre in May 1976. Beginning in November 1975, Mirren played in West End repertory with the Lyric Theatre Company as Nina in The Seagull and Ella in Ben Travers's new farce The Bed Before Yesterday ("Mirren is stirringly voluptuous as the Harlowesque good-time girl": Michael Billington, The Guardian). At the RSC in Stratford in 1977, and at the Aldwych the following year, she played a steely Queen Margaret in Terry Hands' production of the three parts of Henry VI, while 1979 saw her 'bursting with grace', and winning acclaim for her performance as Isabella in Peter Gill's production of Measure for Measure at Riverside Studios. Some of Mirren's early film appearances include roles in Herostratus (1967, Dir. Don Levy), A Midsummer Night's Dream (1968), Age of Consent (1969), and O Lucky Man! (1973), and the infamous production of Caligula (1979).

=== 1980–1999: Early film roles and Prime Suspect ===
In 1981, Mirren returned to the Royal Court for the London premiere of Brian Friel's Faith Healer. That same year she also won acclaim for her performance in the title role of John Webster's The Duchess of Malfi, a production of Manchester's Royal Exchange Theatre which was later transferred to The Roundhouse in Chalk Farm, London. Reviewing her portrayal for The Sunday Telegraph, Francis King wrote: "Miss Mirren never leaves it in doubt that even in her absences, this ardent, beautiful woman is the most important character of the story." In her performance as Moll Cutpurse in The Roaring Girl—at the Royal Shakespeare Theatre in January 1983, and at the Barbican Theatre in April 1983—she was described as having "swaggered through the action with radiant singularity of purpose, filling in areas of light and shade that even Thomas Middleton and Thomas Dekker omitted." – Michael Coveney, Financial Times, April 1983. During this time, Mirren took roles in Caligula (1979), The Long Good Friday (1980)—co-starring with Bob Hoskins in what was her breakthrough film role, Excalibur (1981), Cal (1984), for which she won the Best Actress Award at the 1984 Cannes Film Festival, 2010 (1984), White Nights (1985), The Mosquito Coast (1986), Pascali's Island (1988) and When the Whales Came (1989). Mirren's television performances include Cousin Bette (1971); As You Like It (1979); Blue Remembered Hills (1979); and The Twilight Zone episode "Dead Woman's Shoes" (1985).

At the beginning of 1989, Mirren co-starred with Bob Peck at the Young Vic in the London premiere of the Arthur Miller double-bill, Two Way Mirror, performances which prompted Miller to remark: "What is so good about English actors is that they are not afraid of the open expression of large emotions. British actors like to speak. In London, there's a much more open-hearted kind of exchange between stage and audience" (interview by Sheridan Morley: The Times 11 January 1989). In Elegy for a Lady she played the svelte proprietress of a classy boutique, while as the blonde hooker in Some Kind of Love Story she was "clad in a Freudian slip and shifting easily from waif-like vulnerability to sexual aggression, giving the role a breathy Monroesque quality".

Mirren is known for her role as detective Jane Tennison in the widely viewed Prime Suspect, a multiple award-winning television drama series that was noted for its high quality and popularity. Her portrayal of Tennison won her three consecutive British Academy Television Awards for Best Actress between 1992 and 1994 (making her one of four actors to have received three consecutive BAFTA TV Awards for a role, alongside Robbie Coltrane, Julie Walters and Michael Gambon). Primarily due to Prime Suspect, in 2006 Mirren came 29th on ITV's poll of TV's 50 Greatest Stars voted by the British public. A further stage breakthrough came in 1994, in an Yvonne Arnaud Theatre production bound for the West End, when Bill Bryden cast her as Natalya Petrovna in Ivan Turgenev's A Month in the Country. Her co-stars were John Hurt as her aimless lover Rakitin and Joseph Fiennes in only his second professional stage appearance as the cocksure young tutor Belyaev. Prior to 2015, Mirren had twice been nominated for Broadway's Tony Award for Best Actress in a Play: in 1995 for her Broadway debut in A Month in the Country and then again in 2002 for The Dance of Death, co-starring with Sir Ian McKellen, their fraught rehearsal period coinciding with the terrorist attacks on New York on 11 September 2001.

Mirren appeared in The Madness of King George (1994), Some Mother's Son (1996), Painted Lady (1997) and The Prince of Egypt (1998). In Peter Greenaway's colourful The Cook, The Thief, His Wife and Her Lover, Mirren plays the wife opposite Michael Gambon. In Teaching Mrs. Tingle (1999), she plays sadistic history teacher Mrs. Eve Tingle. In 1998, Mirren played Cleopatra to Alan Rickman's Antony in Antony and Cleopatra at the National Theatre. The production received poor reviews; The Guardian called it "plodding spectacle rarely informed by powerful passion", while The Daily Telegraph said "the crucial sexual chemistry on which any great production ultimately depends is fatally absent". In 2000 Nicholas Hytner, who had worked with Mirren on the film version of The Madness of King George, cast her as Lady Torrance in his revival of Tennessee Williams' Orpheus Descending at the Donmar Warehouse in London. Michael Billington, reviewing for The Guardian, described her performance as "an exemplary study of an immigrant woman who has acquired a patina of resilient toughness but who slowly acknowledges her sensuality."

=== 2000–2006: Film stardom and awards success ===
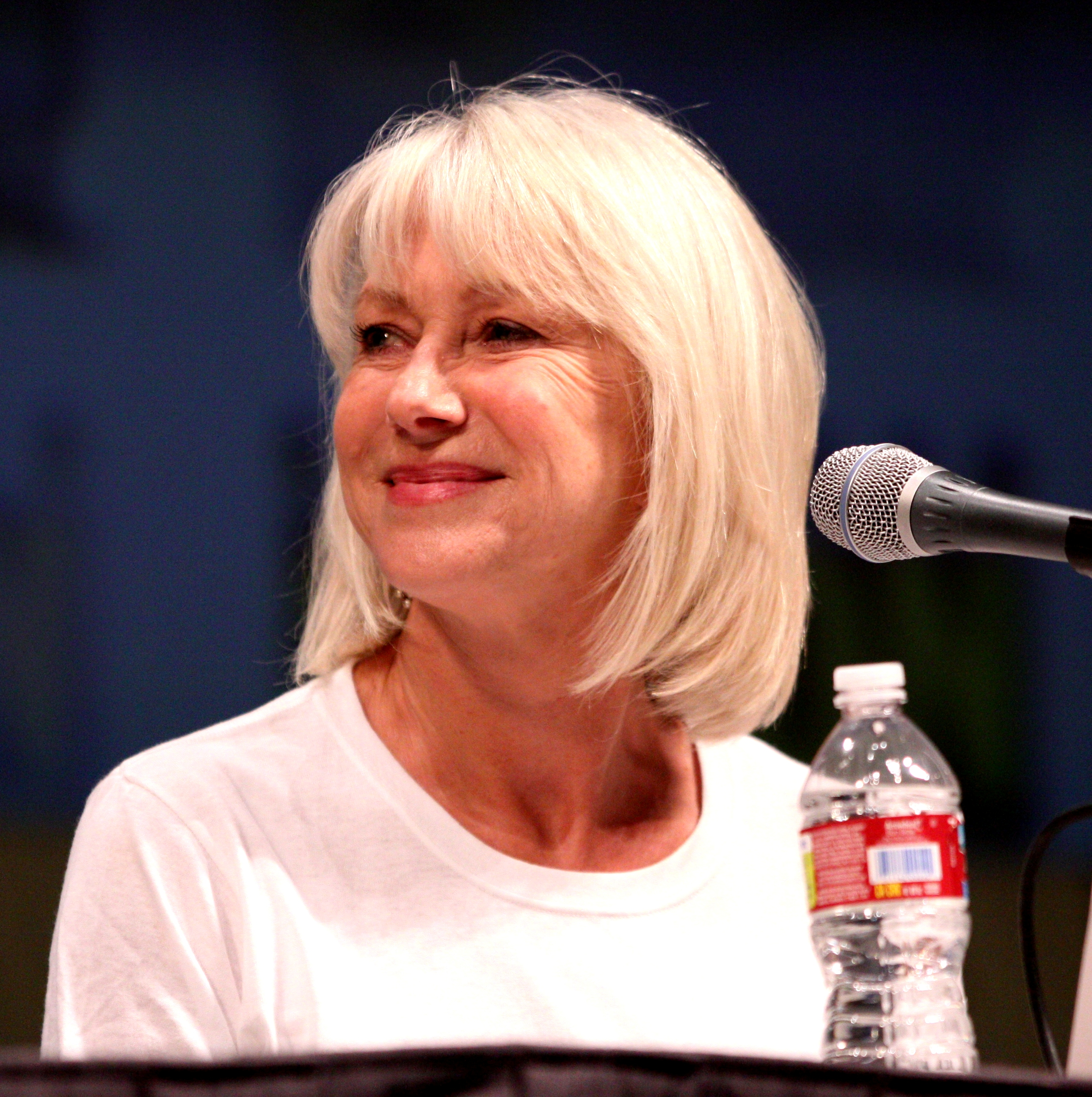
Mirren at San Diego Comic Con in 2010

Mirren portrayed Ayn Rand in the television film, The Passion of Ayn Rand (1999), where her performance won her an Emmy; Door to Door (2002); and The Roman Spring of Mrs. Stone (2003). At the National Theatre in November 2003 she again won praise playing Christine Mannon ("defiantly cool, camp and skittish", Evening Standard; "glows with mature sexual allure", Daily Telegraph) in a revival of Eugene O'Neill's Mourning Becomes Electra directed by Howard Davies. "This production was one of the best experiences of my professional life, The play was four and a half hours long, and I have never known that kind of response from an audience ... It was the serendipity of a beautifully cast play, with great design and direction, It will be hard to be in anything better." She played the title role in Jean Racine's Phèdre at the National in 2009, in a production directed by Nicholas Hytner. The production was also staged at the Epidaurus amphitheatre on 11 and 12 July 2009.

Mirren's other appearances include The Clearing (2004), Pride (2004), Raising Helen (2004), and Shadowboxer (2005). Mirren also provided the voice for the supercomputer "Deep Thought" in the film adaptation of Douglas Adams's The Hitchhiker's Guide to the Galaxy (2005). Mirren's first film of the 2000s was Joel Hershman's Greenfingers (2000), a comedy based on the true story about the prisoners of HMP Leyhill, a minimum-security prison, who won gardening awards. Mirren portrayed a devoted plantswoman in the film, who coaches a team of prison gardeners, led by Clive Owen, to victory at a prestigious flower show. The project received lukewarm reviews, which suggested that it added "nothing new to this already saturated genre" of British feel-good films. The same year she acted in The Pledge, Sean Penn's third directorial effort, in which she played a child psychologist. A critical success, the ensemble film tanked at the box office. Also that year, she filmed the American-Icelandic satirical drama No Such Thing opposite Sarah Polley. Directed by Hal Hartley, Mirren portrayed a soulless television producer in the film, who strives for sensationalistic stories. It was largely panned by critics.

Mirren's biggest critical and commercial success became Robert Altman's all-star ensemble mystery film Gosford Park (2001). A homage to writer Agatha Christie's whodunit style, the story follows a party of wealthy Britons and an American, and their servants, who gather for a shooting weekend at an English country house, resulting in an unexpected murder. It received multiple awards and nominations, including a second Academy Award nomination and first Screen Actors Guild Award win for Mirren's portrayal of the sternly devoted head servant Mrs. Wilson. Mirren's last film that year was Fred Schepisi's dramedy film Last Orders opposite Michael Caine and Bob Hoskins. In 2003, Mirren starred in Nigel Cole's comedy Calendar Girls, inspired by the true story of a group of Yorkshire women who produced a nude calendar to raise money for Leukaemia Research under the auspices of the Women's Institutes. Mirren initially was reluctant to join the project, dismissing it as another middling British picture, but rethought her decision upon learning of the casting of co-star Julie Walters. The film was generally well received by critics, and grossed $96 million worldwide. In addition, the picture earned Satellite, Golden Globe, and European Film Award nominations for Mirren. Her other film that year was the Showtime television film The Roman Spring of Mrs. Stone opposite Olivier Martinez, and Anne Bancroft, based on the 1950 novel of the same title by Tennessee Williams.

During her career, Mirren has portrayed three British queens in different films and television series: Elizabeth I in the television series Elizabeth I (2005), Elizabeth II in The Queen (2006), and Charlotte in The Madness of King George (1994). She is the only actor to have portrayed both Queens Elizabeth on the screen. For Elizabeth I, she received an Emmy Award, a Screen Actors Guild Award and a Golden Globe Award. For The Queen, she won the Academy Award for Best Actress, the BAFTA, a Screen Actors Guild Award and a Golden Globe, among many other awards. During her acceptance speech at the Academy Award ceremony, she praised and thanked Elizabeth II and stated that she had maintained her dignity and weathered many storms during her reign. Mirren won another Emmy Award on 16 September 2007 for her role in Prime Suspect: The Final Act on PBS in the same category as in 2006. At the 64th Golden Globe Awards, she became the second performer to receive three acting nominations in a single year and the third to win two acting awards. At the 13th Screen Actors Guild Awards, she became the first performer to win two individual awards in a single edition. Mirren hosted Saturday Night Live on 9 April 2011. Mirren later appeared in supporting roles in the films National Treasure: Book of Secrets (2007), Inkheart (2008), State of Play (2009), and The Last Station (2009), for which she was nominated for an Oscar.

=== 2007–2019: Established actor ===
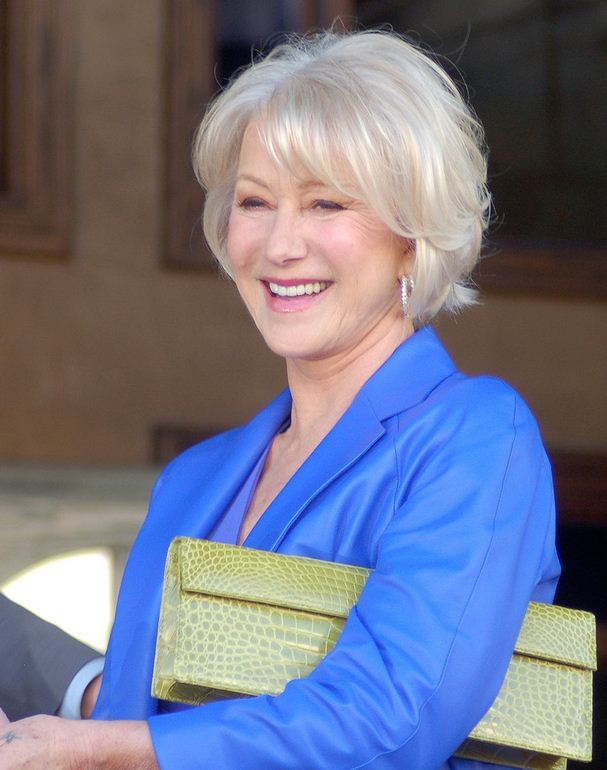
Mirren at the Hollywood Walk of Fame in 2013

In 2007, Mirren said that the director Michael Winner had treated her "like a piece of meat" at a casting call in 1964. Asked about the incident, Winner told The Guardian, "I don't remember asking her to turn around but if I did I wasn't being serious. I was only doing what the [casting] agent asked me – and for this I get reviled! Helen's a lovely person, she's a great actor and I'm a huge fan, but her memory of that moment is a little flawed." In 2010, Mirren appeared in five films. In Love Ranch, directed by her husband Taylor Hackford, she portrayed Sally Conforte, one half of a married couple who opened the first legal brothel in the US, the Mustang Ranch in Storey County, Nevada. Mirren starred in the principal role of Prospera, the duchess of Milan, in Julie Taymor's The Tempest. This was based on the play of the same name by Shakespeare; Taymor changed the original character's gender to cast Mirren as her lead. While the actor garnered strong reviews for her portrayal, the film itself was largely panned by critics.

Mirren played a gutsy tea-shop owner who tries to save one of her young employees from marrying a teenage killer in Rowan Joffé's Brighton Rock, a crime film loosely based on Graham Greene's 1938 novel. The film noir premiered at the Toronto International Film Festival in September 2010, where it received mixed reviews. Mirren's biggest critical and commercial success of the year was Robert Schwentke's ensemble action comedy Red, based on Warren Ellis's graphic novel, in which she portrayed Victoria, an ex-MI6 assassin. Mirren was initially hesitant to sign on due to film's graphic violence, but changed her mind upon learning of Bruce Willis's involvement. Released to positive reviews, it grossed $186.5 million worldwide. Also in 2010, the actor lent her voice to Zack Snyder's animated fantasy film Legend of the Guardians: The Owls of Ga'Hoole, voicing antagonist Nyra, a leader of a group of owls. The film grossed $140.1 million on an $80 million budget. Mirren's next film was the comedy film Arthur, a remake of the 1981 film of the same name, starring Russell Brand in the lead role. Arthur received generally negative reviews from critics, who declared it an "irritating, unnecessary remake".

In preparation for her role as a retired Israeli Mossad agent in the film The Debt, Mirren reportedly immersed herself in studies of Hebrew language, Jewish history, and Holocaust writing, including the life of Simon Wiesenthal, while in Israel in 2009 for the filming of some of the movie's scenes. The film is a remake of a 2007 Israeli film of the same name. In 2012, Mirren played Alfred Hitchcock's wife Alma Reville in the 2012 biopic Hitchcock based on Stephen Rebello's non-fiction book Alfred Hitchcock and the Making of Psycho. The film centres on the pair's relationship during the making of Psycho, a controversial horror film that became one of the most acclaimed and influential works in the filmmaker's career. It became a moderate arthouse success and garnered a lukewarm critical response from critics, who felt that it suffered from "tonal inconsistency and a lack of truly insightful retrospection." Mirren was universally praised, however, with Roger Ebert noting that the film depended most on her portrayal, which he found to be "warm and effective". Her other film that year was The Door, a claustrophobic drama film directed by István Szabó, based on the Hungarian novel of the same name. Set at the height of communist rule in 1960s Hungary, the story of the adaptation centres on the abrasive influence that a mysterious housekeeper wields over her employer and successful novelist, played Martina Gedeck. Mirren found the role "difficult to play" and cited doing it as "one of the hardest things [she has] ever done".

On 15 February 2013, at the West End's Gielgud Theatre Mirren began a turn as Elizabeth II in the World Premiere of Peter Morgan's The Audience. The show was directed by Stephen Daldry. Michael Billington of The Guardian wrote of her performance, "who once again gives a faultless performance that transcends mere impersonation to endow the monarch with a sense of inner life and a quasi-Shakespearean aura of solitude." In April she was named best actress at the Olivier Awards for her role. On 7 June 2015‚ Mirren won the Tony Award for Best Actress in a Play‚ for her portrayal of Queen Elizabeth II in The Audience (a performance which also won her the Laurence Olivier Award for Best Actress). Her Tony Award win made her one of the few actors to achieve the US "Triple Crown of Acting", joining the ranks of acclaimed performers including Ingrid Bergman‚ Dame Maggie Smith, and Al Pacino.

The following year, Mirren replaced Bette Midler in David Mamet's biographical television film Phil Spector about the American musician. The HBO film focuses on the relationship between Spector and his defence attorney Linda Kenney Baden, played by Mirren, during the first of his two murder trials for the death in 2003 of Lana Clarkson in his California mansion. Spector received mixed reviews from critics, with praise for Mirren and co-star Al Pacino's performances, and was nominated for eleven Primetime Emmy Awards, also winning Mirren a Screen Actors Guild Award at the 20th awards ceremony. The film drew criticism both from Clarkson's family and friends, who charged that the suicide defence was given more merit than it deserved, and from Spector's wife, who argued that Spector was portrayed as a "foul-mouthed megalomaniac" and a "minotaur". Also in 2013, Mirren voiced the character of Dean Abigail Hardscrabble in Pixar's animated comedy film Monsters University, which grossed $743 million against its estimated budget of $200 million, and reprised her role in the sequel film Red 2. The action comedy received a mixed reviews from film critics, who called it a "lackadaisical sequel", but became another commercial success, making over $140 million worldwide.

Mirren's only film of 2014 was the comedy-drama The Hundred-Foot Journey opposite the Indian actor Om Puri. Directed by Lasse Hallström and produced by Steven Spielberg and Oprah Winfrey, the film is based on Richard C. Morais's 2010 novel with the same name and tells the story of a feud between two adjacent restaurants in a French town. Mirren garnered largely positive reviews for her performance of a snobby restaurateur, a role which she accepted as she was keen to play a French character, reflecting her "pathetic attempt at being a French actress." The film earned her another Golden Globe nomination and became a modest commercial success, grossing $88.9 million worldwide.

In 2015, Mirren reunited with her former assistant Simon Curtis on Woman in Gold, co-starring Ryan Reynolds. The film was based on the true story of Jewish refugee Maria Altmann who, together with her young lawyer Randy Schoenberg, fought the Austrian government to be reunited with Gustav Klimt's painting of her aunt, the famous Portrait of Adele Bloch-Bauer I. The film received mixed reviews from critics, although Mirren and Reynold's performances were widely praised. A commercial success, Woman in Gold became one of the highest-grossing specialty films of the year. The same year, Mirren appeared in Gavin Hood's thriller Eye in the Sky (2015), in which she played as a military intelligence officer who leads a secret drone mission to capture a terrorist group living in Nairobi, Kenya. Mirren's last film that year was Jay Roach's biographical drama Trumbo, co-starring Bryan Cranston and Diane Lane. The actor played Hedda Hopper, the famous actress and gossip columnist, in the film, which received generally positive reviews from critics and garnered her a 14th Golden Globe nomination.

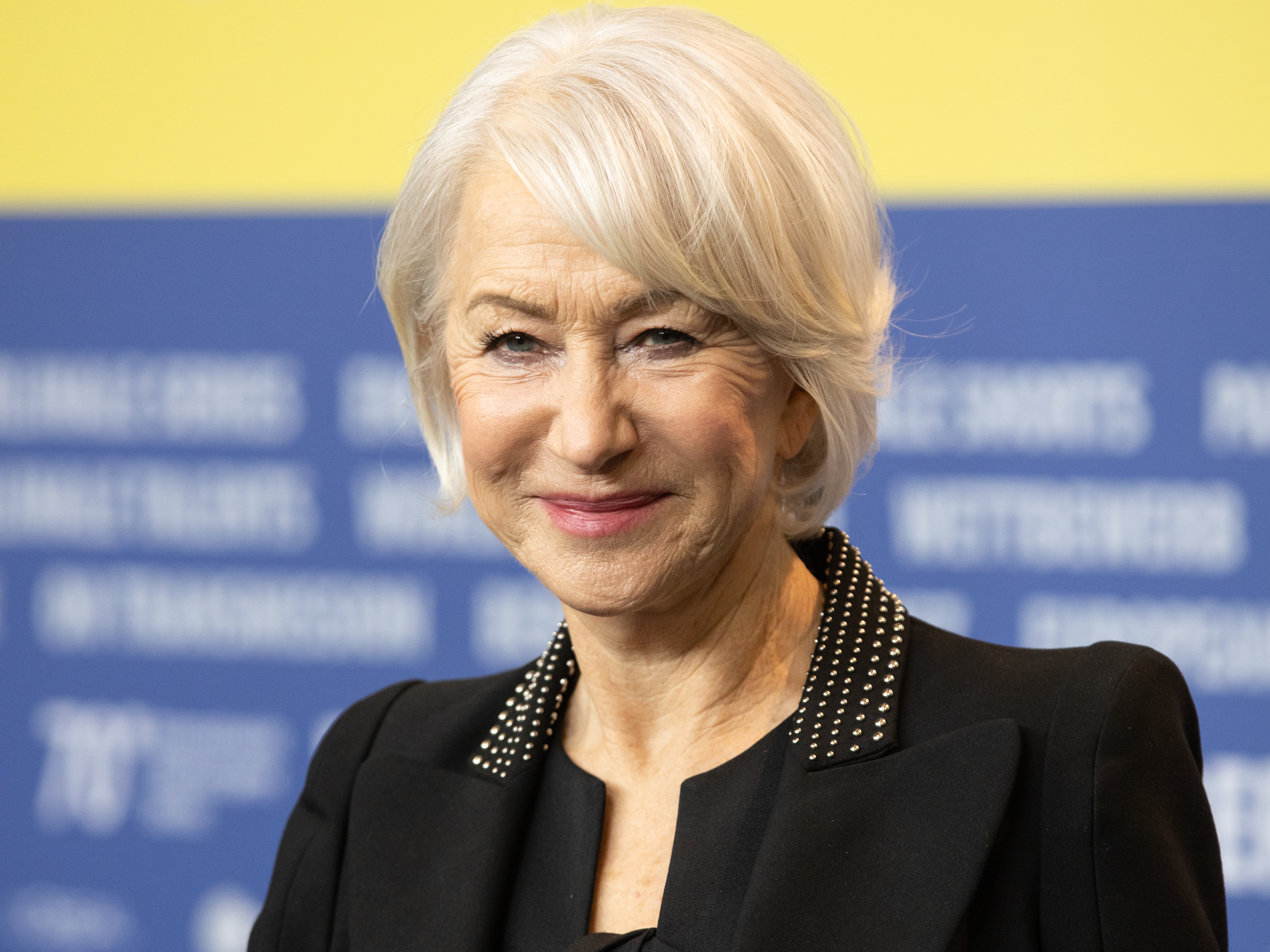
Mirren at Berlinale in 2020

Mirren's only film of 2016 was Collateral Beauty, directed by David Frankel. Co-Starring Will Smith, Keira Knightley, and Kate Winslet, the ensemble drama follows a man who copes with his daughter's death by writing letters to time, death, and love. The film earned largely negative reviews from critics, who called it "well-meaning but fundamentally flawed." In 2017, Mirren narrated Cries from Syria, a documentary film about the Syrian Civil War, directed by Evgeny Afineevsky. Also that year, she made an uncredited cameo appearance in F. Gary Gray's The Fate of the Furious, the eighth instalment in the Fast & Furious franchise, playing Magdalene, the mother of Owen and Deckard Shaw. Mirren had a larger role in director Paolo Virzì's English-language debut The Leisure Seeker, based on the 2009 novel of the same name. On set, she was reunited with Donald Sutherland with whom she had not worked again since Bethune: The Making of a Hero (1990), portraying a terminally ill couple who escape from their retirement home and take one last cross-country adventure in a vintage van. At the 75th awards ceremony, Mirren received her 15th Golden Globe nomination.

In 2018, Mirren portrayed heiress Sarah Winchester in the supernatural horror film Winchester, directed by The Spierig Brothers. In the same year, she starred as Mother Ginger in Disney's adaptation of The Nutcracker, titled The Nutcracker and the Four Realms, directed by Lasse Hallström and Joe Johnston. In 2019, she appeared in the ensemble film Berlin, I Love You, the French crime thriller film Anna, directed and written by Luc Besson, and co-starred in the Fast and the Furious spin-off Hobbs & Shaw.

=== 2020–present ===
In 2021, Mirren appeared in the ninth installment of the Fast & Furious franchise, to mixed reviews. In 2022, she received the Screen Actors Guild Life Achievement Award (presented by Kate Winslet and Cate Blanchett) for her career excellence. She also appeared in the 2022 music video for Kendrick Lamar's "Count Me Out" as a therapist. Since 2022, she has portrayed Cara Dutton in the Yellowstone spinoff 1923, which also features Harrison Ford and Timothy Dalton. Mirren portrayed Golda Meir, prime minister of Israel from 1969 to 1974, in the 2023 biopic Golda. Reviewing the film in Variety, Owen Gleiberman wrote that "Mirren makes her terse, decisive, and ferociously alive". She played the narrator in Greta Gerwig's satirical comedy Barbie (2023), earning nominations for the Critics' Choice Movie Award for Best Acting Ensemble and Screen Actors Guild Award for Outstanding Performance by a Cast in a Motion Picture as part of the film's ensemble. Her other projects of 2023 included Shazam: Fury of the Gods, in which she portrayed Hespera to mostly negative reviews, and the tenth installment in the Fast & Furious franchise, to mixed reviews. The former earned her a nomination for the Golden Raspberry Award for Worst Actress. In 2024, Mirren starred in the war drama White Bird, with Hannah Brown of The Jerusalem Post praising Mirren's performance and crediting her with single-handedly saving the film.

In 2025, Mirren co-starred in the Netflix film The Thursday Murder Club, as well as in Kate Winslet's directorial project Goodbye June. Her starring role as Maeve Harrigan in the Paramount+ crime drama series MobLand, earned her her eighteenth Golden Globe nomination (her first in Best Actress in a Television Series – Drama). In November 2025, it was announced that she would be honoured with the Cecil B. DeMille Award at the 83rd Golden Globe Awards. The announcement referred to the actor as "a force of nature" with a career that is "nothing short of extraordinary", and noted that "her transcendent performances and commitment to her craft continue to inspire generations of artists and audiences alike". She will next star opposite Alden Ehrenreich, Olivia Cooke and Juliet Stevenson in Anton Corbijn's thriller A Talent for Murder, a film adaptation of the play of the same name by Joanna Murray-Smith.

== Political views ==
In 2006, Mirren stated that she was never a member of any political party, but had wanted to see the defeat of the Conservative Party at the 1997 UK general election, calling them "appalling". Mirren became a U.S. citizen in 2017 and voted in her first U.S. election in 2020. She supported Patricia Ackerman in her unsuccessful 2020 campaign against Mark Amodei in Nevada's 2nd congressional district.

In April 2021, Mirren took part in the music video "La Vacinada" (a fake word meaning "she who is vaccinated" in blended Italian and Spanish) of Italian comedian and singer Checco Zalone. Mirren was widely praised in Italy for her appearance in the video, which promoted vaccination against COVID-19 in the country.

Mirren has described herself as a feminist.

=== Israel ===
Mirren has visited Israel multiple times, and has criticised the Boycott, Divestment, and Sanctions (BDS) movement against Israel. She says that her connection to Israel began when she volunteered at a kibbutz with her Jewish boyfriend in 1967, after the Six-Day War. Reflecting on that first visit in a 2023 interview with Israel's Channel 12, she recalled, "I witnessed things that were wrong. I saw Arabs being thrown out of their houses in Jerusalem. But it was just the extraordinary magical energy of a country just beginning to put its roots in the ground. It was an amazing time to be here."

In her interview with Israel's Channel 12, Mirren expressed her continued support for the country's existence, stating, "I believe in Israel because of the Holocaust." She said, however, that she opposed the direction the country was being taken by the Netanyahu government and its proposed judicial reform, but she also opposed a cultural boycott and remained firmly supportive of the state. In 2024 and 2026, Mirren signed open letters by the pro-Israel group Creative Community for Peace (CCFP) expressing support for Israel's inclusion in the Eurovision Song Contest.

In May 2026, footage of Mirren and her husband being confronted in 2025 by a pro-Palestinian activist in London circulated on social media. The activist said Mirren was "very happy the Palestinians' houses were gone" and called her an "evil Zionist bitch". The Metropolitan Police said in a statement that they would be investigating the incident as a possible hate crime. In June 2026, the Metropolitan Police said they would not be investigating the incident after speaking with Mirren and Hackford. Mirren later said she had been "attacked by mistake by a man who was maybe a little over passionate or maybe mentally not quite stable". She reiterated her support for Israel's existence, but said, "Evil forces are rising everywhere, even in a country like Israel... How could you possibly repeat the actions of what was done to you as people to other people? Crimes against humanity, it's called."

== Personal life ==
=== Marriage and relationships ===
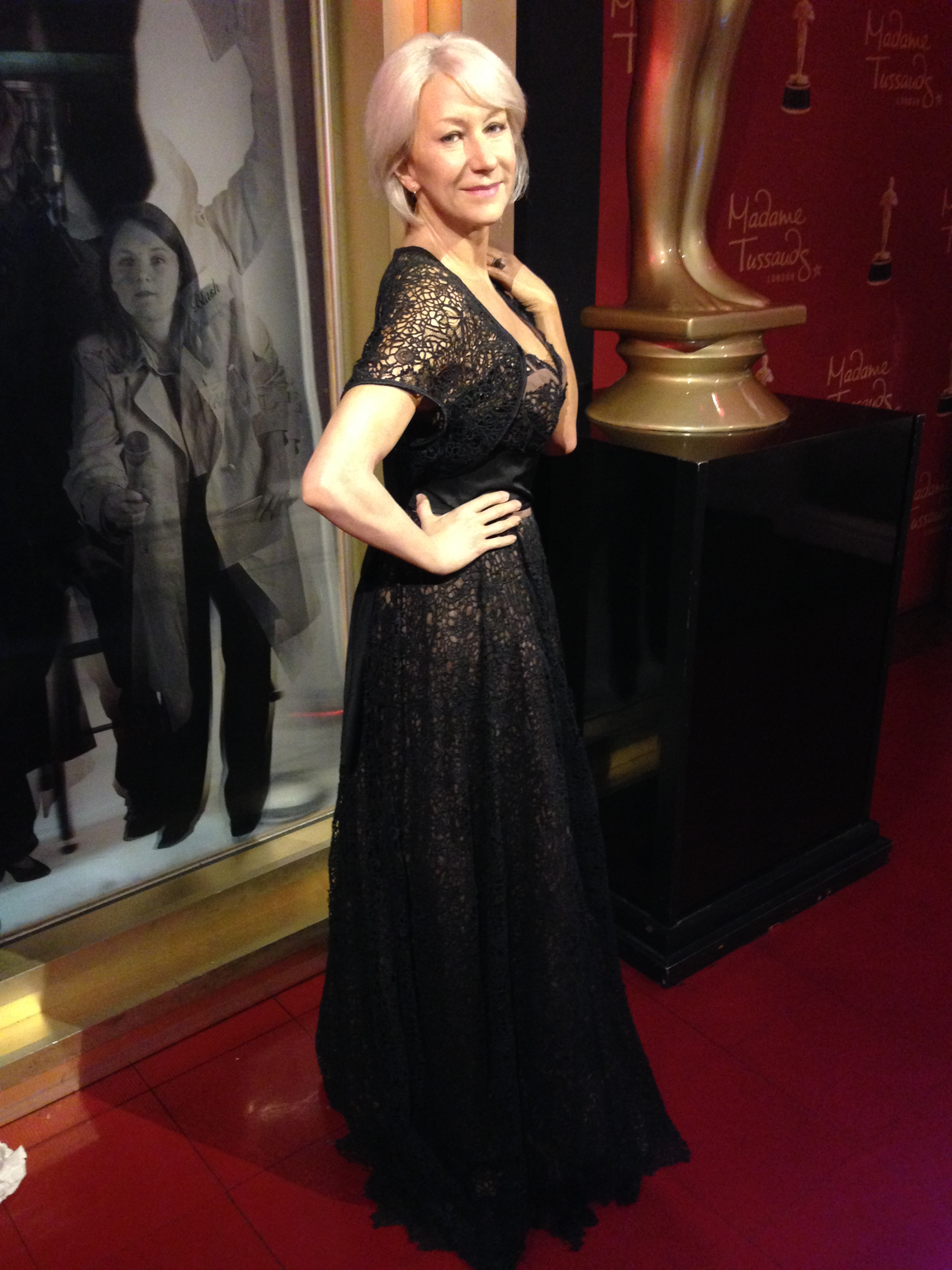
Waxwork of Mirren at Madame Tussauds, London

Mirren lived with actor Liam Neeson during the early 1980s; they met while working on Excalibur (1981). Neeson said Mirren was instrumental in his getting an agent.

In 1985 on the set of White Nights, Mirren met American director Taylor Hackford. The pair began dating in 1986 while Hackford was married to his second wife. The couple eventually married on 31 December 1997, Hackford's 53rd birthday, at the Ardersier Parish Church near Inverness in the Scottish Highlands. It is her first marriage and his third. He has two children from his previous marriages. She has no children herself, and has stated that she has "no maternal instinct whatsoever". She added, "I'm so happy I don't have children. But I do love children and I've got family, and Taylor has children that I'm involved with - and with great pleasure - but it's just not for me."

=== Autobiography ===
Mirren's autobiography, In the Frame: My Life in Words and Pictures, was published in the UK by Weidenfeld & Nicolson in September 2007. Reviewing for The Stage, John Thaxter wrote: "Sumptuously illustrated, at first sight it looks like another of those photo albums of the stars. But between the pictures there are almost 200 pages of densely printed text, an unusually frank story of her private and professional life, mainly in the theatre, the words clearly Mirren's own, delivered with forthright candour."

=== Health and beliefs ===
In 1990, Mirren said in an interview that she was an atheist. In the August 2011 issue of Esquire, she said, "I am quite spiritual. I believed in fairies when I was a child. I still do sort of believe in the fairies. And the leprechauns. But I don't believe in God."

In a 2008 interview with GQ, Mirren said she was date raped as a student, and had often used cocaine at parties in her twenties and until the 1980s. She stopped using it after reading that Klaus Barbie made a living from cocaine dealing.

In 2004, Mirren was named Naturist of the Year by British Naturism. She said: "Many thanks to British Naturism for this great honour. I do believe in naturism and am my happiest on a nude beach with people of all ages and races!" In 2014, Radio Times quoted Mirren as saying, "I'm a naturist at heart. I love being on beaches where everyone is naked. Ugly people, beautiful people, old people, whatever. It's so unisexual and so liberating."

== Recognition and image ==
On 11 May 2010, Mirren attended the unveiling of her waxwork at Madame Tussauds in London. In 2012, she was among the British cultural icons selected by artist Peter Blake to appear in a new version of his most famous artwork—the Beatles' Sgt. Pepper's Lonely Hearts Club Band album cover—to celebrate the British cultural figures of his life that he most admired. In 2011, she posed in a photo shoot for Esquire covered only with the Union Jack.

In March 2013, The Guardian listed Mirren as one of the 50 Best-Dressed Over 50. In August 2013, Mirren featured in Marks & Spencer's "Britain's leading ladies" campaign alongside other British women from various fields, including pop singer Ellie Goulding, double Olympic gold medal-winning boxer Nicola Adams, and writer Monica Ali. In March 2024, to commemorate the 65th anniversary of Barbie and celebrate International Women's Day, Mirren was one of a number of female celebrities who had their likeness turned into Barbie dolls.

== Acting credits and accolades ==
Among her major competitive awards, Mirren has won one Academy Award, four BAFTA Awards, three Golden Globe Awards, five Emmy Awards, and one Tony Award. She is the recipient of numerous accolades and is the only performer to have achieved both the American and the British Triple Crowns of Acting. Her numerous honorary awards include a star on the Hollywood Walk of Fame in 2013, the BAFTA Fellowship from the British Academy of Film and Television Arts in 2014, the Chaplin Award from the Film Society of Lincoln Center in 2018, the Honorary Golden Bear in 2020, and the Screen Actors Guild Life Achievement Award in 2022.

In the Queen's 2003 Birthday Honours, Mirren was appointed a Dame Commander of the Order of the British Empire (DBE) for services to drama, with investiture taking place at Buckingham Palace in December. For playing Jane Tennison in ITV's Prime Suspect, in 2006, the British public ranked her number 29 in ITV's poll of TV's 50 Greatest Stars. In January 2009, Mirren was named on The Times' list of the top 10 British actresses of all time. The list included Julie Andrews, Helena Bonham Carter, Judi Dench, and Audrey Hepburn. In 2021, Mirren was named by the Carnegie Corporation of New York as an honoree of the Great Immigrants Award. She was made a Member of the Order of the Companions of Honour (CH) in the 2026 Birthday Honours for services to drama.

== Bibliography ==
- Mirren, Helen (2011). In the Frame: My Life in Words and Pictures. Simon & Schuster. ISBN 978-1-4165-7341-8.

== See also ==
- List of atheists in film, radio, television and theatre
- List of British actors
- List of Academy Award winners and nominees from Great Britain
- List of actors with Academy Award nominations
- List of actors with more than one Academy Award nomination in the acting categories
- List of Royal National Theatre Company actors
- List of actors in Royal Shakespeare Company productions
- List of Primetime Emmy Award winners
- List of Golden Globe winners
