= Global Ties U.S. =

U.S. nonprofit organization

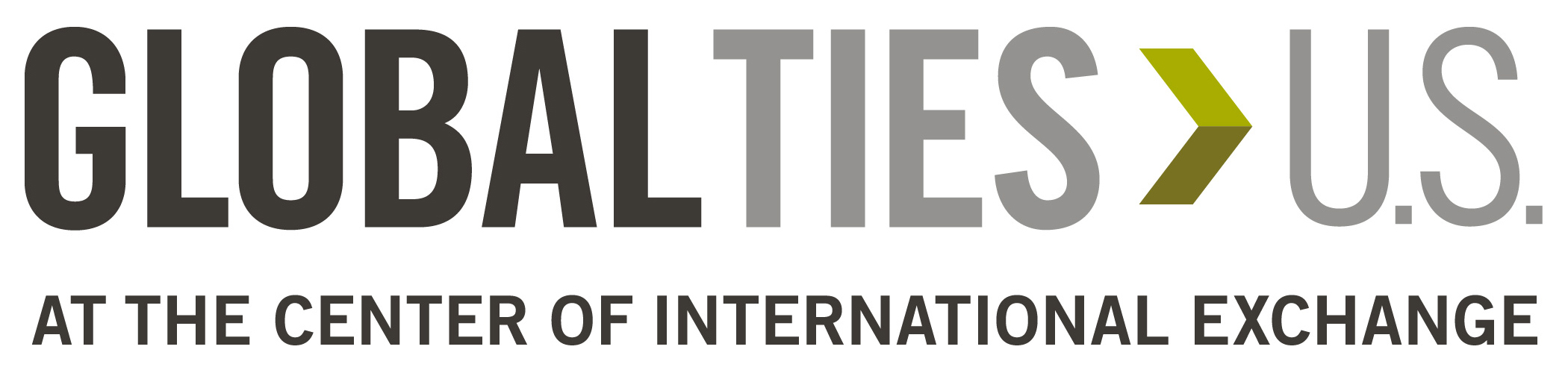
- Global Ties U.S. logo
- Company type: 501(c)(3) non-profit
- Industry: Citizen diplomacy
- Founded: 1961; 65 years ago
- Headquarters: Washington, DC, U.S.
- Number of employees: 21
- Website: globaltiesus.org

Global Ties U.S. is a non-partisan, 501(c)(3) non-profit organization established in 1961 to promote excellence in citizen diplomacy. It is based in Washington, DC, in the United States.

Global Ties U.S. members include international organizations, national program agencies, and more than 100 community-based organizations throughout the United States. Members design and implement professional programs, provide cultural activities, and offer home hospitality opportunities for foreign leaders, specialists, and international scholars participating in the U.S. Department of State's International Visitor Leadership Program and other exchange programs. More than one-third of the community members are staffed by volunteers.

== History ==
=== Founding ===
After World War II the International Visitor Program (IVP) brought in an annually increasing number of foreign visitors to the United States. As it became difficult for the United States Department of State to facilitate the research and logistics of the program, they turned to private sector organizations such as the Institute of International Education (IIE) and the Governmental Affairs Institute (GAI). These national program agencies (NPAs), funded by the Department of State, would work in collaboration with more voluntary, locally established centers for international visitors (CIVs) to map out an itinerary for incoming international visitors.

A number of issues became evident as these private organizations functioned together. The NPAs and CIVs had been working in poor communication and coordination—both among and within themselves—resulting in a stifled exchange of skills and information and therefore programming capacity; and it was not clear as to how those organizations should be funded.

Representatives from relevant organizations held many discussions to address these financial and communicative issues. On February 11, 1957, the Interim Council for Community Services to International Visitors (ICCSIV) was established to help sustain the growth of the IVP and its local organizations. The ICCSIV, whose membership reflected both private and public organizations, served as a sort of Board of Directors to coordinate the efforts between NPAs and CIVs.

Members of the ICCSIV agreed to establish the National Council for Community Services to International Visitors (NCCSIV) on November 30, 1960, a first step toward creating an official organization. NCCSIV adopted the acronym COSERV in April 1961, and officially incorporated as a non-profit organization in 1965. COSERV changed its name to the National Council for International Visitors (NCIV) on October 1, 1979, to reflect its central role as a coordinator for CIVs and other programming agencies for the International Visitor Leadership Program (IVLP). The organization changed its name to Global Ties U.S. in 2014.

=== Nobel Peace Prize nomination ===
Senator Arlen Specter (R-PA) nominated Global Ties U.S. (then NCIV) and its volunteers for the Nobel Peace Prize in 2001.

== Members ==
Global Ties U.S. has over 100 community-based member organizations throughout the United States. The role of these organizations is to organize programs for participants in the IVLP.

== Citizen Diplomat Award ==
Global Ties U.S. distributes numerous awards in recognition of excellent citizen diplomacy, the most well-known of which is its Citizen Diplomat Award. Global Ties U.S. presents the Citizen Diplomat Award to an individual or institution "for outstanding achievements in furthering the cause of international understanding and global engagement".

Past recipients
Year	Recipient	Title
2018	Mohamed Amin Ahmed	Founder of Average Mohamed
2017	Clifton L. Taulbert	CEO, The Freemount Corporation
2016	Seth Goldman	Co-Founder and CEO Emeritus, Honest Tea
2015	Richard C. Morias	Author, The Hundred-Foot Journey
2014	Taharka Brothers Ice Cream Company and De La Sol Haiti	Social Entrepreneurs
2013	Dr. Aaron Shirley	Founder of the HealthConnect program in Jackson, Mississippi, Chairman of the Board for the Jackson Medical Mall Foundation, and co-founder of the Jackson Hinds Comprehensive Health Center
2009	Rick Steves	Author and Founder, Europe Through the Back Door
2008	Garth Fagan	Founder and Artistic Director, Garth Fagan Dance
2007	Keith Reinhard	Founder, President, Business for Diplomatic Action
2000	Richard Stanley	Founder and CEO of the Stanley Foundation
1993	Maya Angelou	Poet and Activist
1990	John Richardson Jr.	Assistant Secretary of State, ECA; Founder, U.S. Institute for Peace
1987	J. William Fulbright	Senator (D-AR)
