= Richard C. Morais =

American novelist

- Born: October 25, 1960 (age 65); Lisbon, Portugal
- Education: Sarah Lawrence College
- Occupations: Novelist; journalist
- Spouse: Susan Agar (m. 1983)

Richard C. Morais (born October 25, 1960) is a Canadian-American novelist and journalist. He is the author of three books, including The Hundred-Foot Journey, which is an international bestseller and has been adapted as a film by DreamWorks.

== Early life ==
Morais, the youngest of four sons, was born in Lisbon, Portugal, to an American mother and Canadian father of Portuguese descent. Morais spent most of his formative years in Switzerland, attending the private British school, Inter-Community School Zürich, and the American International School of Zurich. His mother, a New Yorker, became a Jungian analyst at the C. G. Jung Institute in Zurich.

Morais attended Sarah Lawrence College, graduating in 1981. There he became a Buddhist.

== Career ==
In 1983, Morais married Susan Agar, another Sarah Lawrence College graduate then working at PBS, and they moved to Carroll Gardens, Brooklyn. In 1984, Morais began working as a fact-checker and junior reporter for Forbes. In 1986 the couple moved to London so Morais could work as a Forbes European Correspondent.

A Forbes cover story he wrote in 1986 about the Parisian fashion and business mogul, Pierre Cardin, led to a book contract with Bantam Press. Morais left Forbes in 1988 and moved with his wife to Paris to research the unauthorized biography, Pierre Cardin: The Man Who Became a Label, which was published in the U.K. in 1991. Morais returned to London after his book was published, to become Forbes magazine's European Correspondent, Senior European Correspondent, and, finally, European Bureau Chief. By the time he moved back to America in 2003, he had written many cover stories for Forbes. Having joined Forbes in 1984, Morais left Forbes in 2009 after 25 years.

In 2008, Morais' first novel, The Hundred-Foot Journey, was published by HarperCollins in India. It is based in a town called Lumière, which was based on Agari, a Swiss mountain village Morais had visited as a child. An extended version of the book was published in the U.S. in 2010 by Scribner, and it was named a New York Times "Editors Choice". The book was adapted for film by DreamWorks Pictures and released in August 2014. The film was directed by Lasse Hallström and stars Dame Helen Mirren, Om Puri, Manish Dayal, and Charlotte Le Bon.

In 2013, Scribner published his novel, Buddhaland Brooklyn, a work about a repressed Japanese priest who is sent to Brooklyn to open up a temple.

In 2014 Morais is currently the editor at Barron’s Penta magazine, an American finance magazine's quarterly publication and website serving the information needs of wealthy families.

In 2015 Morais was awarded the Citizen Diplomat of the Year Award from the Global Ties U.S. a Washington, D.C.–based non-partisan 501(c)(3) non-profit organization.

== Works ==
Non-fiction

- Pierre Cardin: The Man Who Became a Label. Bantam (UK). 1991. ISBN 0593018001. Biography.

Novels

- The Hundred-Foot Journey. HarperCollins. 2008. ISBN 8172237952
- Buddhaland Brooklyn. Scribner. 2012. ISBN 1451669224
- The Man with No Borders: A Novel. Little A. 2019. ISBN 154209383X
