= Niesobia coat of arms =

Polish coat of arms

Niesobia
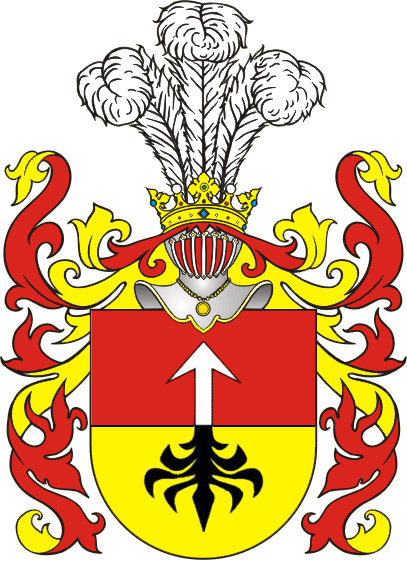
- Alternative names: Krzywosąd, Złodzieje
- Earliest mention: 1424
- Towns: none
- Families: 45 names altogether: Bilanowski, Biskupski, Biskupski Wierzbięta, Doroszewski, Doruchowski, Gąsczyński, Gąszczyński, Gąściński, Gęszczyński, Gubakowski, Kempisty, Kępiński, Kępski, Kępisty, Kierzyński, Kieszczyński, Kompaniec, Krzywosąd, Krzywosądzki, Leczycki, Lędzki, Liwski, Łęczycki, Łęczyński, Mijomski, Miromski, Mironienko, Mironow, Mirowski, Mirski, Niemczyk, Niesobia, Niesobski, Omenta, Omęnta, Omęta, Piekarski, Pieszczafa, Ponęcki, Pryzkint, Pryżgint, Sępiński, Średnicki, Użwencki, Złodziey

Niesobia, is a Polish coat of arms. It was used by several old szlachta families in the times of the Polish–Lithuanian Commonwealth.

== History ==
This coat of arms has its origins in Moravia, in what is today Czech Republic, along with the 45 noble families that bore this coat of arms. The earliest written document mentioning the Niesobia coat of arms dates back to 1424. Some of the families bearing this coat of arms later became incorporated into the Russian nobility.

== Blazon ==
A shield crossed in red and gold, on which is a silver arrow with a black eagle's tail at the end; in the crest are three ostrich feathers on top of the helmet.

== See also ==
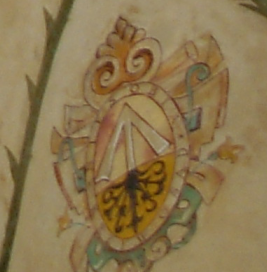
Niesobia coat of arms in Baranów Sandomierski Castle

- Polish heraldry
- Heraldry
- Coat of arms
- Dynastic Genealogy
- Ornatowski.com
- Piekosiński, Franciszek Heraldyka polska wieków średnich
- Polish nobility
- Baranów Sandomierski Castle
- Ruthenian nobility
- Russian nobility
