= Teeth 'n' Smiles =

Play written by David Hare

- Written by: David Hare

Premiere
- Date: 2 September 1975
- Place: Royal Court Theatre, London

Teeth 'n' Smiles is a musical play written by David Hare. It debuted at the Royal Court Theatre in London in 1975 and had four further runs between 1975 and 1979. It was revived in 2002, and then again in 2025 for its 50th anniversary, running from March to June 2026.

== Plot ==
The play is set around the performances of a failing rock band fronted by lead singer Maggie Frisby at the May Ball on the night of 9 June 1969 at Jesus College, Cambridge.

== Music ==
The songs in the play were written by Nick Bicât (music) and Tony Bicât (lyrics) and were:

- "Close to Me"
- "Passing Through"
- "Yeah Yeah Yeah"
- "Bastards"
- "Let's Have a Party"
- "Arthur's Song"
- "Last Orders"

Additionally, Rebecca Lucy Taylor wrote a new song for the West End revival (2026) entitled "Maggie's Song"

== Productions ==
Directed by the author, the play was first performed at the Royal Court Theatre on 2 September 1975.

It was subsequently revived in the West End at Wyndhams Theatre in May 1976, then at Oxford Playhouse in October 1977, Nottingham Playhouse in August 1979 and Sheffield's Crucible Theatre in November 2002.

The play was revived at the Duke of York's Theatre in the West End in 2026, with Rebecca Lucy Taylor in the role of Maggie.

== Cast lists ==
Character	Off-West End	West End	Oxford	Nottingham	Sheffield	West End
Character	1975	1976	1977	1979	2002	2026
Arthur (Songwriter)	Jack Shepherd	Martin Shaw	Frank Grimes	Robert Lloyd	Scott Handy	Michael Fox
Inch (Roadie)	Karl Howman	Karl Howman	Peter Attard	Tom Bowles	Nicolas Tennant	Noah Weatherby
Laura (Publicist)	Cherie Lunghi	Gay Hamilton	Belinda Lang	Gillian Cally	Lucy Briers	Aysha Kala
Nash (Drums)	Rene Augustus	Charlie Grima	Stephen Price	Don Hawkins	Justin Pickett	Bill Caple
Wilson (Keyboards)	Mick Ford	Mick Ford	Kevin Elyot	Ron Emslie	Zubin Varla	Michael Abubakar
Snead (Porter)	Roger Hume	Roland MacLeod	Noel Collins	Keith Taylor	Robert Calvert	Christopher Patrick Nolan / Matt Ray Brown
Peyote (Bass)	Hugh Fraser	Hugh Fraser	David Cardy	Chris Jagger	Keith-Lee Castle	Jojo Macari
Smegs (Guitar)	Andrew Dickson	Andrew Dickson	Larry Whitehurst	Mervyn Stutter	Lance Burman	Samuel Jordan
Anson (Student)	Antony Sher	Antony Sher	Peter Whitman	David Bamber	Dominic Charles-Rouse	Roman Asde
Maggie (Singer)	Helen Mirren	Helen Mirren	Cheryl Kennedy	Linda Marlowe	Amanda Donohoe	Rebecca Lucy Taylor
Saraffian (Manager)	Dave King	Dave King	Patrick O'Connell	Maurice Kaufmann	Ivan Kaye	Phil Daniels
Randolph (Star)	Heinz	Heinz	Tom Wilkinson	Anthony Head	William Maidwell	Joseph Evans

In a 1979 production in the USA, Maggie was played by Ellen Greene.

== Trivia ==
During the initial run at the Royal Court, Keith Moon turned up drunk at the stage door, joined Helen Mirren in her dressing room and told her how great the show was, and then tried to join the cast on stage before being stopped by the management.

Helen Mirren's interpretation of Maggie was based on Janis Joplin. She said of the role at the time: "I’m very like Maggie in many ways, only she’s much more ballsy and gutsy than me. I endorse most of what Maggie says, in fact in many ways it’s difficult to talk about her because I feel so close to her."
