= The Hundred-Foot Journey =

2010 novel by Richard C. Morais

- First edition
- Author: Richard C. Morais
- Language: English
- Genre: Fiction novel
- Publisher: HarperCollins
- Publication date: 2008
- Publication place: United States
- Media type: Print (hardcover)
- Pages: 256 pp
- ISBN: 978-1-43916-564-5

The Hundred-Foot Journey is a novel written by Richard C. Morais and published in 2008. It was adapted into a feature film of the same name in 2014.

== Plot ==
It is a story about how the hundred-foot distance between a new Indian restaurant and a traditional French one represents the gulf between different cultures and desires. It focuses on the rivalry and resolution of the two restaurants and is based in Saint-Antonin-Noble-Val, France. The book is narrated by Hassan Haji, the protagonist of the novel, who is born and raised in his family's Indian restaurant in Mumbai, and it encompasses his journey from child to world-renowned chef.

== Adaptation ==
On June 3, 2013, DreamWorks set Lasse Hallström to direct the film The Hundred-Foot Journey, which was released on August 8, 2014. Steven Spielberg produced the film with Oprah Winfrey and Juliet Blake.
