= Kamiński =

Kamiński or Kaminski (feminine: Kamińska) is a Polish surname. It is the sixth most common surname in Poland (95,816 people in 2009, 94,829 in 2020).

It is related to the following surnames in other languages:

Language	Masculine	Feminine
Polish	Kamiński	Kamińska
Belarusian (Romanization)	Камінскі (Kaminski)	Камінская (Kaminskaya, Kaminskaia, Kaminskaja)
Czech / Slovak	Kaminský	Kaminská
Lithuanian	Kaminskas	Kaminskienė (married); Kaminskaitė (unmarried)
Romanian	Caminschi	
Russian (Romanization)	Каминский (Kaminskiy, Kaminsky)	Каминская (Kaminskaya, Kaminskaia)
Ukrainian (Romanization)	Камінський (Kaminskyi)	Камінська (Kaminska)

== People ==
- Aleksander Kamiński (1903–1978), Polish teacher and soldier
- Anatoliy Kaminski (born 1950), Ukrainian politician
- Anna Kamińska (born 1983), Polish mountain bike orienteer
- Bożena Kamińska (born 1965), Polish politician
- Bronislav Kaminski (1899–1944), Russian Nazi collaborator
- Ester Rachel Kamińska (1870–1925), Polish Jewish actress
- Ewa Kamińska-Eichler (born 1953), Polish sprint canoer
- Franciszek Kamiński (1902–2000), Polish general
- Heinrich Kaminski (1886–1946), German composer
- Heinz Kaminski (1921–2002), German chemical engineer and space researcher
- Ida Kamińska (1899–1980), actress and director, daughter of Ester
- Jakub Kamiński (born 2002), Polish footballer
- Janusz Kamiński (born 1959), Polish cinematographer
- Julia Kamińska (born 1987), Polish actress
- Łukasz Kamiński (born 1973), Polish historian
- Kevin Kaminski (born 1969), Canadian ice hockey player
- Krzysztof Kamiński (born 1990), Polish footballer
- Krzysztof Kamiński (judoka) (born 1963), Polish judoka
- Larry Kaminski (born 1949), American football player
- Marcin Kamiński (born 1992), Polish footballer
- Marcin Kamiński (born 1977), Polish chess player
- Marek Kamiński (born 1964), Polish polar explorer
- Maren Kaminski (born 1979), German politician
- Margot Kaminski (born 1982), American law professor
- Mariusz Kamiński (born 1965), Polish politician
- Mateusz Kamiński (born 1991), Polish canoeist
- Mel Brooks (born Melvin James Kaminsky; 1926), American actor, comedian, film producer, director and screenwriter
- Michał Kamiński (born 1972), Polish politician
- Mik Kaminski (born 1951), British musician
- Moshe Kam (original surname Kamiński) (born 1955), Israeli-American engineer
- Ralph Kaminski (born 1990), Polish singer-songwriter
- Romuald Kamiński (born 1955), Polish Roman Catholic priest
- Shera Danese née Kaminski (born 1949), American actress
- Thomas Kaminski (born 1992), Belgian footballer
- Vincent Kaminski, American energy industry executive
- Waldemar Kaminski (1917–2006), American philanthropist
- Wojciech Kamiński (born 1974), Polish basketball coach
- Wojciech Kamiński (born 2001), Polish footballer
- Zygmunt Kamiński (1933–2010), Polish bishop
- Zygmunt Kamiński (1888–1969), Polish painter

== Fictional characters ==
- Mark Kaminski, in Raw Deal, 1986 movie
- Bernd, Michael and Marco Kaminski in Diese Kaminskis
- Natalia Kamiński in Fate/Zero by Gen Urobuchi
- Manuel Kaminski in the 2003 German novel Me and Kaminski and in the 2015 comedy film Me and Kaminski
