= General Kamensky =

General Kamensky may refer to:

- Mikhail Kamensky (1738–1809), Imperial Russian Army general
- Nikolay Kamensky (1776–1811), Imperial Russian Army General of the Infantry
- Sergei Kamensky (1771–1834), Imperial Russian Army general

== See also ==
- Henryk Ignacy Kamieński (1777–1831), Polish Army brigadier general
- Bronislav Kaminski (1899–1944), Russian-born German Waffen-SS major general
- Franciszek Kamiński (1902–2000), Polish Army major general
