= Kamensky (surname) =

Kamensky is a Russian surname. Notable people with the surname include:

- Aleksandr Kamensky (1922–1992), Russian art critic and art historian
- Jane Kamensky (born 1963), American historian
- Mikhail Kamensky (1738–1809), Russian field marshal
- Nikolay Kamensky (1776–1811), Russian general, son of Mikhail Kamensky
- Sergei Kamensky (1771–1834), Russian general
- Valeri Kamensky (born 1966), Russian hockey player
- Vasily Kamensky (1884–1961), Russian Cubo-futurist poet

== See also ==
- Kaminsky, a surname
