= Kaminsky =

Kaminsky is a surname with various origins. It may be derived from Czech/Slovak Kaminský, Ukrainian: Камінський, Russian: Каминский, Belarusian: Камінскі, or Polish Kamiński. Feminine forms include Kaminská (Czech and Slovak), Kamińska (Polish), Kaminska (Ukrainian), and Kaminskaya (Belarusian and Russian). Its Lithuanian counterpatrt: Kaminskas. "Kaminskis" is a Latvian form; it is also used to transterate "Kaminsky" into Lithuanian.

Notable people with the surname include:

- Adolfo Kaminsky (1925–2023), French WWII resistance fighter and document forger
- Alexander Kaminsky (1829–1897), Russian architect
- Anna Kamińska
- Berta Kaminskaya (1853–1878), Ukrainian Narodnik
- Bohdan Kaminský (pen name of Karel Bušek) (1859–1929), Czech poet and translator
- Bożena Kamińska
- Bronislav Kaminski, (1899–1944), General-Major of Waffen-SS
- Dan Kaminsky (1979–2021), American computer security expert
- David Kaminsky (born 1938), Israeli basketball player
- David Daniel Kaminsky, birth name of American comic Danny Kaye (1911–1987)
- Dina Kaminskaya (1919–2006), Russian-American lawyer and human rights activist
- Ester Rachel Kamińska
- Ewa Kamińska-Eichler
- Frank Kaminsky (born 1993), American basketball player
- Graciela Kaminsky, American economist
- Grigory Kaminsky (1895–1938), Soviet politician
- Ida Kamińska, Polish actress and director
- Ilya Kaminsky (born 1977), Russian-American poet and professor
- James Kaminsky, American editor
- Josef Kaminský (1878–1944), Czechoslovak politician
- Julia Kamińska, Polish film and television actress
- Laura Kaminsky (born 1956), American composer
- Max Kaminsky (ice hockey) (1912–1961), Canadian hockey player
- Max Kaminsky (musician) (1908–1994), American musician
- Melvin Kaminsky, birth name of American comic Mel Brooks (born 1926)
- Patrik Kaminský (born 1978), Slovak footballer
- Rafael Kaminsky, birth name of Rafael Eitan (1929–2004), Israeli general
- Rob Kaminsky (born 1994), American baseball player
- Stuart M. Kaminsky (1934–2009), American mystery author
- Todd Kaminsky (born 1978), American politician, great-nephew of Mel Brooks
- Valiantsina Kaminskaya (born 1987), Belarusian and Ukrainian cross-country skier
- Victoria Kaminskaya (born 1995), Portuguese swimmer
- Walter Kaminsky (born 1941), German chemist
- Yan Kaminsky (born 1971), Russian-American ice hockey player

== Fictional characters ==
- Fedyor Kaminsky, character in the book series Shadow and Bone
- Mikhail "Misha" Kaminsky, character in the anime series Mobile Suit Gundam 0080: War in the Pocket
- Victor F. Kaminsky, Dr., character in the film/novel 2001: A Space Odyssey

== See also ==
- Kamensky (surname)
