= Kaminskas =

- Lithuanian surname
- m.: Kaminskas
- f.: (unmarried): Kaminskaitė
- f.: (married): Kaminskienė
- f.: (short): Kaminskė
- Related names: Polish: Kamiński, Russian: Kaminsky, Latvian: Kaminskis

Kaminskas is a Lithuanian surname. Notable people with the surname include:

- Juozas Kaminskas (1898–1957), Lithuanian painter
- Rim Kaminskas, American aircraft designer, creator of Kaminskas Jungster I and Jungster II
- Birutė Berčiūnaitė-Kaminskienė, Lithuanian Righteous Among the Nations
- Eleonora Kaminskaitė (1951–1986), Lithuanian rower
