= Battle of Batin =

1810 battle in the Russo-Turkish War

- Part of Russo-Turkish War (1806–1812)
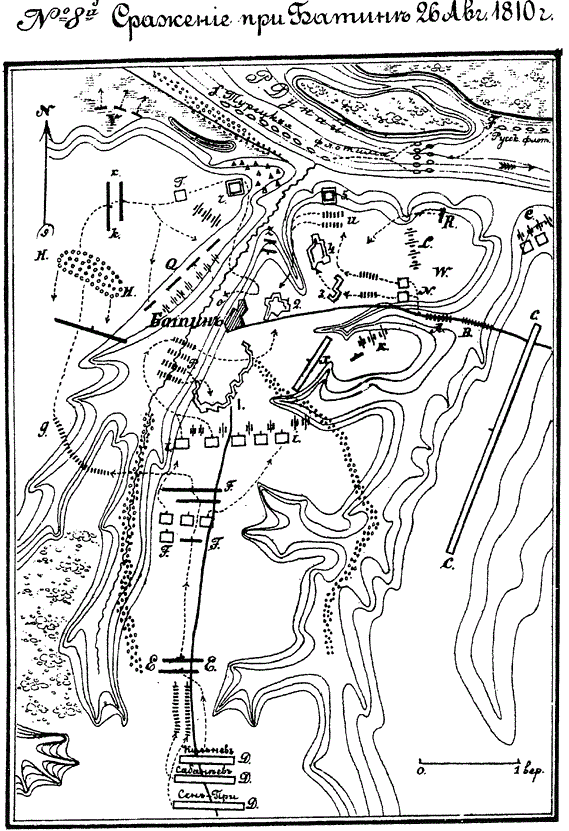
- Battle of Batin on August 26 (O.S.), 1810
Date	9 September 1810
Location	Batin, Ottoman Bulgaria 43°40′N 25°40′E
Result	Russian victory

Belligerents
Russia	Ottoman Empire

Commanders and leaders
Count Nikolay Kamensky	Seraskier of Sofia Muhtar Pasha; Ahmed Pasha

Strength
c. 21,000	c. 40,000: 15,000 Albanians; 6,000–7,000 selected army

Casualties and losses
1,542	5,000 dead and wounded plus 5,086 captured 15,000 inclusive of drowned 14 guns, 178 colours 34,000–35,000 total casualties including non-combat losses

The Battle of Batin (Russian: Батинская битва) took place on 9 September 1810 near the small town of Batin, north Bulgaria during the Russo-Turkish War of 1806 to 1812. The conflict involved an attack by Russian forces on a defensive position held by a numerically stronger Ottoman force. The outcome was a Russian victory which enabled their ongoing Balkan campaign to proceed unhindered.

In this battle, the Russians were led by Nikolay Mikhailovich Kamensky, who by this time had already gained a lot of high command experience by achieving several successes over the Swedish army in the Finnish War. The Ottoman troops were led by the seraskier of Sofia.

== Background ==
The Russo-Turkish wars had been taking place intermittently throughout the second half of the 18th century, interrupted latterly by pressure from Napoleon. In 1810 hostilities were resumed, and the Russians put Count Nikolay Kamensky in command of the Army of the Danube with orders to drive the Ottoman Turks out of the Balkan peninsula.

In June Kamensky crossed the Danube into northern Bulgaria. In August he sent part of his force under General Löwis to capture the town of Razgrad to protect his flank while he besieged the strongly fortified town of Shumen. There he suffered a setback when the Turks counter-attacked, not helped by the fact that Löwis's troops took a wrong road on their return. He therefore left his brother Sergei Kamensky with 30,000 men to control Shumen and led the rest of his army to attack the more important Danubian port of Rustchuk (now Ruse). In the meantime the Ottoman Turks had amassed a strong force in western Bulgaria and were advancing towards them along the south bank of the Danube.

== Battle ==
In early August the advancing Ottoman army, some 40,000 strong (incl. of 15,000 Albanians under Muhtar Pasha and 6–7,000 selected army of three-tug Ahmed Pasha), clashed with Russian troops under General Uvarov who had been sent to delay them. Uvarov retreated before them but to his surprise the Turks halted their advance and dug in. Kamensky contacted his brother at Shumen and ordered him to meet him at Batin with 10,000 of his men and, having left a force to guard Rustchuk, set off with 10,000 of his own men to the rendezvous.

The fighting commenced in earnest on 9 September 1810. Kamensky's men formed columns and made a frontal attack up a slope on the Turkish camp. When the attack stalled Kamensky sent his cavalry round the enemy's right flank to attack the Turkish position from the rear. His brother Sergei had meanwhile slipped round their left flank with his cavalry and also attacked from behind. The confusion allowed the frontal attack to press home causing the Turkish morale to break and many Turks to flee. The camp, its commander and artillery pieces were captured. However Muhtar Pasha, son of the infamous Ali Pasha of Ioannina, managed to escape unharmed with some 4,000 Albanian cavalry.

== Aftermath ==
The Russians had lost some 1,500 men but the Turks had lost 5,000 killed, had 5,000 taken prisoner and suffered the scattering of their army. Kamensky was free to return to Rustchuk to complete the siege and capture of the town. However he was taken irrecoverably ill in February 1811, dying in May, and was temporarily succeeded by Count Louis Alexandre Andrault de Langeron.

== Sources ==
- Petrov, Andrey N. (1887). Война России с Турцией 1806–1812 гг [The war between Russia and Turkey of 1806–1812] (in Russian). Vol. 3. St. Petersburg: Военная Типография.
- Egorshina, O.; Petrova, A. (2023). История русской армии [The history of the Russian Army] (in Russian). Moscow: Edition of the Russian Imperial Library. ISBN 978-5-699-42397-2.
