= Kaminskis =

Kaminskis is a Latvian surname. It corresponds to Polish: Kamiński, Russian: Kaminsky, Lithuanian: Kaminskas. It is also used to transterate "Kaminsky" into Lithuanian. Notable people with the surname include:

- Jānis Kaminskis (1878–1942), Latvian civil engineer and statesman
- Juris Kaminskis (1943–1997), Latvian film and stage actor
