= Battle of Kozludzha =

1774 battle of the Russo-Turkish War (1768–1774)

- Part of the Russo-Turkish War of 1768–1774
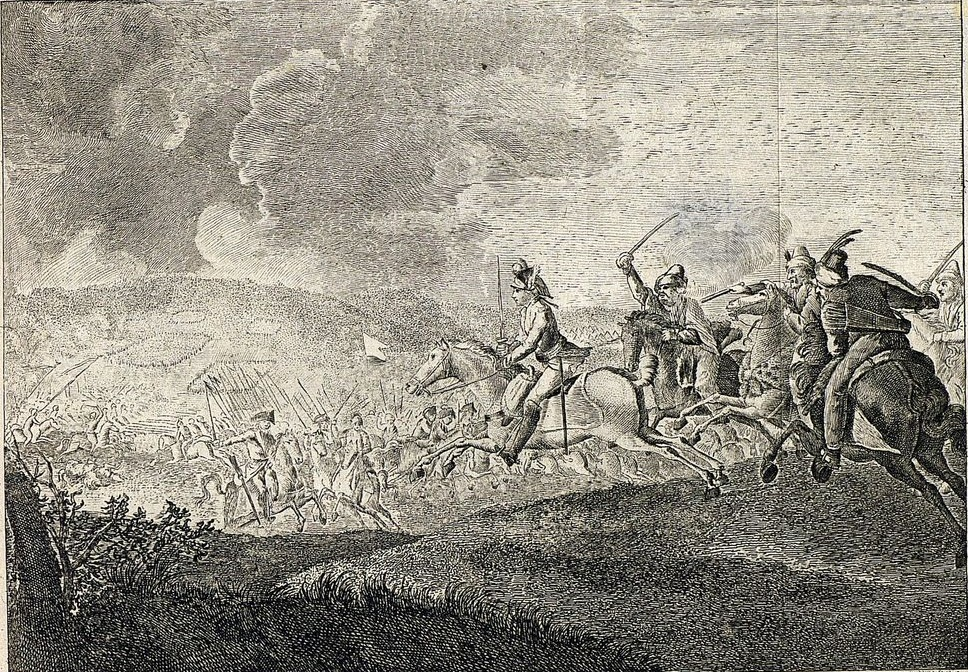
- Battle of Kozludzha by Johann Friedrich Anthing
Date	20 June 1774
Location	near the village of Kozludzha,—now Suvorovo,—Ottoman Bulgaria (part of the Empire) 43°19′45.9″N 27°35′33.91″E
Result	Russian victory
Territorial changes	Treaty of Küçük Kaynarca

Belligerents
Ottoman Empire	Russian Empire

Commanders and leaders
Abdul-Rezak Pasha	Alexander Suvorov; Mikhail Kamensky

Strength
40,000	8,000

Casualties and losses
3,000 29 guns 107 standards	209

The Battle of Kozludzha (also known as the Battle of Kozludža or the Battle of Kozluca), fought on 20 June (Old Style — June 9) 1774 near the village of Kozludzha (now Suvorovo, Bulgaria), was one of the final and decisive battles of the Russo-Turkish War (1768–1774). The Russians managed to rout the Ottoman army, scoring a major victory. This battle, alongside several others in this campaign, established the reputation of the Russian Lieutenant-General Alexander Suvorov as a brilliant commander of his time. As a result of the council, however, the Russians did not undertake a further offensive beyond the Balkan Mountains deep into Ottoman territory due to the bad local roads and the lack of provisions, which were available only until 12 July. The commander-in-chief General-Feldmarshal Pyotr Rumyantsev-Zadunaisky was furious at the operational outcome and placed the responsibility for not moving the TO beyond the Balkan Mountains on Lieutenant-General Count Mikhail Kamensky, Suvorov's assistant at the battle of Kozludzha and the senior among the 6 generals (including Suvorov) who were at the council. Nevertheless, a peace treaty favorable to Russia would soon be signed—owing to the battle.

The Ottoman forces were estimated at 40,000. Russian numbers were much lower, 8,000 men who participated in the battle. All in all, Suvorov had about 19,500 men available. This was his corps (14,000), and part of Kamensky's forces (approximately 5,500 out of 11,000). The Ottoman forces were demoralized due to previous defeats and had poor logistics (including a year of withheld back pay).

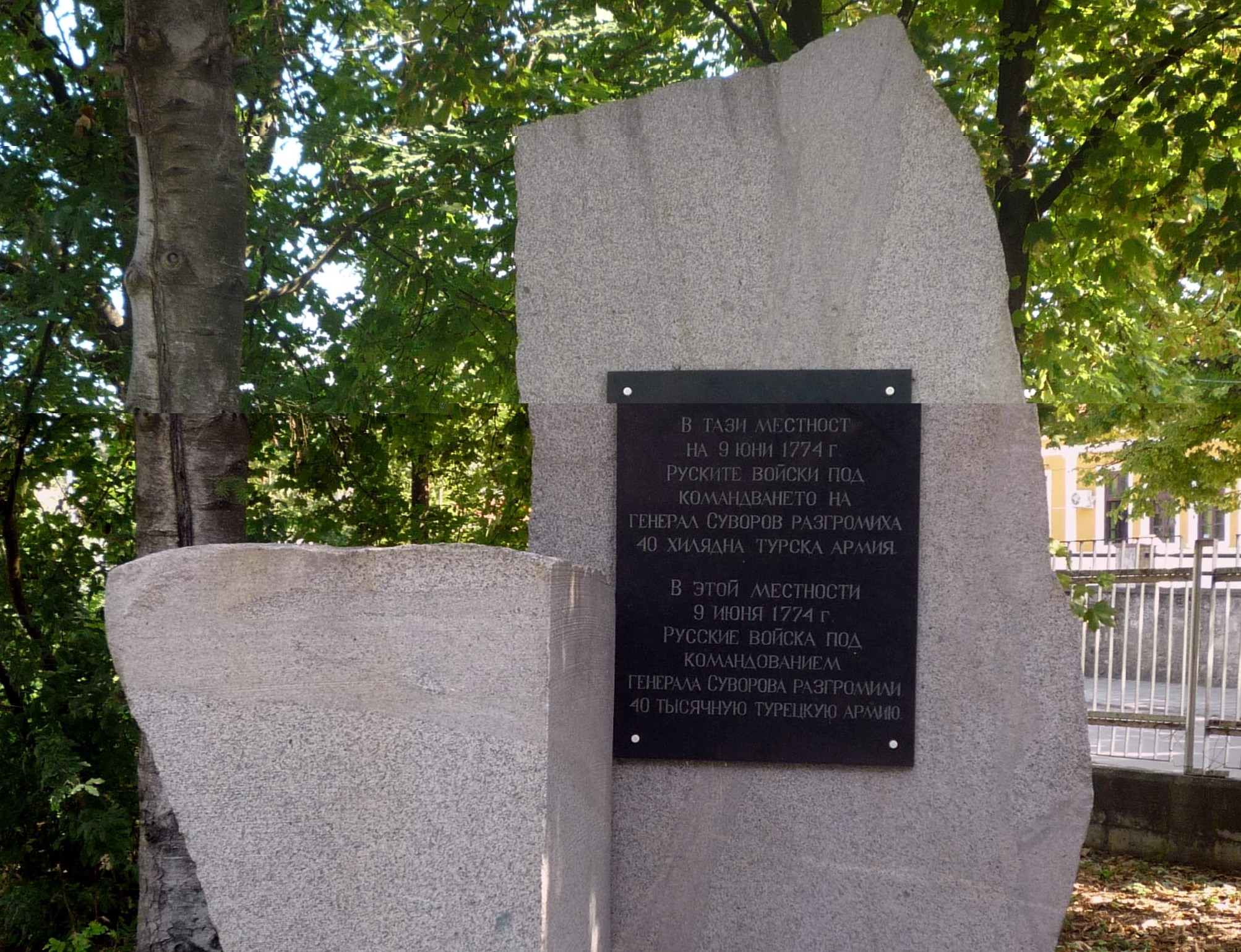
Monument to the battle of Kozludzha in Suvorovo

== Battle ==
The Russian army under Lieutenant-Generals Alexander Suvorov and Mikhail Kamensky encountered the Ottoman forces of Abdürrezzak Pasha. Although Abdürrezzak Pasha was a bureaucrat, he was one of the rare Ottoman statesmen who commanded a large military force. After scouts reported to Suvorov, he immediately ordered the attack. The Russian army, divided into four squares, attacked the Ottomans. Ottoman cavalry charges were repulsed by the Russians, while a Russian cavalry attack from the rear resulted in the capture of all of the Ottoman artillery. Russian artillery fire is also said to have been highly devastating to the Ottoman forces. Casualties were 3,000 for the Ottomans and 209 for the Russians. The Russians captured the Ottoman camp with its supplies, while the Ottomans abandoned Kozludzha and retreated to Shumla/Shumen, where they were soon blockaded, suffering from further defeats and attrition.

== Aftermath ==
The Russian victory was one of the major reasons why a month later, on 21 July, the Ottomans were forced to sign the unfavorable Treaty of Küçük Kaynarca.
