= Ivan Inzov =

Russian general

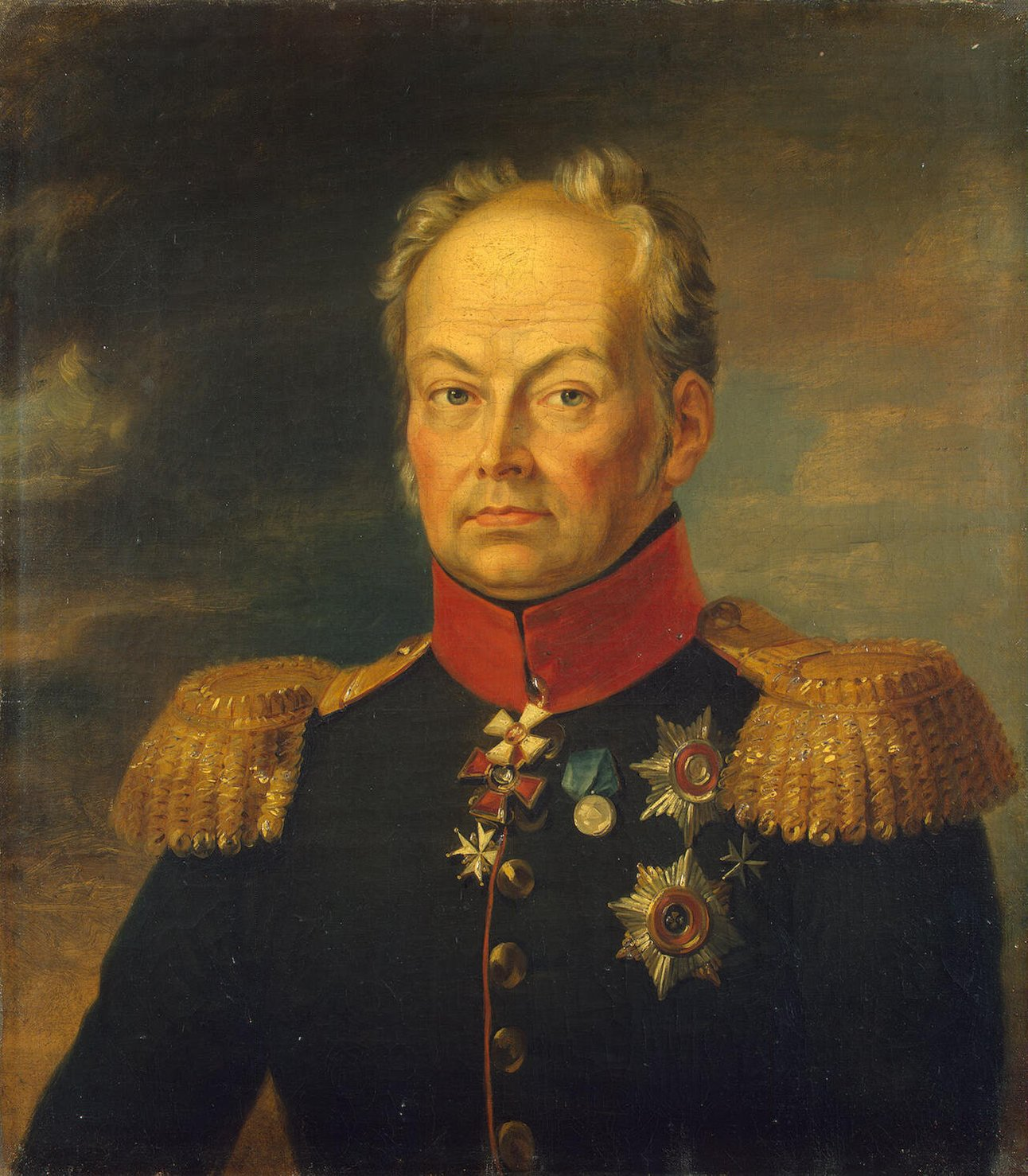
Portrait by George Dawe

Ivan Nikitich Inzov (Russian: Иван Никитич Инзов; 1768–1845) was a Russian General of the Infantry and a commander in the Patriotic War of 1812. Chişinău owes to him some of its most iconic buildings, including the Nativity Cathedral.

Inzov's obscure origin and booming career, in combination with his physical likeness to Grand Duke Konstantin Pavlovich, led some of his contemporaries to suspect that his father was Emperor Paul I of Russia (who was only 14 years his senior). In the early 1820s, Alexander Pushkin was one of his subordinates at Chişinău (then Kishinev). In the words of Henri Troyat, Inzov "looked upon Pushkin as a being set apart, who must be handled carefully". He was buried in a purpose-built mausoleum in Bolhrad, a city he had founded.

He also served as a temporary Governor General of Novorossiia for nearly a year, from July 1822 to May 23, 1823, between Governors General Alexandre Langeron and Mikhail Vorontsov.

== See also ==
- List of Russian commanders in the Patriotic War of 1812

== Notes ==
Government offices
Preceded by Alexandre Langeron	Governor-General of Novorossiya and Viceroy of Bessarabia Region; 1822 – 1823	Succeeded by Mikhail Vorontsov
