= Battle of Piteå =

1809 battle of the Finnish War

- Part of the Finnish War
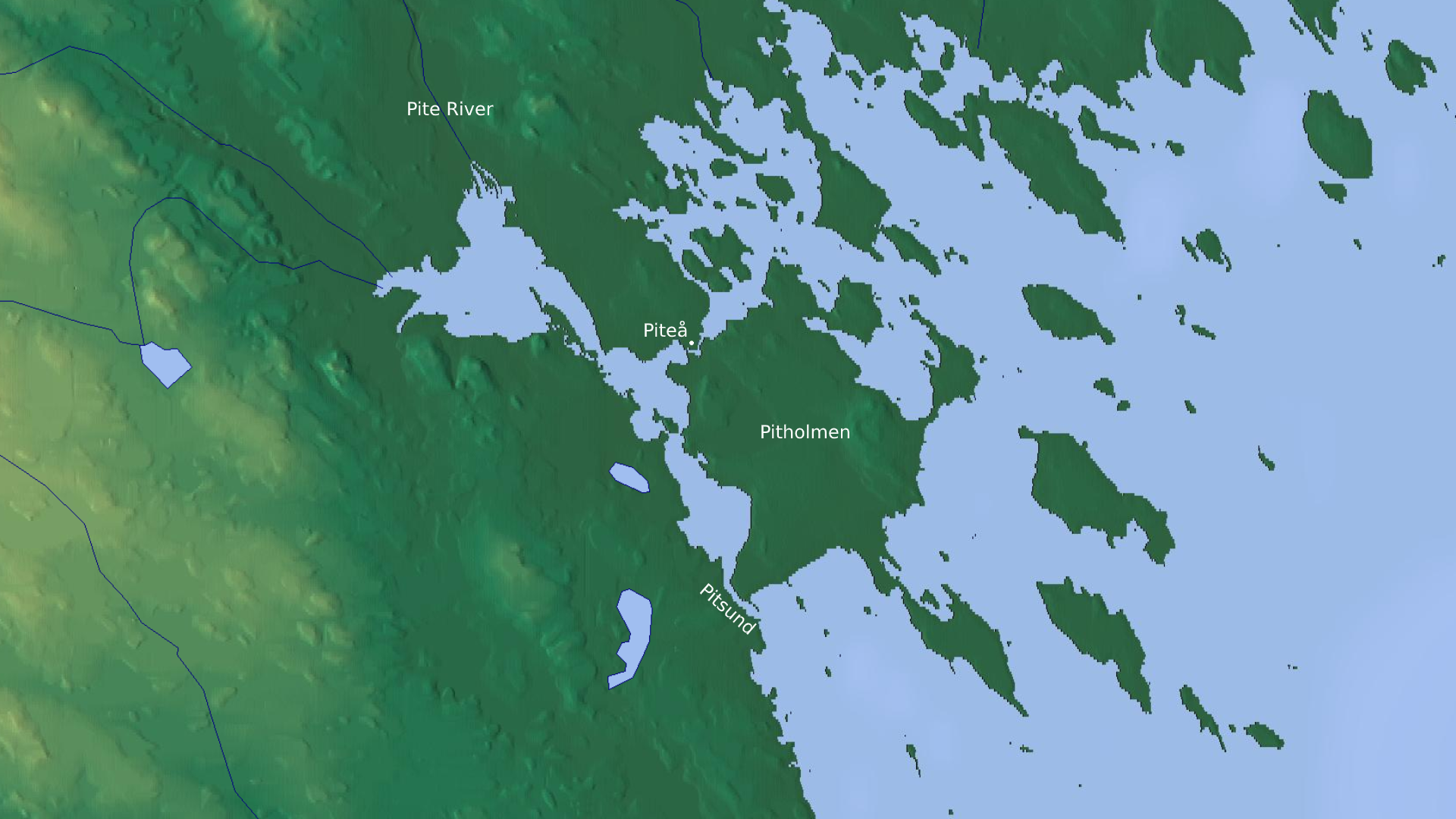
- Locations of the Battle of Piteå
Date	25 August 1809
Location	Piteå, Sweden 65°13′30″N 21°32′45″E
Result	Russian victory

Belligerents
Sweden	Russian Empire

Commanders and leaders
C. F. Hauswolff (WIA) Georg Samuel von Gegerfelt	(Russian Empire) Nikolay Mikhailovich Kamensky

Strength
The frigate Jarramas; 6 cannon sloops	One infantry battalion One unit of cossacks

Casualties and losses
6 killed 19 wounded	13 killed 20 wounded 7 captured

The Battle of Piteå occurred on 25 August 1809, near Piteå, Sweden. A Swedish naval force under the command of Major C.F. von Hauswolff was ordered to cut off the northward retreat of a Russian force under General Nikolay Kamensky which had been defeated by the Swedes five days earlier at Ratan. The Swedish attempt to hem in the Russians was rebuffed as the Russian victory became the last battle which took place on Swedish soil during the war, and remains today the most recent battle to have taken place in Sweden.

== Background ==
On 20 August 1809, the Russian army had been defeated by the Swedes at the village of Ratan, north of Umeå, and had afterwards retired northwards in the direction of Piteå. The Russians were tailed by a naval force of Swedes that had departed from Ratan on 23 August under Major C.F. von Hauswolff, who was the leading officer aboard a Swedish frigate, the Jarramas. This ship, accompanied by six 'cannon sloops', was tasked with the mission of cutting off and trapping the Russian force, by taking up positions on the northern shore of the Pite River near Pitsund, and destroying the bridge that crossed it, thus cutting off the Russians' escape route northwards and forcing them to face the main Swedish force which was still further to the south.

== Battle ==
The Swedish naval squadron, which was also tasked with capturing any Russian vessels which they found sailing northwards, arrived south of Piteå, at the island of Pitholmen on 25 August. The Swedes found stationed on the island a Russian infantry battalion accompanied by some cossacks, under the command of General Nikolay Kamensky.

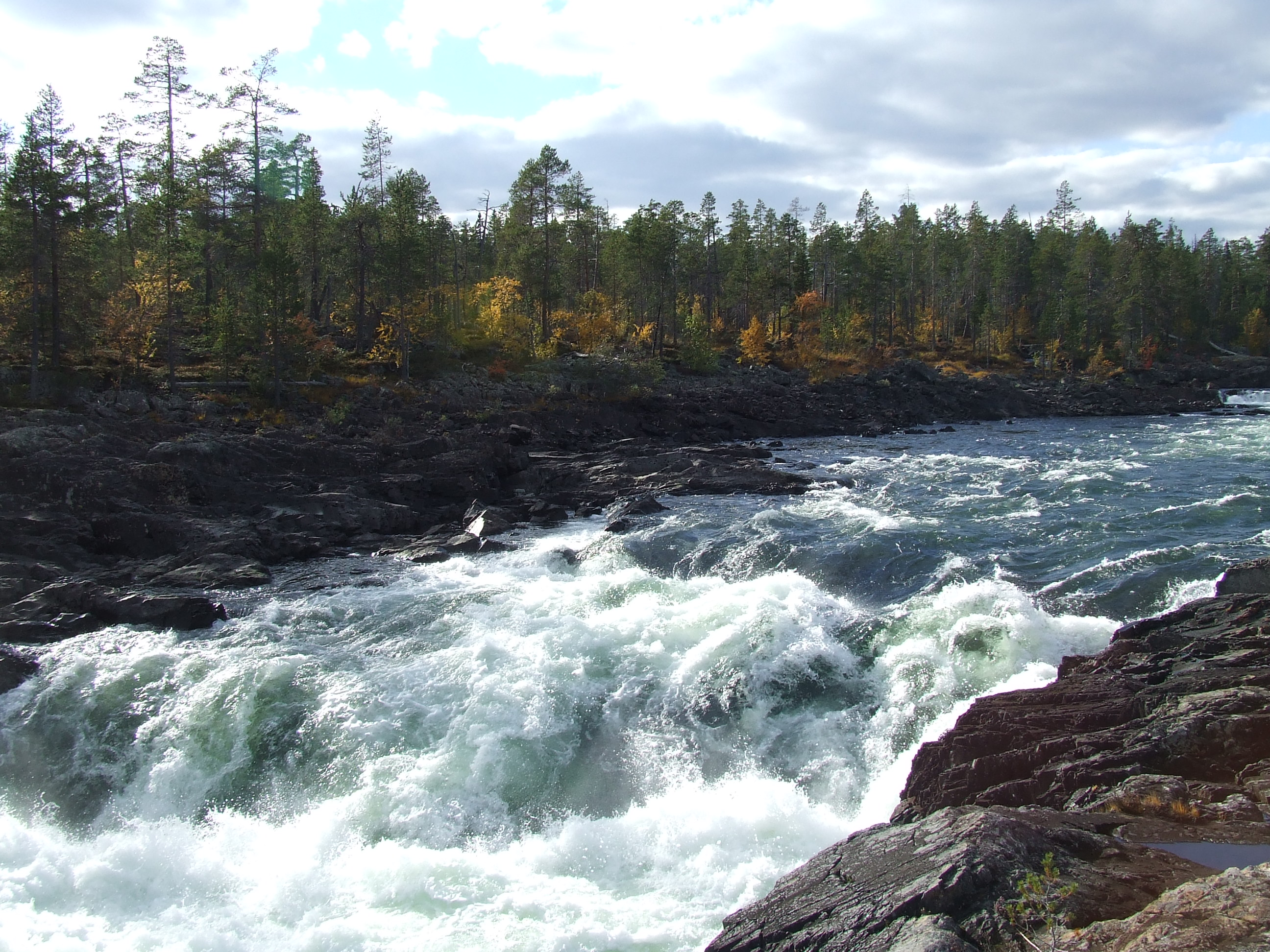
The Pite River

Upon seeing the Swedes, a Russian soldier was ordered to ride quickly on his horse to spread news of their sudden arrival, but was killed by fire from one of the Swedish sloops. The bridge that the Swedes were meant to destroy was clearly visible from the water and it was determined that it could be destroyed easily by a cannonade from the sloops. Major Hauswolff, however, thought it more appropriate to destroy the bridge personally, and resolved to row on a launch in the direction of the bridge. Predictably, he quickly came under fire from the Russian pickets on the beach and was badly injured.

Command fell to Georg Samuel von Gegerfelt, who decided to take the Swedish ships into the narrow strait towards the bridge, but was quickly beset on both sides by Russian infantrymen. A desperate Swedish attempt to reach the bridge was initiated by a Lieutenant Everlöf in particular who advanced under the guard of some sloops, but he and the men accompanying him were shot down by the Russians who had the high ground, and a retreat was deemed necessary. The Swedes quickly determined that a landing would likely not be possible given the strong positioning of the Russian forces, but were still determined to try.

However, the squadron then spotted a force of thirteen Russian transport vessels incoming from the South, intent on resupplying the Russian land forces, so two Swedish sloops were sent out to initiate an attack on the enemy ships. These two vessels were forced to retreat to the Jarramas, however, upon seeing that the transport ships were being escorted by two heavily armed cannon boats. The Swedish squadron quickly retired southwards upon realizing the hopelessness of their situation.

== Aftermath ==
The battle saw six killed and nineteen injured on the Swedish side and thirteen killed, twenty injured, and seven captured on the Russian side, numbers that make clear the limited extent of the Russian victory. The somewhat pyrrhic nature of this victory for the Russians did not, however, prevent them from taking to Piteå and plundering it following the engagement.

In 1999, a commemorative marker was placed upon the site of the battle to recognize its significance as the location of the last engagement of the war on Swedish soil. In 2009, Swedish King Carl XVI Gustaf laid a wreath by the marker, as did the Russian ambassador to Sweden, Alexander Kadakin.
