= Mikhail Semyonovich Vorontsov =

Russian prince and field marshal (1782–1856)

His Serene Highness Prince Mikhail Vorontsov
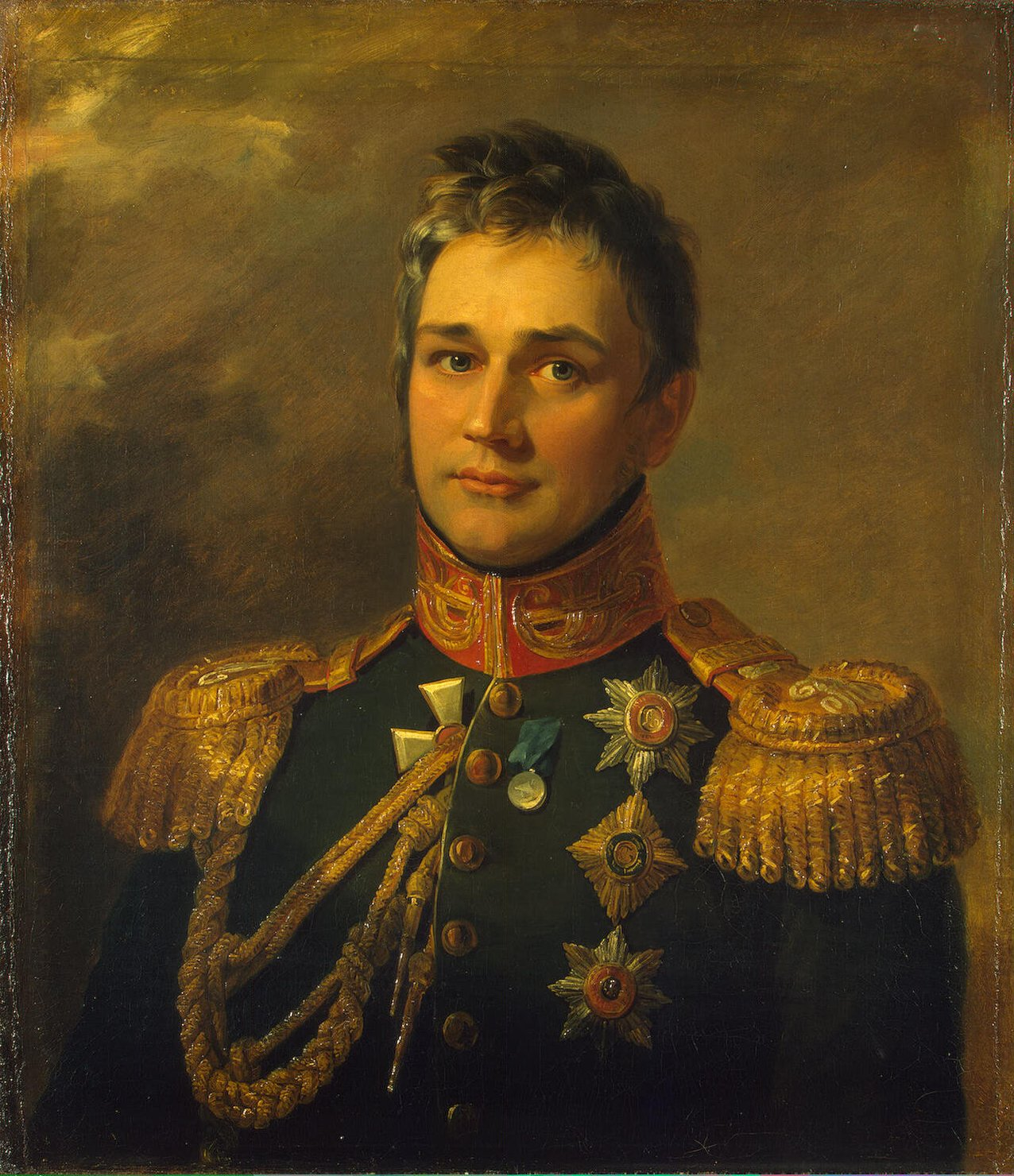
- Portrait by George Dawe, c. 1820

Governor-general of New Russia & Bessarabia
- In office 1823–1854
- Preceded by: Ivan Inzov
- Succeeded by: Fyodor Palen

Viceroy of Caucasus
- In office 1844–1854
- Preceded by: Aleksandr Neidgardt
- Succeeded by: Nikolai Read (acting); Nikolay Muravyov-Karsky

Personal details
- Born: 30 May [O.S. 19 May] 1782 Saint Petersburg, Russian Empire
- Died: 18 November [O.S. 6 November] 1856 (aged 74) Odessa, Russian Empire
- Spouse: Countess Elżbieta Branicka
- Relations: Catherine Herbert, Countess of Pembroke (sister)
- Parents: Semyon Vorontsov (father); Yekaterina Sinyavina (mother)

Military service
- Allegiance: Russia
- Branch/service: Imperial Russian Army
- Years of service: 1803–1856
- Rank: Field marshal
- Commands: 6th Infantry Division; Russian Caucasus Forces
- Battles/wars: Fourth Russo-Persian War; Assault on Ganja; Napoleonic Wars; Battle of Pułtusk; Battle of Friedland; Battle of Smolensk; Battle of Borodino; Battle of Dennewitz; Battle of Dresden; Battle of Leipzig; Battle of Craonne; Battle of Laon; Battle of Paris; Eighth Russo-Turkish War; Ninth Russo-Turkish War; Siege of Varna; Caucasian War; Battle of Dargo; Battle of Salta
- Awards: Order of St. Andrew; Order of St. George; Order of St. Vladimir; Order of Saint Anna

Prince Mikhail Semyonovich Vorontsov (Russian: Михаил Семёнович Воронцов; 30 May [O.S. 19 May] 1782 – 18 November [O.S. 6 November] 1856) was a Russian nobleman and field marshal, renowned for his success in the Napoleonic Wars and most famous for his participation in the Caucasian War from 1844 to 1853.

== Early life ==
Vorontsov was born on 30 May 1782, in Saint Petersburg in the Russian Empire. He was the only son of Ekaterina Alekseevna Seniavina and Count Semyon Vorontsov. Mikail and his sister, Catherine (who later became the wife of George Herbert, 11th Earl of Pembroke), spent their childhood and youth with his father in London, where his father was the Russian Ambassador to Great Britain.

He was the nephew of Imperial Chancellor Alexander Vorontsov, Elizaveta Vorontsova and Princess Dashkova, a friend of Catherine the Great and a conspirator in the coup d'état that deposed Tsar Peter III and put his wife on the throne.

== Career ==
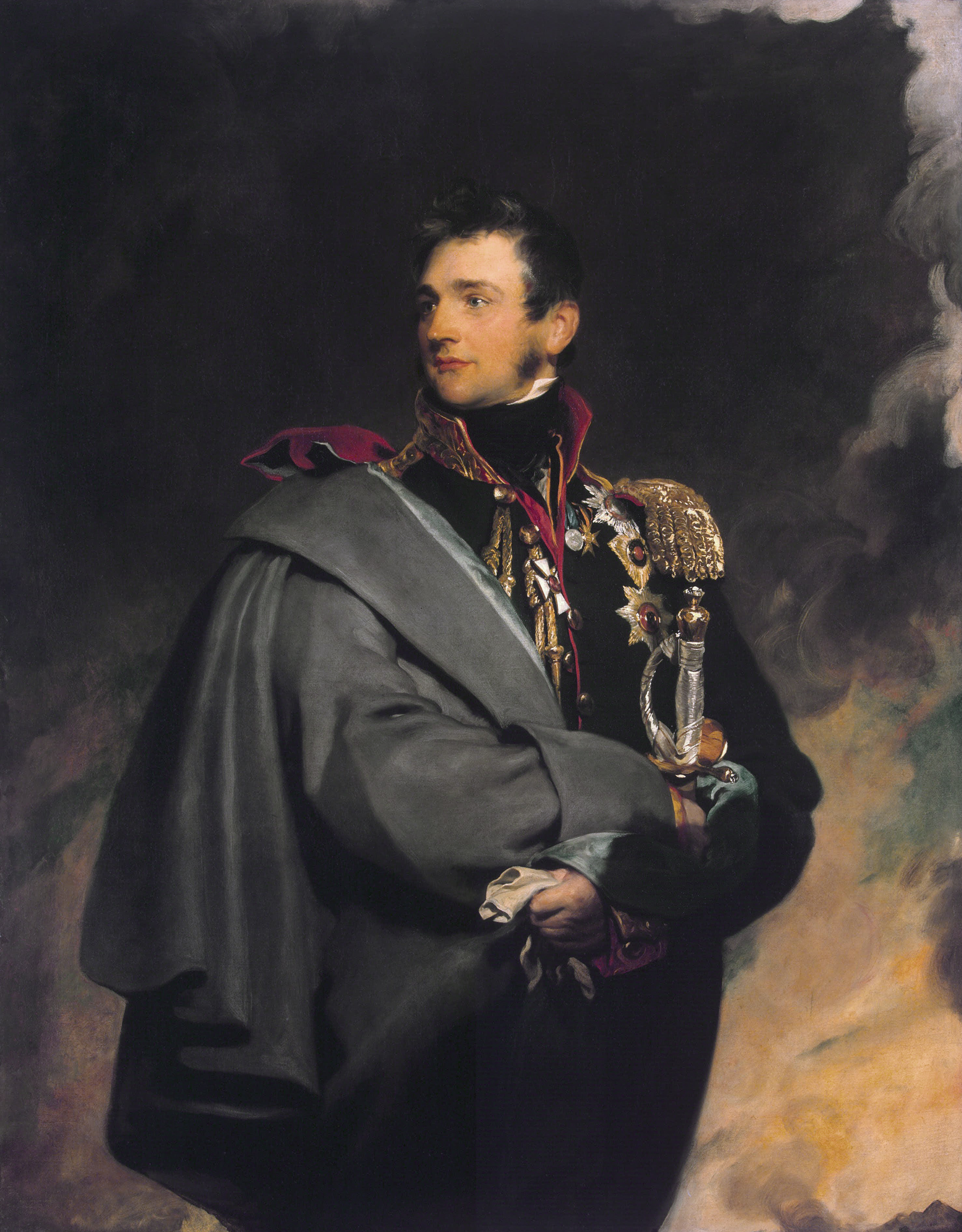
Portrait of Mikhail Vorontsov by Thomas Lawrence, 1821

From 1803 to 1804, he served in the Caucasus under Pavel Tsitsianov and Gulyakov. From 1805 to 1807, he served in the Napoleonic Wars and was present at the battles of Pułtusk and Friedland. From 1809 to 1811 he participated in the Russo-Turkish War.

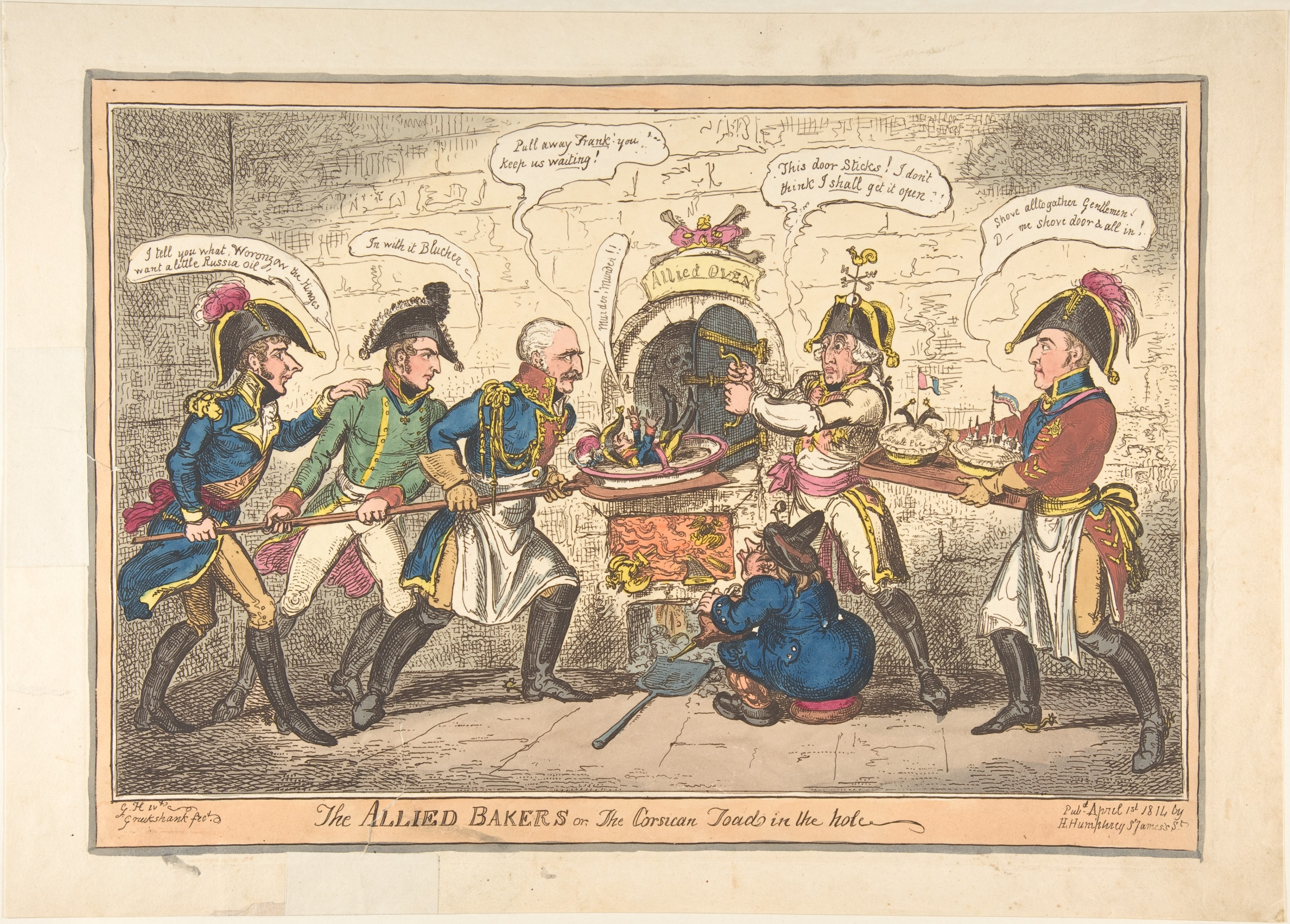
Vorontsov is shown second from the left in George Cruikshank's The Allied Bakers, illustrating the final defeat of Napoleon

He commanded the composite grenadiers division in Prince Petr Bagration's Second Western Army during Napoleon's invasion of Russia in 1812. At the Battle of Borodino, his division was on the front line and was attacked by three French divisions under Marshal Davout. Of the 4,000 men in his division, only 300 survived the battle. Vorontsov was wounded but recovered to rejoin the army in 1813. He commanded a new grenadiers division and fought at the Battle of Dennewitz and the Battle of Leipzig. At the Battle of Craonne, his corps was able to give a fit rebuff to Napoleon, however, the battle ended with the Russian retreat, it is considered "Pyrrhic", but a victory for Napoleon. He was the commander of the corps of occupation in France from 1815 to 1818.

On 7 May 1823, he was appointed governor-general of New Russia, as the southern provinces of the empire were then called, and namestnik of Bessarabia. At the start of the Russo-Turkish War of 1828–1829, Vorontsov succeeded the wounded Menshikov as commander of the forces besieging Varna, which he captured on 28 September 1828. Due to his energetic efforts, the plague, which had broken out in the Ottoman Empire, did not spread into Russia.

In 1844, Vorontsov was appointed commander-in-chief and viceroy of the Caucasus (for military details see Murid War). At the Battle of Dargo (1845), he was nearly defeated and barely fought his way out of the Chechen forest.

By 1848, he had captured two-thirds of Dagestan, and the situation of the Russians in the Caucasus, which had long been almost desperate, was steadily improving. For his campaign against Shamil, and for his difficult march through the dangerous forests of Ichkeria, he was raised to the dignity of prince, with the title of Serene Highness. At the beginning of 1853, Vorontsov was allowed to retire because of his increasing infirmities. He was made a field-marshal in 1856, and died the same year at Odessa. His archives were published, in 40 volumes, by Pyotr Bartenev between 1870 and 1897.

== Personal life ==
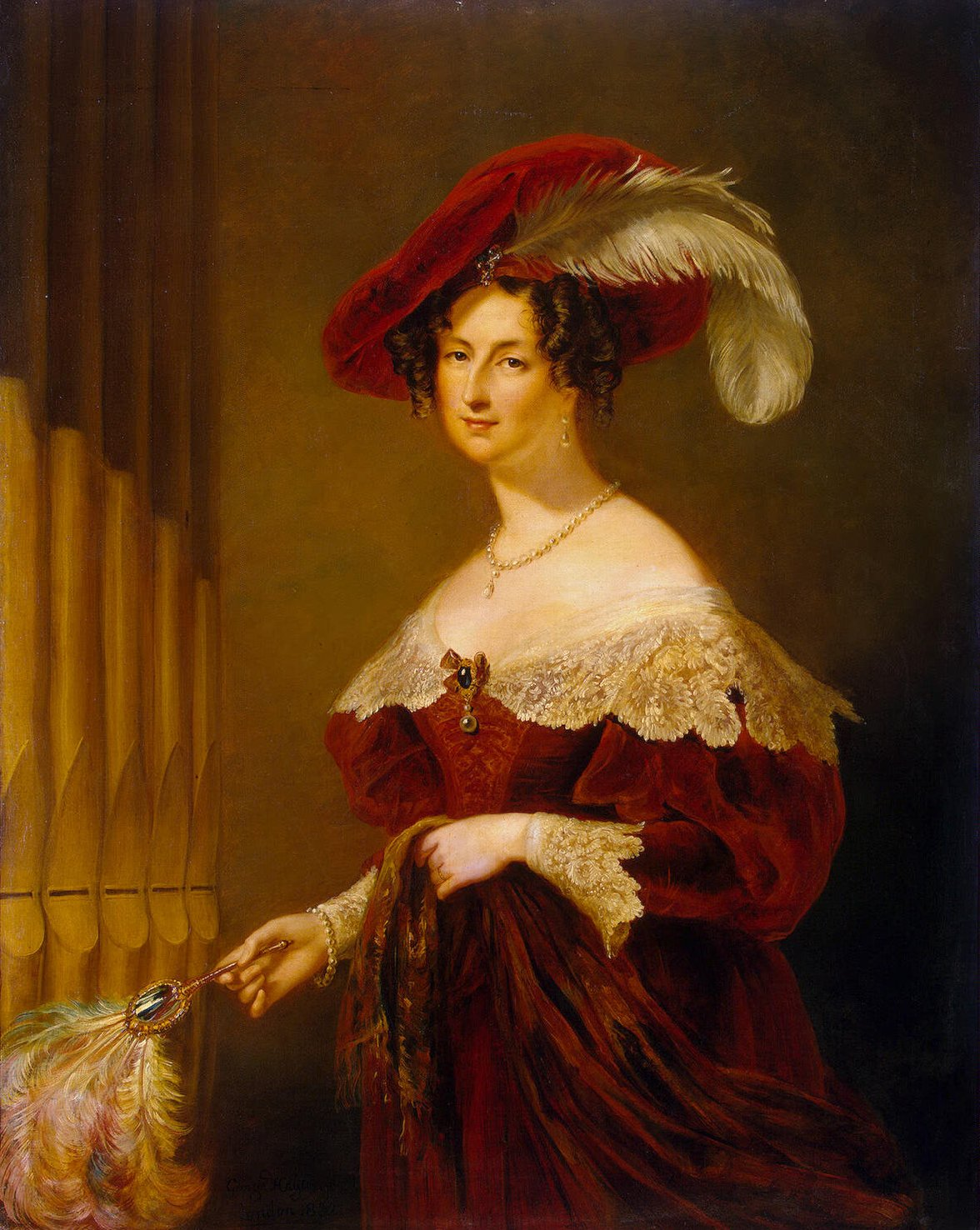
Elizabeth Branicka Vorontsov, by George Hayter

Vorontsov was married to Polish Countess Elżbieta "Elisabeth" Branicka, a daughter of Count Franciszek Ksawery Branicki and Aleksandra von Engelhardt (a member of the powerful Engelhardt family). Her brother was Count Władysław Grzegorz Branicki who married Countess Róża Potocka (daughter of Stanisław Szczęsny Potocki). His wife reportedly had a liaison with Alexander Pushkin during her stay in Odessa, which resulted in some of the finest poems in the Russian language. Together, Mikhail and Elisabeth were the parents of:

- Prince Semyon Mikhailovich Vorontsov (1823–1882), who began construction of Massandra Palace upon his return from the Russo-Turkish War but died before completion; he married, against his parents' wishes, Maria Vasilyevna Stolypina, née Princess Trubetskoy (1819-1895), daughter of Prince Vasily Sergeevich Trubetskoy (1773-1841) and Sophia Andreevna Weiss (1795-1848); widow of Alexei Grigoryevich Stolypin. They married in Alupka on August 26, 1851.
- Princess Sofya Mikhailovna Vorontsova (1825–1879), who married Count Andrey Pavlovich Shuvalov in 1844.

Prince Vorontsov died on 18 November 1856 in Odessa.

=== Descendants ===
As his son died without issue, his grandson through his daughter Sofya, Count Mikhail Andreyevich Shuvalov (1850–1903), inherited the title of Prince Vorontsov. Upon his death, without issue in 1903, the Vorontsov fortune passed to his elder sister, Countess Elizabeth Andreevna Shuvalova (1845–1924), who had married Count Illarion Vorontsov-Dashkov.

=== Legacy ===
Between 1828 and 1848, Vorontsov built Vorontsov Palace as a summer residence for 9 million roubles. The palace is located at the foot of the Crimean Mountains near the town of Alupka in Crimea. Today, it is one of the oldest and largest palaces in Crimea and one of the most popular tourist attractions on Crimea's southern coast. It was designed in a loose interpretation of the English Renaissance revival style by English architect Edward Blore and his assistant William Hunt. The building is a hybrid of several architectural styles, but faithful to none. Among those styles are elements of Scottish Baronial, Indo-Saracenic Revival Architecture, and Gothic Revival architecture. The house stayed in the family until four years after the October Revolution when it was nationalised in 1921 and converted into a museum.

A statue of Vorontsov was unveiled in Odessa in 1863 and later dismantled in 2023.

== Notes ==
Government offices
Preceded by Ivan Inzov as acting Governor-General	Governor-General of Novorossiya and Viceroy of Bessarabia Region; 19 May 1823 – 5 November 1844	Succeeded by Fyodor Palen
Preceded by Aleksandr Neidgardt as High Commissioner of Caucasus	Viceroy of Caucasus; 1844 – 1854	Succeeded by Nikolai Read as acting Viceroy
