= Diese Kaminskis =

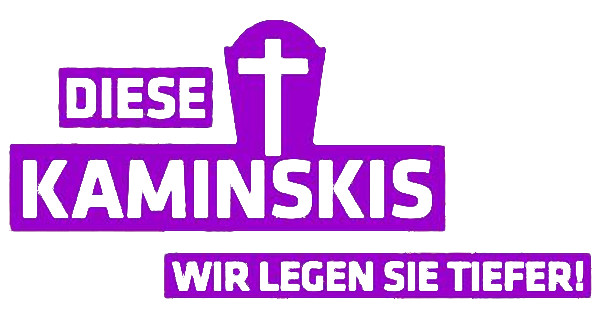
- Genre: Sitcom; Mockumentary
- Written by: Torsten FraundorfSven Nagel
- Directed by: Sven NagelTorsten
- Starring: Peter Bronsema; Nick Hein; Kimberly Michel; David Scheller; Steffen Will
- Composer: Hermann Skibbe
- Country of origin: Germany
- Original language: German
- No. of seasons: 1
- No. of episodes: 7

Production
- Running time: 30 minutes

Original release
- Network: ZDF

Diese Kaminskis is a German television series starring Nick Hein as part of a trio of three incompetent brothers who run a funeral parlour.

== Background ==
The shows premise is a parody of the docu-soaps by television shows. It was broadcast as part of the television program TVLab.

== Storyline ==
The three half-brothers Bernd, Michael and Marco Kaminski are absolute slobs and could not be more different. The nervous Bernd is plagued by neuroses, Michael is shy and naive and Marco is a party-obsessed fool. In addition, Marco's girlfriend Sandy, a tanned not very profound blonde. Together they take over a run-down funeral home in Cologne for lack of alternative job offers. Unfortunately, they are absolute amateurs in this business and get from one disaster to the next, but do not lose their self-confidence and chaotic creativity. Under the motto "Show me someone who doesn't die!" they take care of their clientele more or less reverently.

== Cast ==
- Peter Bronsema - Peter Mettmann
- Nick Hein - Marco Kaminski
- Kimberly Michel - Sandy
- David Scheller - Michael Kaminski
- Steffen Will - Bernd Kaminski

== Episode list ==
No.	Title	Original release date
1	(German: Pilotfilm)	August 24, 2013
2	(German: Der allerletzte Wunsch)	November 5, 2014
3	(German: Sterben und sterben lassen)	November 12, 2014
4	(German: Alte Liebschaften)	November 19, 2014
5	(German: Schlechtes Karma)	November 25, 2014
6	(German: Global Player)	December 3, 2014
7	(German: Man stirbt nur dreimal)	December 10, 2014
