= Waldemar Kaminski =

American philanthropist

Waldemar Kaminski (July 23, 1917 near Albany, New York – June 21, 2006, Buffalo, New York) was a grocer and anonymous philanthropist in Buffalo. After his death, it was revealed that he had anonymously given millions of dollars to Buffalo charities over the years.

Kaminski was a first sergeant in the United States Army from 1941 to 1946, responsible for training new soldiers. He ran a food stand in Broadway Market, Buffalo for more than 50 years.
