= Berta Kaminskaya =

Ukrainian Narodnik (1853–1878)

- Берта Каминская
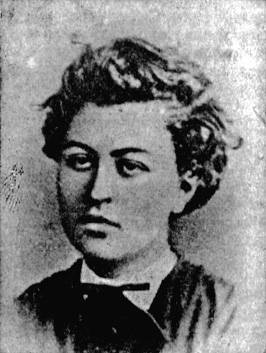
- Kaminskaya in 1877
- Born: 1853; Melitopol, Taurida, Russian Empire
- Died: 1878 (aged 24–25); Melitopol, Taurida, Russian Empire
- Cause of death: Suicide
- Movement: Narodniks

Berta Abramovna Kaminskaya (Russian: Берта Абрамовна Каминская; 1853–1878) was a Ukrainian Jewish Narodnik. Born into a poor family, she left the country to educate herself in medicine, moving to Zürich, where she became involved with the emigrant populist movement. Spurred by a Tsarist decree for women students to return to the Russian Empire, she decided to move to Moscow, where she became involved in agitating factory workers. For her activism, she was arrested and imprisoned, which caused a rapid deterioration in her mental health. Not long after her release, she committed suicide.

== Biography ==
Berta Abramovna Kaminskaya was born in the 1850s, into a poor Ukrainian Jewish family, in Melitopol. Her mother died while she was an infant. Her father - the merchant Abram Kaminsky - encouraged her to pursue an education, although he was himself uneducated and rural Ukraine offered few opportunities to Jewish people. During her childhood, Berta became acquainted with other poor Jews in her neighbourhood, which developed her class consciousness and instilled in her a desire to become a doctor.

At the age of seventeen, in October 1871, she left her family to study in Zürich. At the medical faculty of ETH Zurich, she became fast friends with other emigrant students from the Russian Empire, including Sophia Bardina and Lydia Figner. Initially a follower of Mikhail Bakunin, when Pyotr Lavrov arrived in Zürich in 1873, Kaminskaya began working as a typesetter for Lavrov's journal Vpered! This attracted the attention of the Tsarist government, which was receiving many rumours about the women students of Zürich.

In order to stem the spread of revolutionary and feminist sentiments in emigrant student circles, the Tsarist government ultimately decided to subsidize women's education within its own borders; but it also decreed that women who continued to receive foreign education would be banned from employment in Russia. This decree prompted many of the women students to leave Zürich, with the circle around Sofia Bardina moving to Paris, in order to continue their education at Sorbonne University. Contrary to the Russian state's allegations that the women students were merely seeking male company, the only man that was invited into their circle was the Georgian Socialist Revolutionary Ivan Dzhabadari. These women, Kaminskaya included, competed for the attention of Bardina and often ignored Dzhabadari's points of discussion.

In 1874, the women students were ordered to leave Paris and return to the Russian Empire. They decided to oblige, as they intended to establish a Narodnik women's group in Moscow. There they began agitating among the city's factory workers, among whom they became known as the "Moscow Amazons". Carrying a fake passport, Kaminskaya moved with the rest of her circle to the Russian capital, where she got a job at a textile factory. She initially found the workers disinterested in their revolutionary propaganda, but eventually managed to win their trust and respect, establishing a small populist study group. They also distributed Bakunin's newspaper Rabotnik and held discussions about the international workers' movement, in a campaign of agitation that culminated in a series of strikes in early 1875. This brought them to the attention of their bosses, who reported the women to the Tsarist police. Bardina and Kaminskaya left their jobs and moved into a flat together, where they were soon discovered. Kaminskaya was arrested in her flat on 4 April 1875.

The women were put in solitary confinement, while the authorities prepared for the Trial of the Fifty, the first large-scale show trial in Russian history. The conditions of her confinement caused a rapid deterioration of Kaminskaya's mental health, culminating in a nervous breakdown. She began experiencing hallucinations and paranoid delusions that she had been betrayed by her comrades; she also scribbled messages on walls and was constantly crying and ranting, which unsettled other prisoners and the prison guards. On 11 November 1876, the prison authorities released her into her father's care.

Instead of staying in her father's custody, Kaminskaya went to visit her Narodnik comrade Vera Figner. Kaminskaya was deeply upset by their failure in the factories, which made her lose all hope in any form of collective action, including their propaganda campaigns, meetings and discussions. She informed Figner of her intention to "go to the people" in the countryside, for which she was already learning to make shoes. Although Figner attempted to calm her friend down, Kaminskaya was insistent; together they went to a market to buy her some peasant clothing. Kaminskaya then wandered, without any food, literature or any plan of where to go or what to do. The next day, she arrived back at Figner's house in a disorientated state, apparently turning back after finding a large river that she could not cross.

After recovering somewhat, she moved to Kharkiv, but was unable to find work or lodgings, forcing her to return to Melitopol to stay with her father. In 1878, Kaminskaya committed suicide.

== Bibliography ==
- Porter, Cathy (1976). "Into Exile". Fathers and Daughters: Russian Women in Revolution. London: Virago Press. pp. 116–174. ISBN 0-704-32802-X. OCLC 2288139.
- Shilov, A. A.; Karnaukhova, M. G., eds. (1930). "Каминская, Берта (Бети) Абрамовна" [Kaminskaya, Berta (Beti) Abramovna]. Деятели революционного движения в России (in Russian). Vol. 2. Moscow: Society of Former Political Prisoners and Exiled Settlers. pp. 537–538. OCLC 749336544.
