= Vincent Kaminski =

Vincent Julian Kaminski was born in Poland and is currently a professor in the Practice of Energy Management at Jones Graduate School of Business of Rice University. He the author of several books on risk management and energy trading.

He worked as the head of the quantitative modelling group at Enron from 1992 until 2002. In this capacity he led a team of approximately fifty analysts who developed quantitative models to support energy trading. In the months preceding Enron's bankruptcy Kaminski repeatedly raised strong objections to the financial practices of Enron's Chief Financial Officer, Andrew Fastow, designed to fraudulently conceal the company's burgeoning debt.

The primary practice involved hiding Enron's debt in partnership companies managed by Fastow and financed by outside creditors. The debt was then secured against stock in the Enron Corporation itself, which was strongly valued at that time. To induce creditors to assume the risk of financing this debt certain "trigger events" were built into the contracts which would require immediate repayment of the full loan amount, such as the decline of the stock value used as collateral below a prearranged level. During the course of a company-wide comprehensive risk assessment, Kaminski and his team of analysts pointed out that there existed many such arrangements, and if one were triggered the rest would be activated like dominoes as the stock price fell in response to the bad news, effectively ending the financial viability of the company. Kaminski's strident opposition to these practices was one of the last chances to avert the implosion which soon followed.

Dr. Kaminski holds an M.S. degree in International Economics and a Ph.D. degree in Mathematical Economics from the Main School of Planning and Statistics in Warsaw (which has since been renamed Warsaw School of Economics), and an MBA from Fordham University in New York City.

== Publications ==
=== Books ===
Energy Modelling: Advances in the Management of Uncertainty, published by Risk Books in 2005, ISBN 1-904339-42-5

Managing Energy Price Risk: The New Challenges and Solutions, published by Risk Books in 2004, ISBN 1-904339-19-0

Energy Markets http://riskbooks.com/energy-markets, published by Risk Books on 18 January 2013, ISBN 9781906348793
