= James Kaminsky =

American editor

- Education: Boston University

James Kaminsky was the former editorial director at Maxim Magazine until March 2009. He was also the former editor of Playboy Magazine and Men's Journal.

During Kaminsky's time at Playboy Magazine he pushed directly for the hottest Hollywood stars to grace the contents and cover of the magazine. He oversaw a sweeping redesign of the magazine to make it more accessible to younger readers, and presided over the publication's 50th anniversary issue and events. He became Vice President of Special Projects in 2004.

Kaminsky graduated from Boston University.
