= Kaminskas Jungster II =

American parasol wing homebuilt aircraft

Jungster II

General information
- Type: Homebuilt aircraft
- National origin: United States
- Designer: Rim Kaminskas

History
- First flight: March 1966
- Developed from: Kaminskas Jungster I

The Jungster II is a parasol wing homebuilt aircraft. Designed by Rim Kaminskas, it first flew in March 1966.

== Design and development ==
The Jungster II is a parasol version based on the previous Jungster I biplane design, which itself was a scaled down version of the Bücker Bü 133 biplane. Plans are distributed by Howard Allmon.

The aircraft is a single-seat, open cockpit, strut-braced, parasol wing design with conventional landing gear. The airframe can accommodate engines ranging from 85 to 180 hp (63 to 134 kW). The fuselage is constructed of 7/8 x 7/8 wood truss with aircraft fabric covering. The wing has a slight rearward sweep.

== Specifications (Jungster II) ==
Data from Plane & Pilot

General characteristics

- Length: 16 ft 11 in (5.16 m)
- Wingspan: 22 ft 4 in (6.81 m)
- Wing area: 80 sq ft (7.4 m^{2})
- Airfoil: NACA 2412
- Empty weight: 739 lb (335 kg)
- Gross weight: 1,375 lb (624 kg)
- Fuel capacity: 16 U.S. gallons (61 L; 13 imp gal)
- Propellers: 2-bladed

Performance

- Maximum speed: 150 kn (170 mph, 270 km/h)
- Cruise speed: 129 kn (148 mph, 238 km/h)
- Rate of climb: 3,500 ft/min (18 m/s)

== See also ==
- Kaminskas Jungster I
- Ace Baby Ace
