= Kaminskas Jungster I =

General information
- Type: Homebuilt aircraft
- National origin: United States
- Designer: Rim Kaminskas

History
- First flight: 1962
- Variant: Kaminskas Jungster II

The Kaminskas Jungster I aka Papoose RK-1 Jungmeister I is a single-seat homebuilt biplane.

== Development ==
The Jungster I is a single-engine, single-seat biplane with conventional landing gear. It was intended to be an 80 percent scale replica of the Bücker Bü 133 for homebuilt construction. The wings are swept back an additional two degrees from the Jungmeister. The fuselage uses wood trusses and the wings use spruce wood spars with fabric covering.

Rights to the Jungster I were sold to Kate & Stan McLeod (K & S). The plans are distributed by Howard Allmon.

== Variants ==
Kaminskas Jungster II
A parasol version based on the Jungster I

== Specifications (Kaminskas Jungster I) ==
Data from Jane's All the World's Aircraft 1967–68

General characteristics

- Crew: one
- Length: 16 ft 0 in (4.88 m)
- Wingspan: 16 ft 8 in (5.08 m)
- Wing area: 80 sq ft (7.4 m^{2})
- Aspect ratio: 6.25:1
- Airfoil: NACA 4413
- Empty weight: 606 lb (275 kg)
- Gross weight: 850 lb (386 kg) (aerobatic)
- Max takeoff weight: 1,000 lb (454 kg)
- Powerplant: 1 × Lycoming O-235-C air-cooled four-cylinder horizontally-opposed piston, 100 hp (75 kW)
- Propellers: 2-bladed McCauley fixed pitch, 5 ft 8 in (1.73 m) diameter

Performance

- Maximum speed: 110 kn (130 mph, 210 km/h)
- Cruise speed: 100 kn (120 mph, 190 km/h)
- Stall speed: 43 kn (50 mph, 80 km/h)
- Range: 170 nmi (200 mi, 320 km)
- Service ceiling: 13,000 ft (4,000 m)
- Rate of climb: 1,500 ft/min (7.6 m/s)

== See also ==
Related development

- Kaminskas Jungster II

Aircraft of comparable role, configuration, and era

- Bücker Bü 133
