= Nikolay Kamensky =

Russian military commander (1776–1811)

Count Nikolay Mikhailovich Kamensky
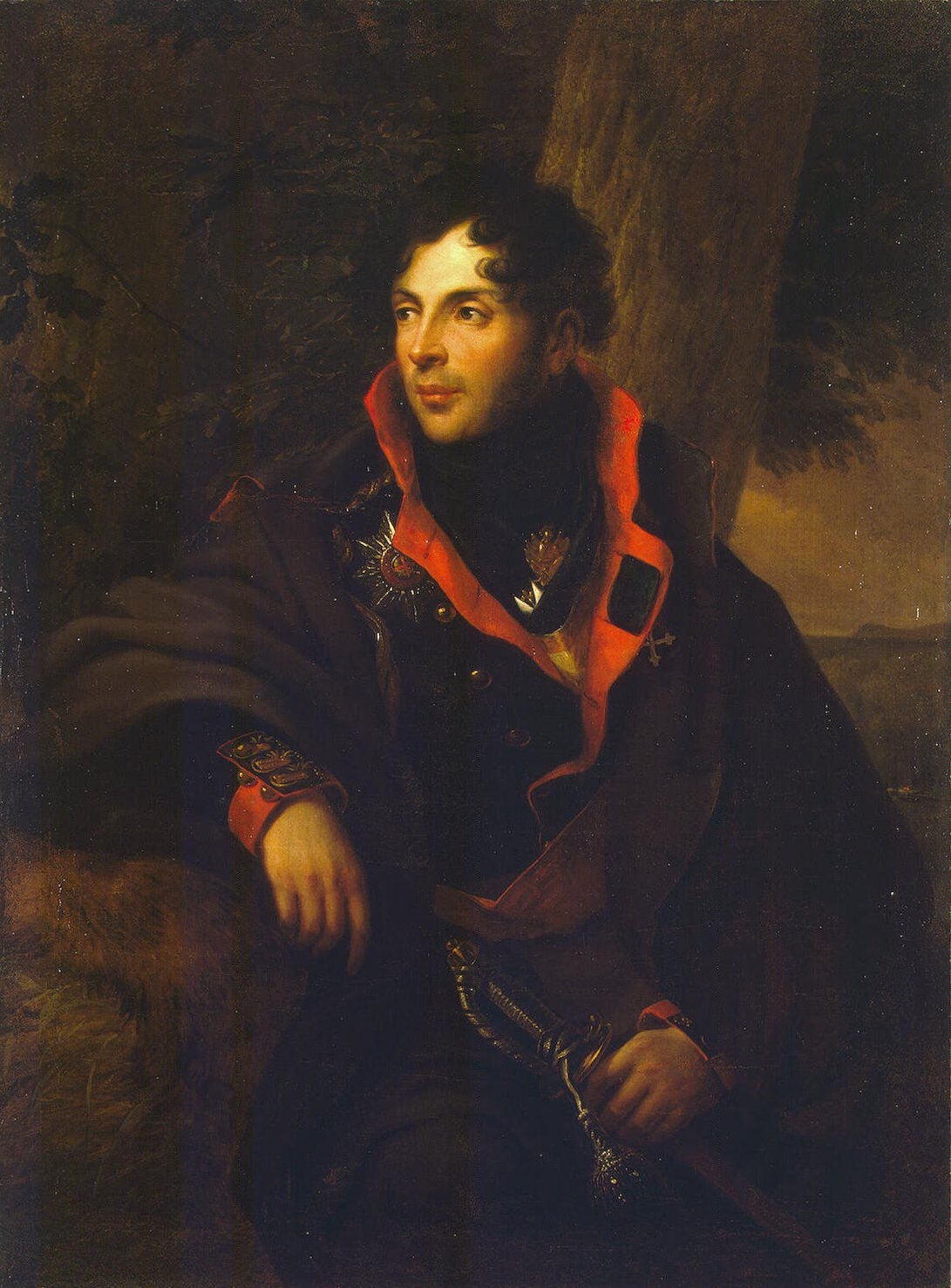
- Portrait of Nikolay Mikhailovich Kamensky by Friedrich Georg Weitsch (Hermitage Museum collection)
- Born: 27 December 1776
- Died: 4 May 1811 (aged 34); Odessa, Russian Empire (today Odesa, Ukraine)
- Relatives: Mikhail Kamensky (father); Sergei Kamensky (brother); Helen Mirren (relation); Tania Mallet (relation)
- Military career
- Allegiance: Russian Empire
- Branch: Imperial Russian Army
- Service years: 1787–1811
- Rank: General of the Infantry
- Conflicts: Expand list: Seventh Russo-Turkish War; French Revolutionary Wars; Suvorov's Swiss campaign; Battles at the Saint-Gotthard; Battle of Devil's Bridge; Battle of the Muottental; War of the Third Coalition; Battle of Austerlitz; War of the Fourth Coalition; Battle of Bergfriede; Battle of Preussisch Eylau; Siege of Danzig; Battle of Heilsberg; Finnish War; Battle of Ruona–Salmi; Battle of Oravais; Västerbotten Expedition; Battle of Sävar; Battle of Ratan; Battle of Piteå; Eighth Russo-Turkish War; Capture of Silistra; Storming of Shumen; Storming of Rusçuk; Battle of Batin
- Awards: Order of St. Andrew; Order of St. George; Order of St. Vladimir

Count Nikolay Mikhailovich Kamensky (Russian: Николай Михайлович Каменский; 27 December 1776 – 4 May 1811) was a Russian general, younger son of Field Marshal Count Mikhail Fedotovich Kamensky and his wife, Princess Anna Pavlovna Shcherbatova (1749-1826).

== Life and career ==
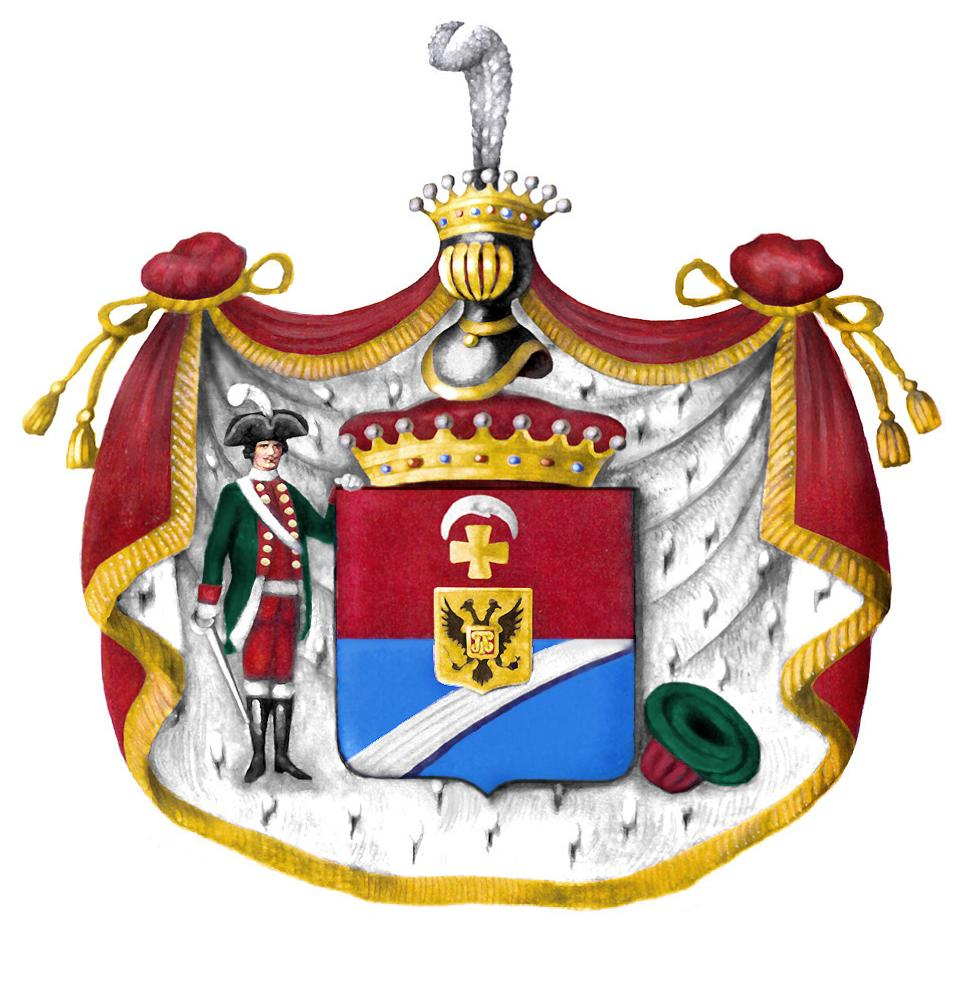
Coat of arms of the Counts Kamensky

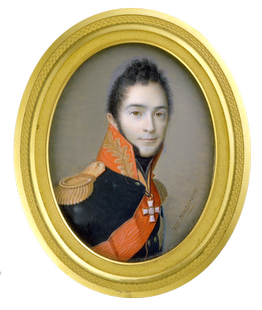
Portrait of Nikolay Kamensky by Ivan Gavrilovich Grigoriev (1810s)

As most of the boys born into the Russian nobility, Nikolay and his elder brother Sergei were educated at a cadet school. In 1787, he was appointed Aide-de-camp to his father. He participated in the Russo-Turkish War of 1787–1792. French count Louis Langeron, who fought on the Russian Army during this conflict, wrote in his memoirs about Kamensky's behavior during the war. According to him, after being upset by a storm that affected his army, Kamensky took all the Tatar prisoners his army had captured and beheaded them. Later, a Jewish person was tied naked to a post and cold water was sprayed on him, leaving him to freeze to death. Kamensky would later have burned down an entire village and left its inhabitants in the snow to die of cold and hunger, then taking all the surviving animals with his army.

Emperor Paul promoted him to Major General in 1799, the year when Kamensky chose to join Suvorov during the Swiss Campaign against Napoleon.

In the Battle of Austerlitz Kamensky, subordinate to Peter Bagration, lost 1,600 men and barely managed to escape alive. He distinguished himself at Eylau, for which he received the Order of Saint George. Thereupon he was sent with 8,000 soldiers to relieve the siege of Danzig but failed in his objective, losing as many as 1,500 men in the process. The following Battle of Heilsberg cost the lives of 1,700 soldiers under his command.

By the time the Finnish War—the most brilliant campaign of his career—broke out in 1808, Kamensky had a reputation for being reckless with his soldiers' lives. However, he was promoted to Full General in 1809 and achieved important successes against the Swedes at Kuortane and Oravais. It was he who came up with a daring plan of the Russian infantry's crossing the frozen Gulf of Bothnia from Finland towards Umeå and Åland, which forced Sweden to cede Finland to Tsar Alexander.

The war in the north over, Kamensky succeeded Bagration in charge of the Danube Army, which operated against the Turks in the Russo-Turkish War (1806–1812). Accompanied by his elder brother, Kamensky captured Silistra and, with his help, Bazargic but failed to take by storming Shumen and Rousse (Rusçuk). They together roundly defeated a 40,000-strong Turkish force of the Serasker of Sofia at the Battle of Batin on 9 September 1810. The Russians lost only 1,500 men, compared with losses of 10,000 for their opponents.

On 4 February 1811, Kamensky caught fever and was transported to Odessa for convalescence, leaving Louis Alexandre Andrault de Langeron in command. He died three months later, aged 34, unmarried and without any known children. Kamensky is related to British actresses Helen Mirren, DBE and her cousin, Tania Mallet, one of the Bond girls, whose great-great-great-grandfather was his elder brother, Count Sergei Mikhailovich Kamensky.
