= Bożena Kamińska =

Polish politician

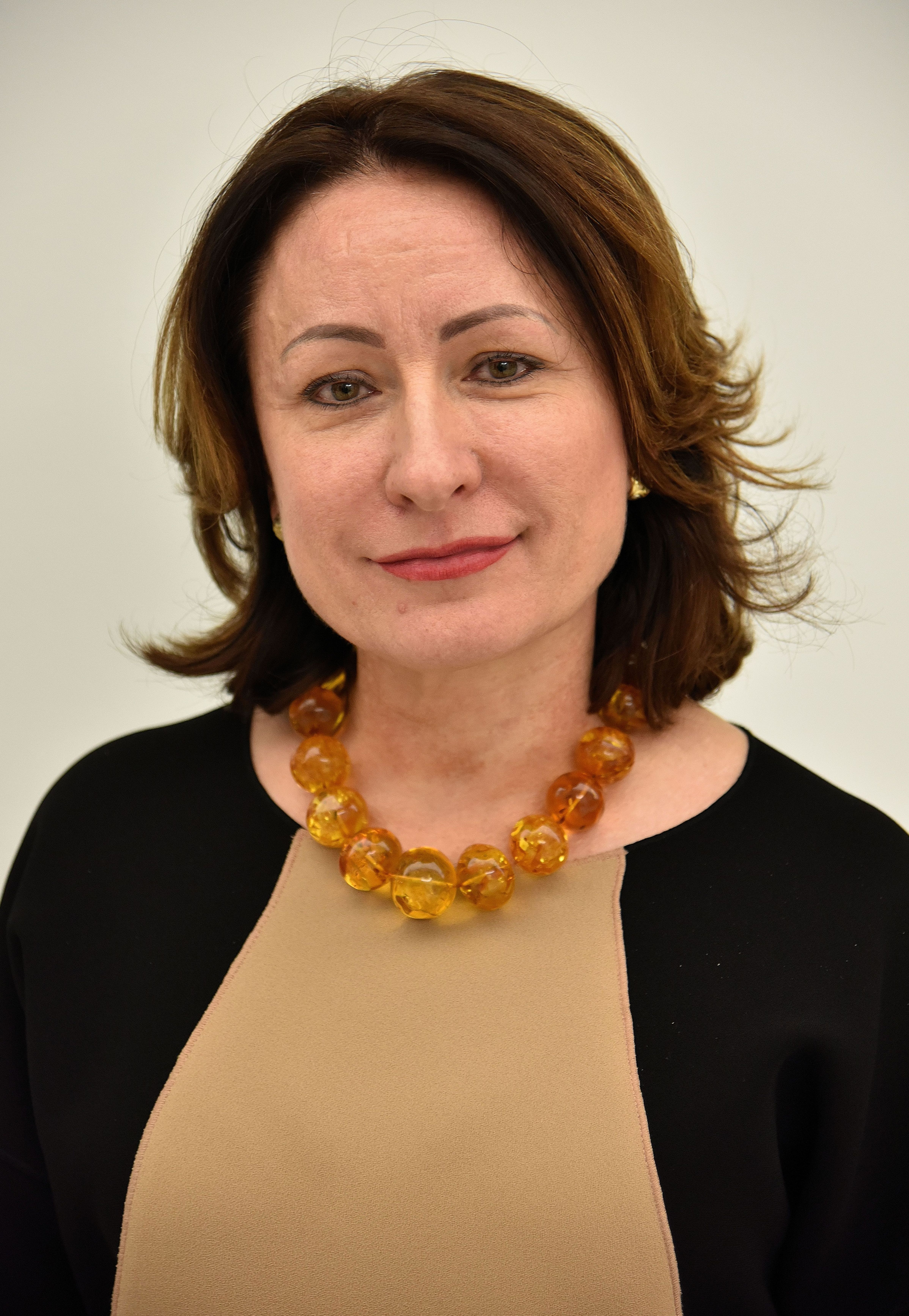

Member of the Sejm
- In office 2011–2019

Personal details
- Born: 1965 (age 60–61) Gołdap
- Party: Civic Platform

Bożena Kamińska (born 1965) is a Polish politician. She was elected to the Sejm in 2011 and 2015. She ran in 2019, but was not reelected.
