= Louis Alexandre Andrault de Langeron =

French general (1763–1831)

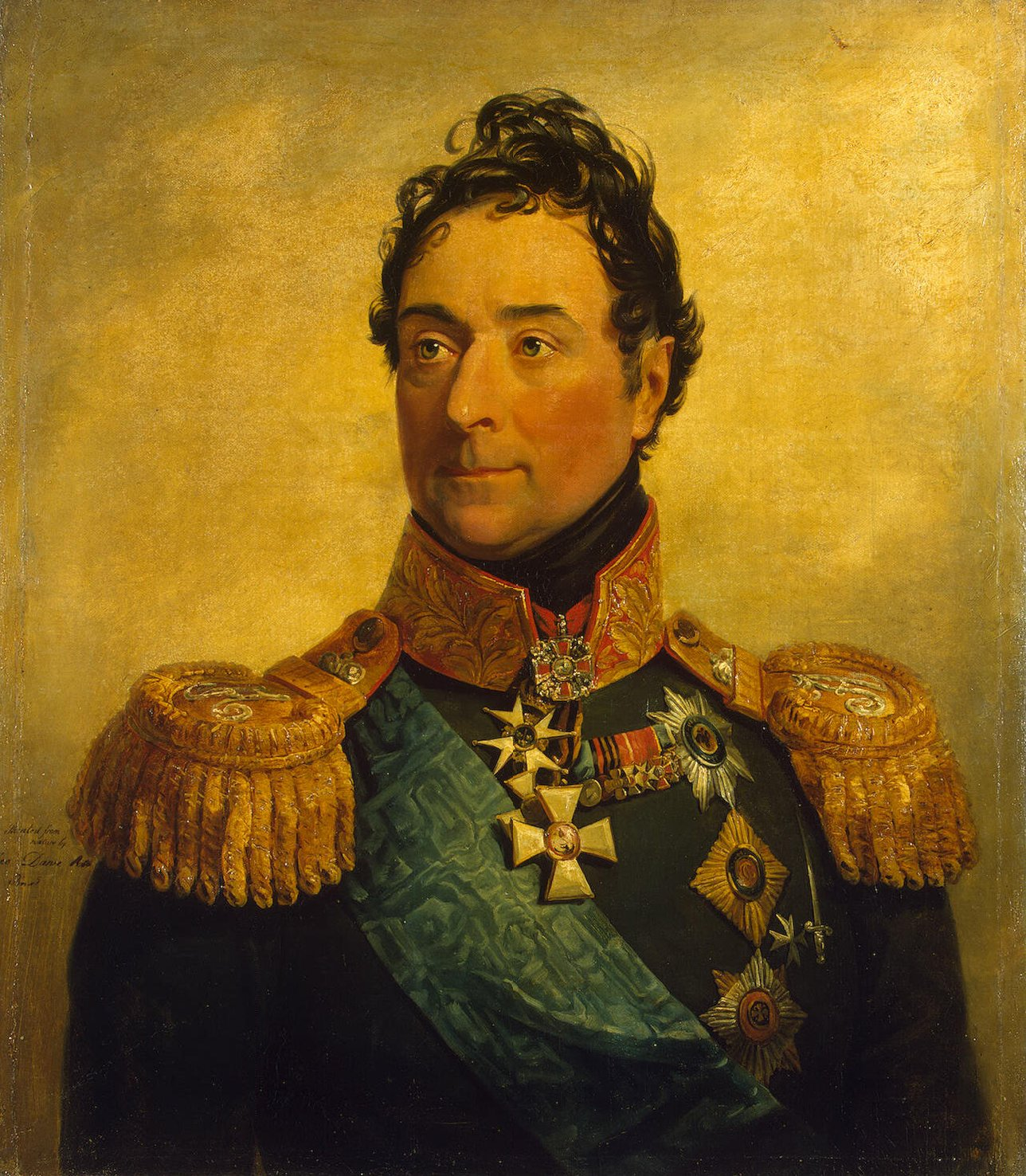
- Portrait by George Dawe, before 1825
- Born: 24 January 1763; Paris, France
- Died: 16 July 1831 (aged 68); Odessa, Russian Empire
- Military career
- Allegiance: France; Russia
- Branch: Infantry
- Service years: 1778–1831
- Rank: General
- Conflicts: American Revolutionary War; Russo-Swedish War (1788–1790); Russo-Turkish War (1787–1792); French Revolutionary Wars; Russo-Turkish War (1806–1812); Battle of Frasin; Napoleonic Wars; Russo-Turkish War (1828–1829)
- Awards: Order of the Holy Spirit; Order of the Golden Fleece; Order of St. Andrew; Order of St. Anna; Order of St. George; Order of the White Eagle; Order of St. Vladimir; Order of Saint Louis; Order of the Black Eagle; Society of the Cincinnati
- Other work: Governor of New Russia

Count Louis Alexandre Andrault de Langeron (Russian: Алекса́ндр Фёдорович Луи-Александр Андро, граф де Ланжеро́н, romanized: Aleksandr Fyodorovich Lanzheron; 24 January 1763 – 16 July 1831) was a French military figure in the service of, first, the Kingdom of France, and later the Russian Empire.

== Early life ==
Coat of Arms of the House of Andrault

Langeron, a member of a noble French family from Nivernais, held the titles of comte de Langeron, marquis de la Coste, baron de Cougny, de la Ferté et de Sassy, and lord du Mont, de Bazolle de l'Isle de Mars et d'Alligny. Born in Paris, he entered the French army at age 15 in 1779 as an Enseigne surnuméraire in the Gardes Françaises Regiment under Colonel M. le Maréchal Duc de Biron, and was appointed, in 1780, Sous-Lieutenant supernumerary in the regiment of Limousin infantry, under his uncle, Mestre de Camp Commandant, M. le Comte de Damas de Cruz, in the Corps d'armée under his cousin, Lieutenant General M. le Marquis de Langeron, destined for a descent on England. When this project was abandoned, he was, in 1781, on his own application, transferred as Sous-Lieutenant to the regiment of Bourbonnois and was dispatched to Caracas and then to Saint-Domingue from 1782 to 1783. Promoted to captain in the Condé-Dragons Regiment, he took part in the American Revolutionary War. Langeron was an original member of the Society of the Cincinnati and can be seen wearing his insignia for this order in the last position of his medal bar in his portrait by George Dawe. In 1786, Langeron was promoted to lieutenant-colonel in the Médoc Regiment, and in 1788 he became colonel of the Armagnac Regiment.

== French Revolutionary Wars ==
A Royalist, Langeron left France at the beginning of the French Revolution and entered Russian service in 1790 as a colonel in the Siberian Grenadier Regiment. He distinguished himself in battle against Sweden and then in the Russo-Turkish War (1787–1792). Accompanied by the duc de Fronsac and Prince Charles de Ligne, the son of the famous Austrian diplomat Charles-Joseph, Prince de Ligne, he was present at Alexander Suvorov's capture of Izmail, where he was wounded. He was given leave of absence in order to serve in an émigré army against revolutionary France, and after his return to Russia was sent to the Austrian army in the Netherlands as an observer.

Langeron served on the staff of Prince Frederick, Duke of York and Albany. At the Battle of Caesar's Camp on 7–8 August 1793, the Duke of York's 25,000-man column was sent on a long sweep in order to envelop the French army. The French commander, Charles Edward Jennings de Kilmaine spotted the danger and shifted his army out of the way. Leading his cavalry in pursuit on the second day, York arrived at Marquion which the French had set on fire. Accompanied only by his orderly and Langeron, York galloped through the burning village and saw a line of horsemen drawn up on the other side. Thinking they were his own cavalry, York trotted forward, remarking, "Here are my Hanoverians." Recognizing that they were French, Langeron caught the bridle of York's horse and led him back to safety.

He was promoted to brigade command in 1796 and became a major general in 1797 and lieutenant general in 1798.

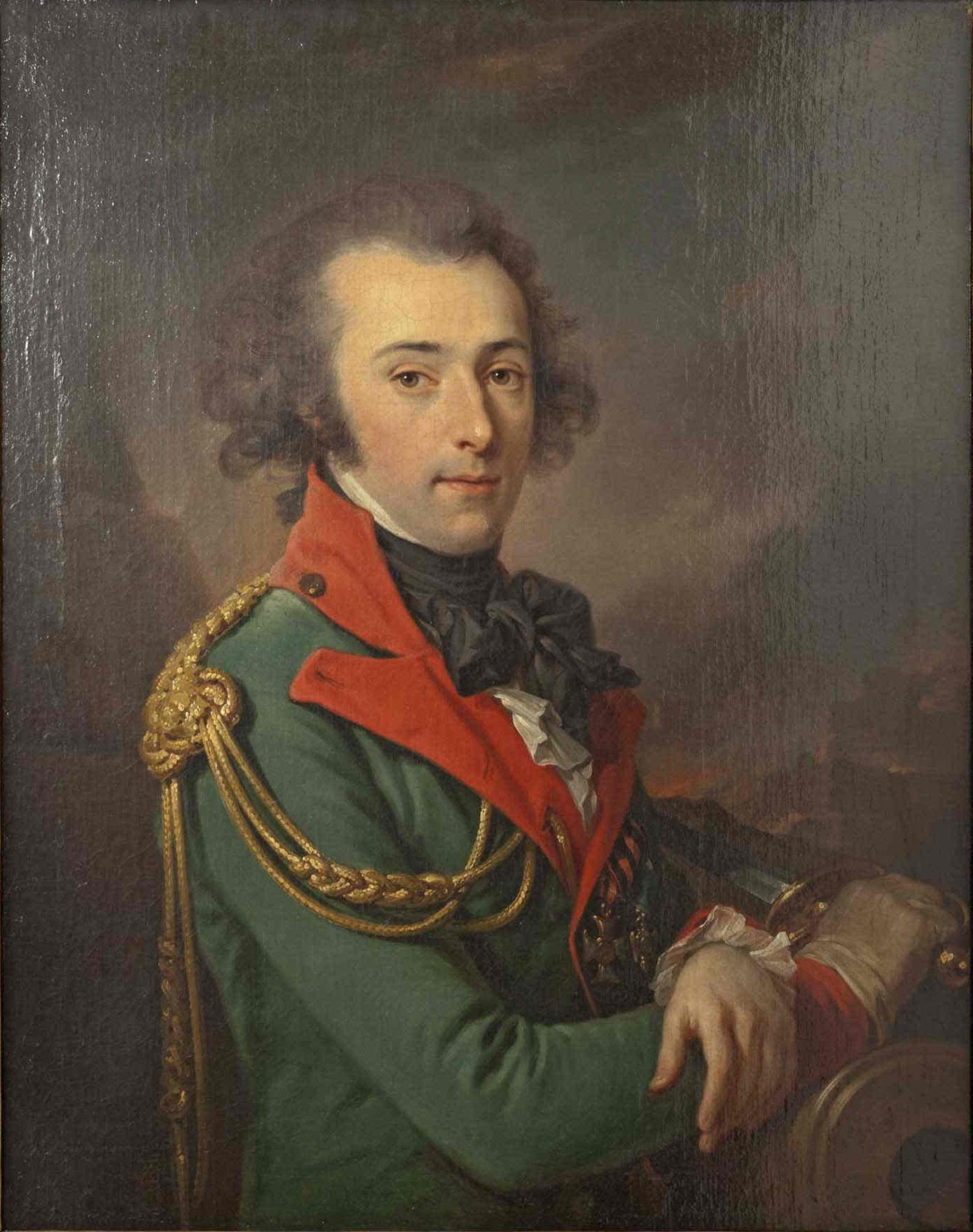
Portrait of de Langeron (Oil on canvas) signed and dated on the lower right "Jos: Kreutzinger pinxit 1791". Half-length portrait of Langeron in the uniform of a Colonel et adjutant serving in the army of the Russian Empire, wearing the Order of St. George and Society of the Cincinnati Eagle.

== Napoleonic Wars ==
At the Battle of Austerlitz on 2 December 1805, Langeron commanded the 2nd Column which counted 11,700 soldiers and 30 light guns. The column was divided into two brigades under Generalmajors Zakhar Dmitrievich Olsufiev and Sergei Kamensky. Olsufiev led the Viborg, Perm, and Kursk Infantry Regiments, each about 2,000 strong, and the 8th Jager Regiment, 1,000 men. Kamensky led the Ryazan Infantry and Fanagoria Grenadier Regiments, each 2,000 strong, 200 troopers of the St. Petersburg Dragoon Regiment, 100 Cossacks, and 150 pioneers. On the night before the battle, the Allied generals gathered to hear the Austrian Franz von Weyrother explain the tactical plan. As Langeron recalled, "Weyrother ... read the dispositions to us in a loud tone and with a self-satisfied air which indicated a thorough persuation of his own merit and of our incapacity." Weyrother planned to hurl the 59,300 men of 1st, 2nd, 3rd, and 4th Columns of the Allied army against the French right flank, then envelop the French as they fled toward Brno (Brünn).

Langeron objected that the plan left the Allied center too weak, but his concerns were brushed aside. In fact, Emperor Napoleon prepared a trap, and the Allies walked right into it. At 9:00 am, Napoleon ordered the attack on the Allied center which immediately gained a foothold. One of Langeron's brigades attempted to counter the French but was eventually defeated. By 2:00 pm, the Allied center collapsed and the victorious French advanced to strike the 1st, 2nd, and 3rd Columns from the flank and rear. The 3rd Column surrendered, the 2nd Column was badly mauled, and the survivors were fleeing. Perm was nearly destroyed, suffering 1,729 casualties. The other units also sustained heavy casualties: Kursk lost 1,276, Ryazan lost 612, Viborg lost 600, Fanagoria lost 580, and the Cossacks lost 47. The 8th Jagers escaped lightly, only losing 155.

Disgraced after the lost battle, he was sent to Odessa. In 1815 he became governor of New Russia. From 1806 to 1811, Langeron participated in the Russo-Turkish War (1806–1812) and served in the Army of Moldavia against the Ottomans. He fought at Giurgiu, Silistra, Frasin, Derekoy, and Ruse, for which he was promoted to General of the Infantry. He was highly critical of General Mikhail Kutuzov; his later memoirs are filled with "frank criticism", although this may have been influenced by the fact that he "was not appointed Russian Army Commander-in-Chief, and Kutuzov refused his suggestion to cross the Danube and attack Rushuk in 1811 during the war with Turkey."

In 1812, Langeron was given command of a corps in the Army of the Danube with which he fought at Brest-Litovsk and on the Berezina. In 1813, Langeron was put in charge of the blockade of Thorn, and later that year he commanded a corps at Koenigswarte, Bautzen, Siebeneichen, Lowenberg, Katzbach, and Leipzig. The next year he participated in the French campaign, during which he fought at the battles of Soissons, Craonne, Laon, Rheims, La Fère-Champenoise, and Paris, capturing the Montmartre heights. In late 1814, Langeron was given command of the 4th and 6th Corps in Volhynia. During the Hundred Days, he and his troops were marching to France, but they had only reached middle Germany by the time Napoléon was defeated at Waterloo.

== Later life ==
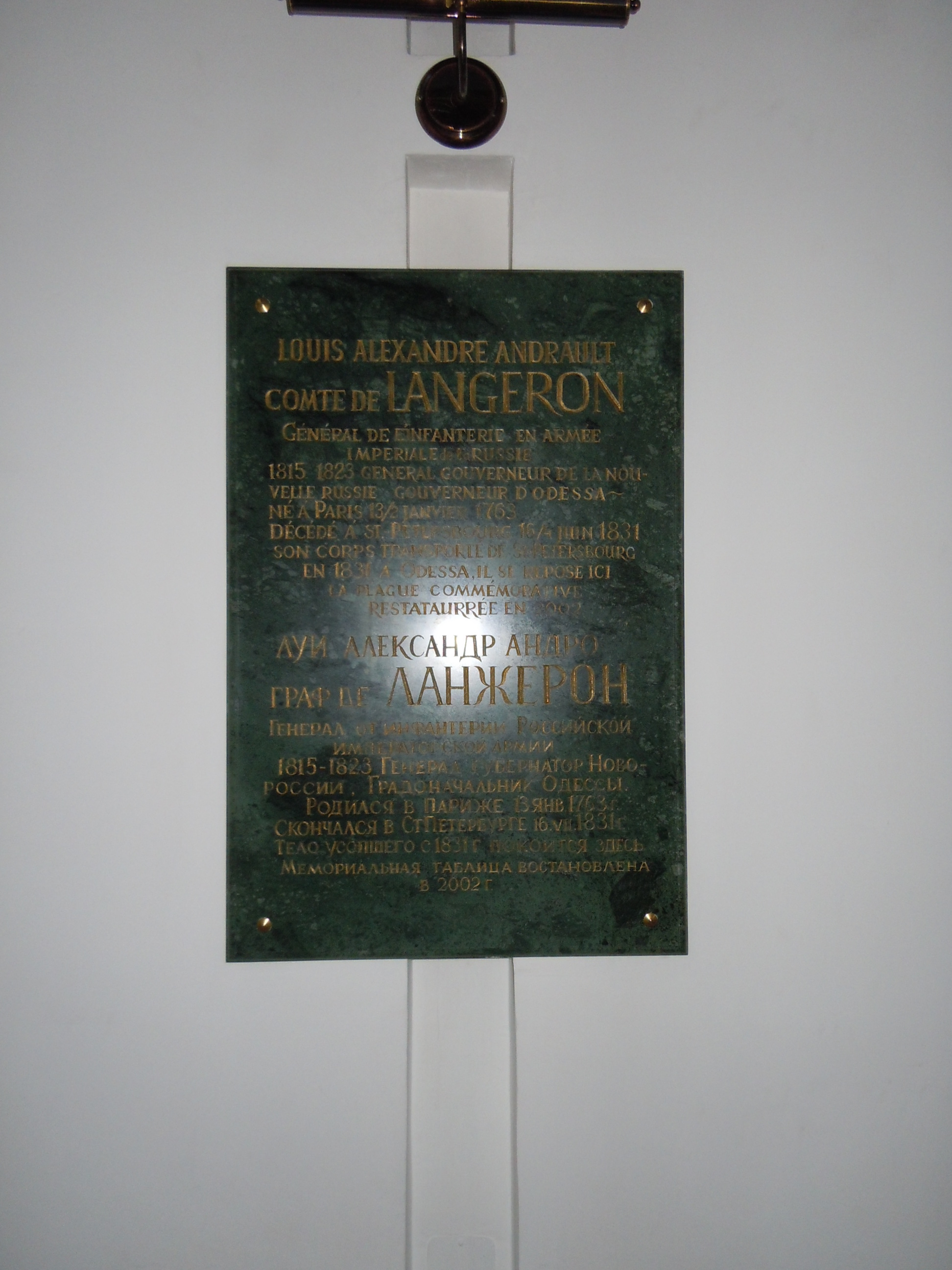
Langeron's grave in the Assumption Cathedral in Odessa

After a brief return in France, during the Bourbon Restoration, Langeron returned to Odessa as he was appointed the Military Governor of Kherson and Odessa, the commander-in-chief of the Bug and Black Sea Cossacks, and the Governor of Yekaterinoslav, Kherson, and Crimea. Exports continued to grow under his rule, to 40 million rubles in 1817. In Odessa, Langeron opened the Richelieu Lyceum for the elite: only the children of merchants and Greek immigrants could enroll. During Langeron's tenure, the construction of the Odessa Botanical Gardens and Primorsky Boulevard began. The most far-reaching legislation in Langeron's term was that the port of Odessa was pronounced a free port in 1819, which allowed the selling and storing of imported goods with no customs duties. Today Odessa has a street and a beach named after Langeron.

In 1823, Langeron was relieved of these duties because of poor health, and he then traveled to France, where he stayed until 1825. After the Decembrist revolt, Langeron was appointed a member of the sentencing panel. Called up with the start of the Russo-Turkish War (1828–1829) he fought against the Turks in a number of battles until he was replaced by Hans Karl von Diebitsch. Langeroin was a prolific writer, although "he requested that his Mémoires not be published until 50 years after his death." He died during a cholera epidemic in 1831.

Government offices
Preceded by Aleksandr Rudzevich as General-Governor of New Russia	Military Governor of Kherson; 1815–1822	Succeeded by Ivan Inzov as Governor-General of New Russia and Viceroy of Bessarabia
Preceded by Thomas Cobley as acting mayor	Mayor of Odessa; 1816–1820	Succeeded by Nikolai Tregubov
