= Mikhail Kamensky =

Russian field marshal (1738–1809)

Field Marshal Count Mikhail Kamensky
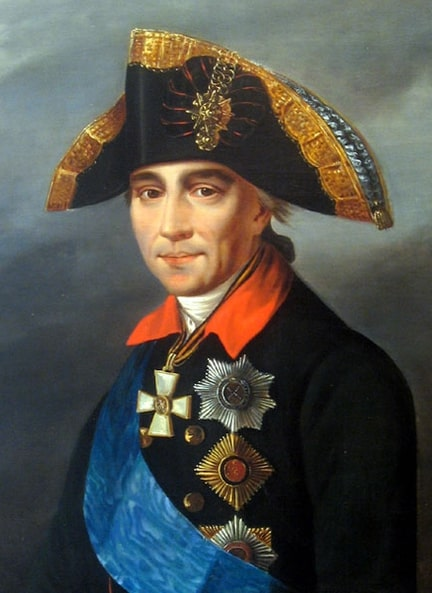
- Portrait, 18th century

Military Governor of Saint Petersburg
- In office 27 August 1802 – 16 November 1802
- Preceded by: Mikhail Kutuzov
- Succeeded by: Pyotr Tolstoy

Personal details
- Born: Mikhail Fedotovich Kamensky; 19 May 1738 Saint Petersburg, Russia
- Died: 12 August 1809 (aged 71) Moskvorechye-Saburovo, Russia
- Cause of death: Murder
- Spouse: Anna Pavlovna Shcherbatova
- Awards: Order of St. George

Military service
- Allegiance: Russia
- Branch/service: Imperial Russian Army
- Years of service: 1758–1806
- Rank: Field Marshal
- Battles/wars: Seven Years' War; Russo-Turkish War (1768–1774); Siege of Bender; Siege of Akkerman; Battle of Kozludzha; Russo-Turkish War (1787–1792); Napoleonic Wars; War of the Fourth Coalition; Battle of Czarnowo

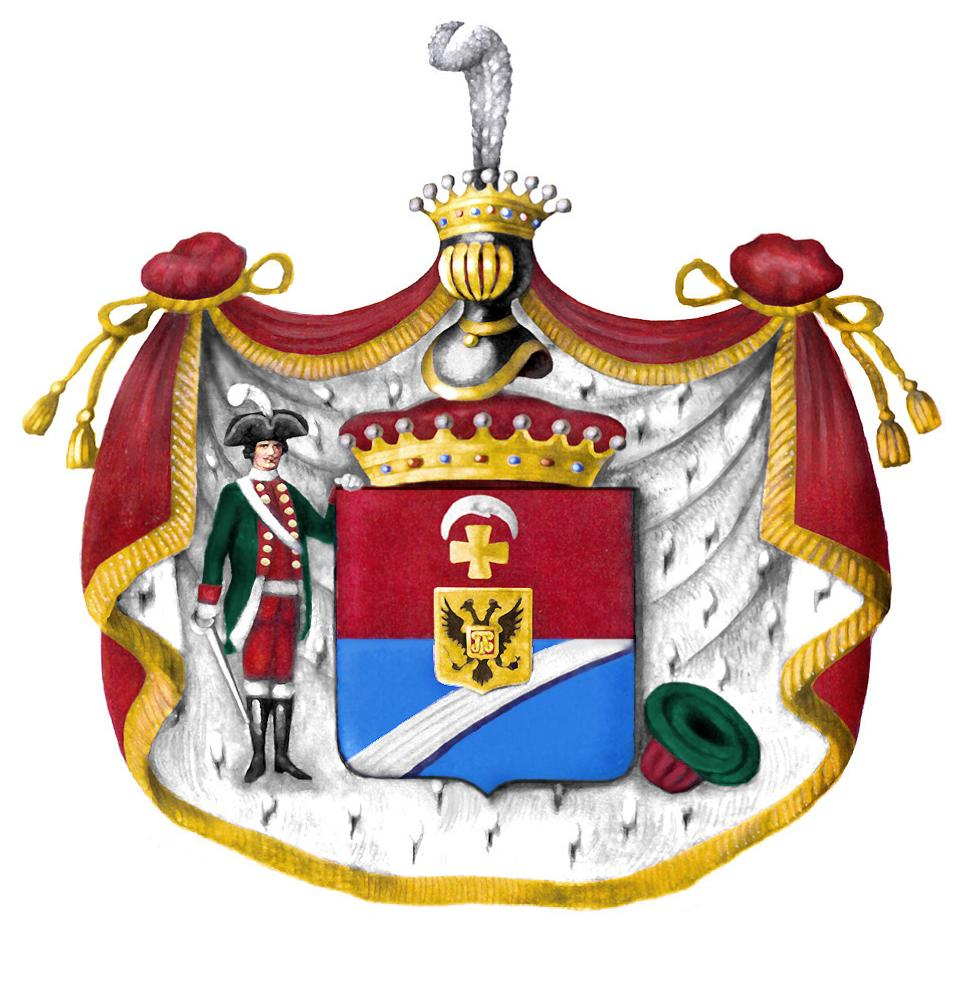
Comital coat of arms of the Kamensky family, granted to Mikhail Fedotovich on 5 April 1797 by Emperor Paul I of Russia

Count Mikhail Fedotovich Kamensky (Russian: Михаи́л Федо́тович Каме́нский; 19 May [O.S. 8 May] 1738 – 24 August [O.S. 12 August] 1809) was a Russian nobleman and a noted field marshal, who distinguished himself in the Catherinian wars and the Napoleonic campaigns.

== Biography ==
Mikhail Kamensky served as a volunteer in the French Army in 1758–1759. He then took part in the Seven Years' War. In 1783, Kamensky was appointed as the governor general of Ryazan and Tambov Governorates. During the war with Turkey, in 1788, he defeated the Turks at the Moldavian settlement of Gangur. In the previous war with the Turks, he had helped Alexander Suvorov, who had earned a reputation as one of Russia's great generals, to win the victory at Kozludzha, which ended the war. When prince Potemkin fell ill and entrusted his command of the army to Mikhail Kakhovsky, Kamensky refused to subordinate himself, referring to his seniority. For this, he was discharged from military service.

On 5 April 1797, Emperor Paul I granted Kamensky the title of count in the Russian Empire and made him retire. In 1806, Alexander I of Russia appointed him commander-in-chief of the Russian army in Prussia, which had been fighting the French armies of Napoleon. After six days of being in command, on the eve of the battle of Pułtusk, he transferred the command to Friedrich Wilhelm Graf von Buxhoeveden under pretence of illness and left for his estate near Oryol.

== Death ==
Kamensky was notorious for his maltreatment of his serfs, and he was killed by one of them on 12 August 1809, at the age of 71. His death occasioned a sentimental poem by Vasily Andreyevich Zhukovsky, Russian poet of the 1810s and a leading figure in Russian literature in the first half of the 19th century.

== Descendants ==
He was married to Princess Anna Pavlovna Shcherbatova (1749–1826), the daughter of Prince Pavel Nikolaevich Shcherbatov (1722–1781), and his wife, Princess Maria Feodorovna Golitsyna (1709–1769).

He was the father of two Russian generals: Sergei Mikhailovich Kamensky and Nikolai Mikhailovich Kamensky. Through his son Sergei, British actress and Academy Awards winner, Helen Mirren, DBE and her cousin, Tania Mallet, an actress, model and former Bond girl are also among his direct descendants.

== Sources ==
- "Каменские, военачальники" . Brockhaus and Efron Encyclopedic Dictionary (in Russian). 1906.
