= Sergei Kamensky =

Russian general (1771–1834)

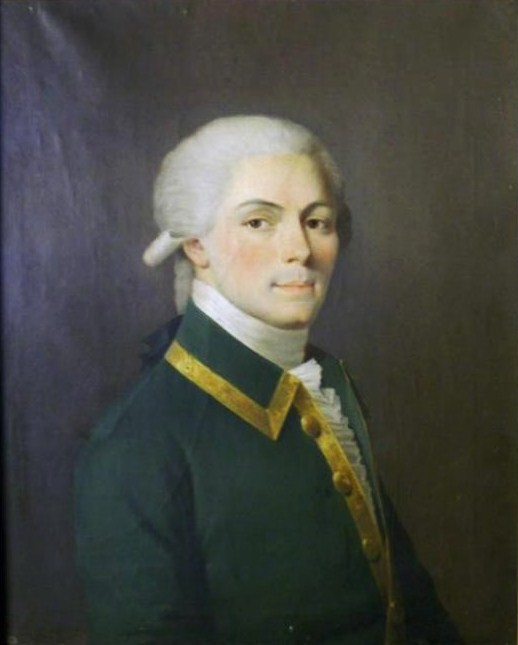
Portrait of Count Sergei Mikhailovich Kamensky by an unknown painter (1790s)

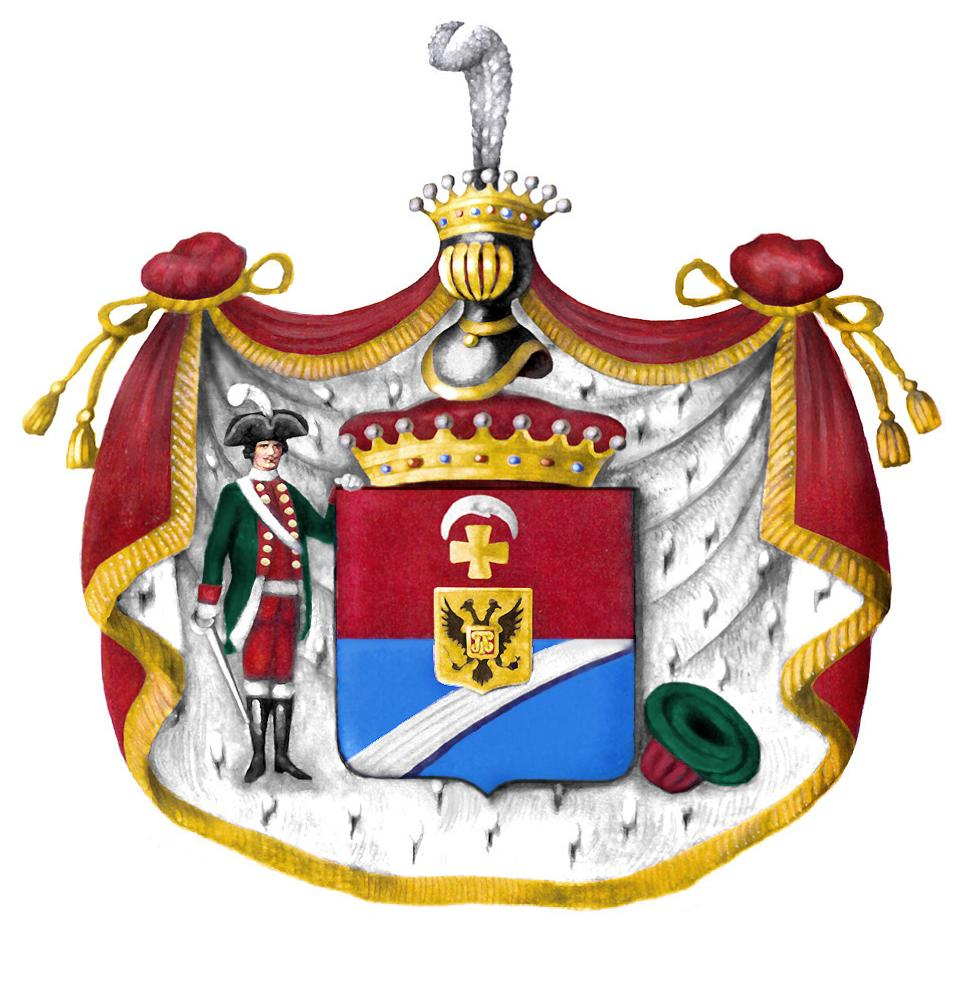
Coat of arms of the Counts Kamensky, granted to them in 1797 by Paul I of Russia

Count Sergei Mikhailovich Kamensky (Russian: Серге́й Миха́йлович Каме́нский; November 5, 1771 – December 8, 1834) was a Russian infantry general who served in the Napoleonic Wars. The victor at the storming of Bazargic and the battle of Shumen.

== Early life ==
Born into the family of Russian nobility, Sergei Kamensky was the son of Field Marshal Count Mikhail Kamensky and his wife, Princess Anna Pavlovna Shcherbatova (1749–1826). He was elder brother of General Count Nikolai Kamensky (in military histories he is known as Kamensky-1 and his younger brother as Kamensky-2). Like many sons of nobles, he was enlisted as an infant in a regiment and received his education in a cadet school.

== Military career ==
In 1789, he became a lieutenant colonel in the Ekaterinoslav Grenadier Regiment and participated in the Russo-Turkish War; in 1792–1794, he served in the Russo-Polish War and the Kościuszko Uprising, being wounded in the stomach at Praga, across the river from Warsaw. In 1797 he was promoted to colonel and in 1798 to major general, but he was disgraced by Paul I and discharged from the army in 1798.

He returned to service after Paul's death in 1801 and was appointed commander of the Fanagoria Grenadier Regiment on August 31 of that year. He participated in the War of the Third Coalition and fought in Langeron's column at Austerlitz, where he was awarded the Order of St. Anna, 1st Class; a historian of the battle says "Kamensky-1's brigade over-achieved in a very difficult situation... [He] stands out for his rare example of initiative and effective intervention at a critical point in the battle." On June 27, 1806, he was promoted to lieutenant general and given command of the 12th Division. He joined the Army of Moldavia and participated in another Russo-Turkish War, in which he took part in actions at Brăila, Constanţa, Babadag, and Varna. In 1810, he served under his younger brother, General Nikolai Kamensky, and distinguished himself by commanding in the battle at Bazargic, for which he was promoted to general of infantry. He defeated the Turkish army at Shumen (Shumla) on August 4 and was awarded the Order of St. George (2nd Class). He commanded the Russian left wing in the battle of Batin in northern Bulgaria on September 7, 1810. In 1812, Kamensky commanded a corps in the army of General Alexander Tormasov and took part in the battles of Kobrin and Gorodechno. However, he had a falling-out with Tormasov and took a prolonged furlough late in the year. He was discharged from the army in 1822 and spent the rest of his life at Orel.

== Personal life ==
Kamensky was both famous and notorious as the owner of a serf theater that had been created by his father; he brought it to Orel, where he was cruel to his serfs but generous to the poor and "lived in unspeakable squalor."

This short, fat, bald dandy, the owner of seven thousand souls, created an elaborate complex on Cathedral Square with residence, church, theater, and actors' dorms — housing altogether about four hundred people. Sparing no expense, Kamensky engaged a German ballet master; bought an acting couple and their six-year-old tap-dancing daughter for 250 souls; maintained a well-trained serf orchestra and horn band... In a regiment-like operation, actors took their meals standing up and were marched back and forth to the music of drum and horn. A jail cell was on hand for infractions. Kamensky closely monitored actresses and had them flogged for leaving their quarters at night, corresponding with officers, or even looking at spectators. He dictated stage gestures as if from a lexicon, had actors memorize lines without a prompter, and beat them between the acts when they fumbled.

Though the theater was popular and influential, its expense eventually ruined Kamensky, whose cruelty to his serf actress Kuzmina inspired Alexander Herzen's story "The Thieving Magpie."

== Marriage and descendants ==
Count Sergei Mikhailovich Kamensky is a great-great-great-grandfather of British actresses Helen Mirren, DBE and her cousin, Tania Mallet, one of the Bond girls.
