= List of people on the postage stamps of Russia =

Stamp issues are described in the following general format: Year of issue: Catalogue number 1, Catalogue number 2.

The stamp catalogues are designated with letters placed before catalogue numbers:

- M – Michel catalogue
- S – Scott catalogue

The numbers of the Catalogue of Marka Publishing and Trade Centre, the official publishing house of Russian Post, are given without letters.

For example:

- 1992: 11, M:230 (Block3), S:6075 – the stamp issued in 1992, Marka catalogue number 11, Michel number 230 (Block3), Scott number 6075.
- 2012: 1603, M:1835. – the stamp issued in 2012, Marka catalogue number 1603, Michel number 1835 (a Scott number is not given).

The list includes the adhesive stamps, the stamps imprinted on postal stationeries (postal cards, stamped envelopes) are not mentioned in this list.

== A ==
- Alexander II of Russia (1818, Moscow – 1881, Saint Petersburg), Emperor of Russia (1855–1881). 2005: 1011—1015, M:1243—1247, S:6894—6898.
- Alexy II (1929, Tallinn, Republic of Estonia – 2008, Moscow), Patriarch of Moscow and all the Rus' (1990–2008), the primate of the Russian Orthodox Church. 2012: 1602, M:1834.
- Heydar Aliyev (1923, Nakhchivan, USSR – 2003, Cleveland, United States), a Soviet and Azerbaijan statesman, a First Secretary of the Central Committee of the Communist Party of the Azerbaijan SSR (1968–1982), a First Deputy Premier of the Soviet Union (1982–1987), a President of Azerbaijan (1993–2003). Hero of Socialist Labour (1979, 1983). 2013: 1700, M:1926.
- Glafira Alymova (1758, Golyazhie village, near Bryansk – 1826, Moscow), a lady-in-waiting of Catherine II, one of the first Russian female harpists. 2010: 1417, M:1649.
- Abram Arkhipov (1862, Egorovo village, Ryazan Gubernia – 1930, Moscow), a Russian and Soviet painter, a member of the art group Peredvizhniki. 2012: 1629, M:1861 (Block173).
- Irina Arkhipova (1925, Moscow – 2010, Moscow), a Soviet and Russian mezzo-soprano and contralto opera singer and a teacher of art. Hero of Socialist Labour (1986). 2012: 1603, M:1835.
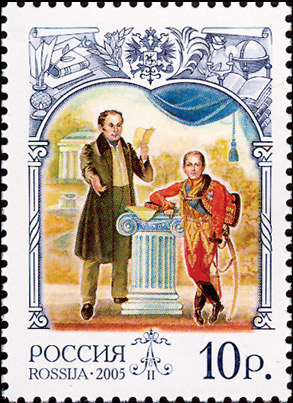
Alexander II of Russia. 2005: 1011, M:1243, S:6894. Crown Prince Alexander (on the right) with his mentor Vasily Zhukovsky.

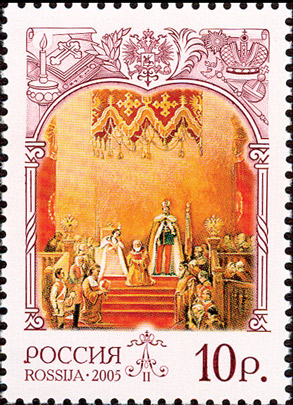
Alexander II of Russia. 2005: 1012, M:1244, S:6895.The coronation of Alexander II.

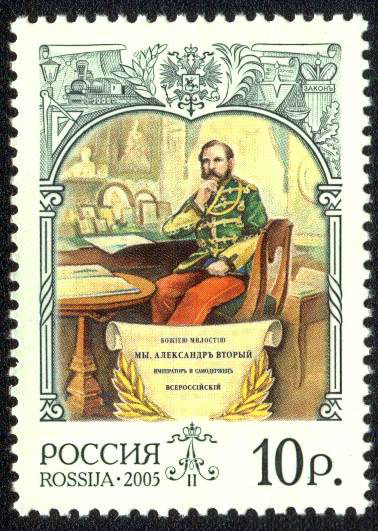
Alexander II of Russia. 2005: 1013, M:1245, S:6896. Alexander II in his study.

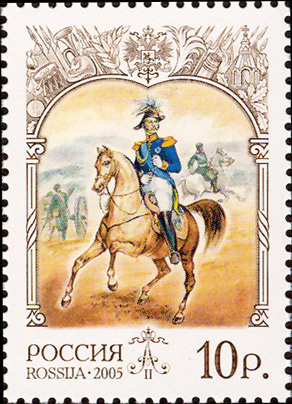
Alexander II of Russia. 2005: 1014, M:1246, S:6897. Alexander II during the Russo-Turkish War of 1877–1878.

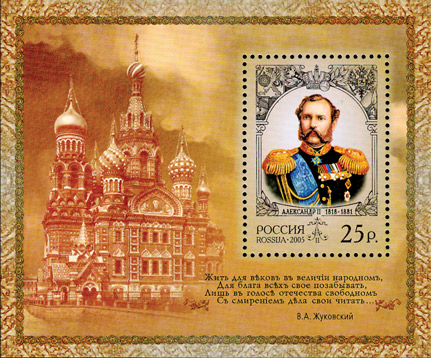
Alexander II of Russia. 2005: 1015, M:1247 (Block76), S: S:6898.Alexander II; the Church of the Savior on Blood dedicated to the memory of the murdered emperor.

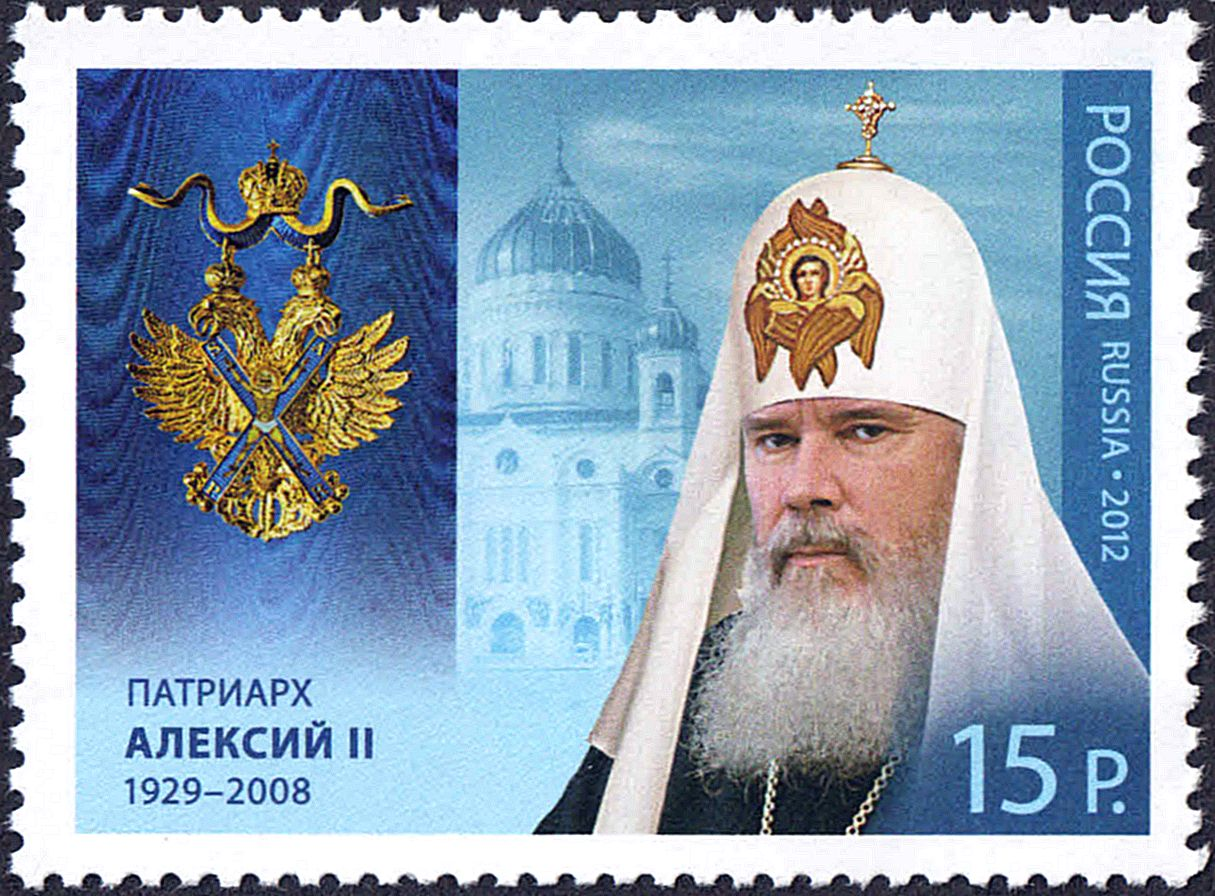
Alexy II of Moscow. 2012: 1602, M:1834.

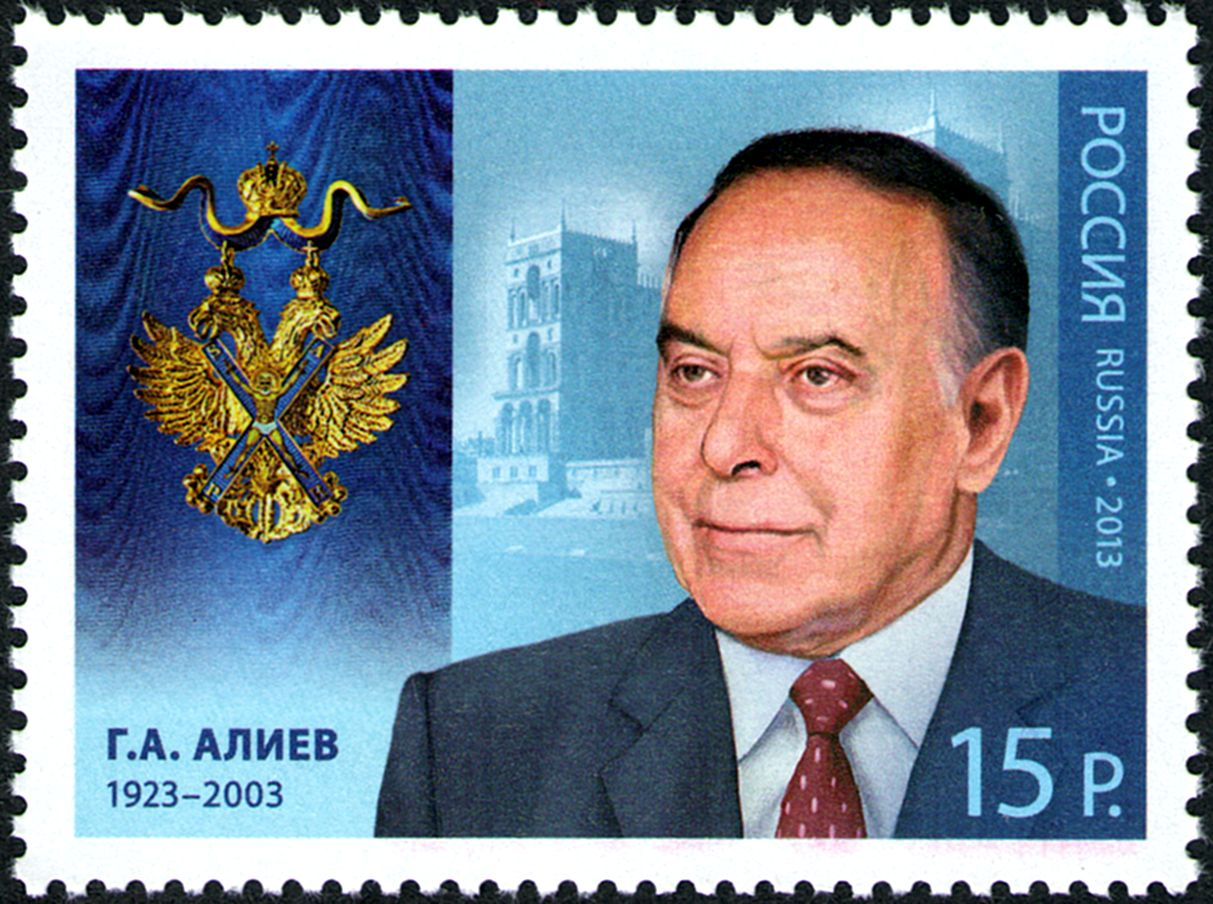
Heydar Aliyev. 2013: 1700, M:1926.

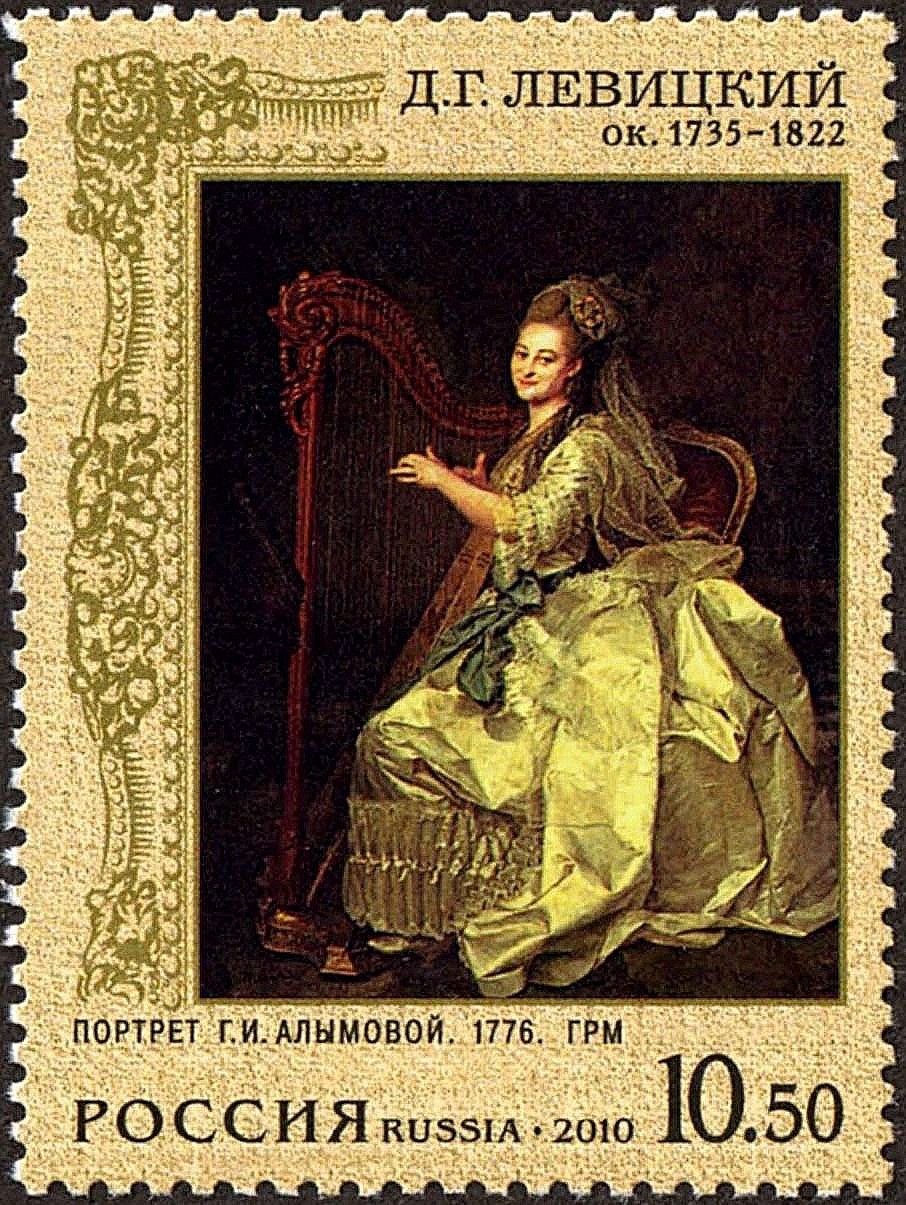
Glafira Alymova. 2010: 1417, M:1649. Portrait of G. Alymova by D. Levitzky. 1776.

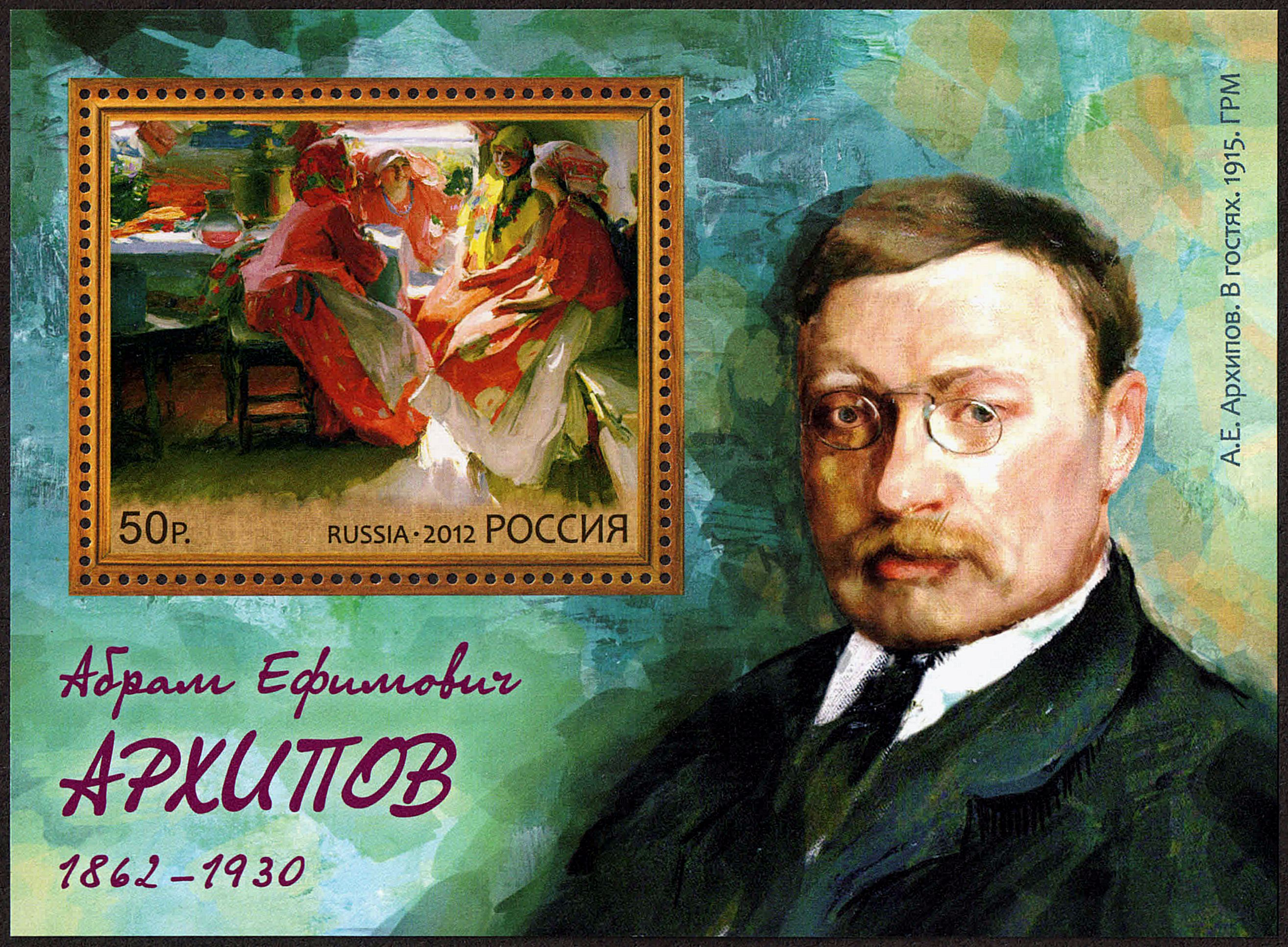
Abram Arkhipov. 2012: 1629, M:1861 (Block173).

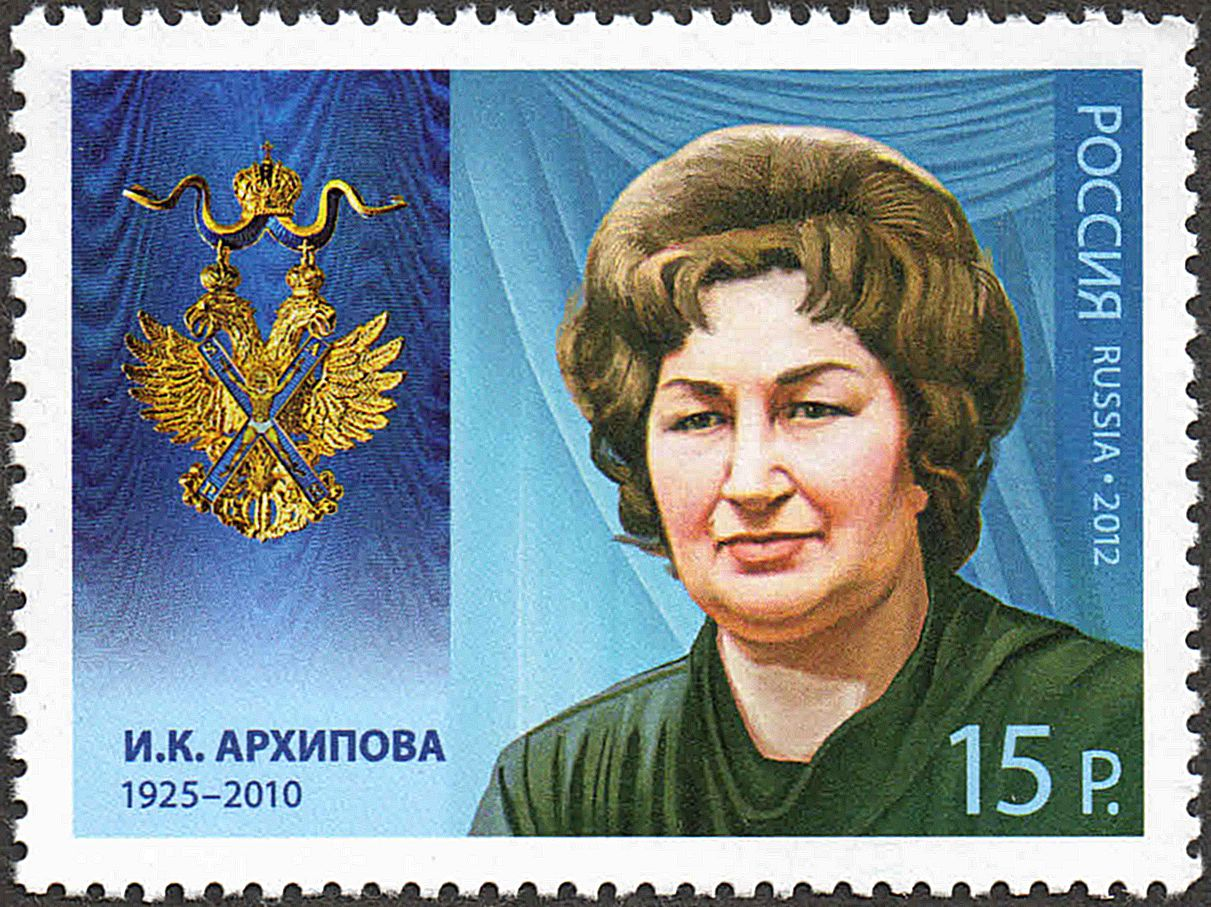
Irina Arkhipova. 2012: 1603, M:1835.

== B ==
- Grigory Bakhchivandzhi (Russian: Григорий Яковлевич Бахчиванджи; 1909, Brinkovskaya stanitsa, Azov-Black Sea Krai – 1943, Bilimbay, Sverdlovsk Oblast), a Russian military aviator, a Captain of the Soviet Air Forces, a test pilot. Grigory Bakhchivandzhi died 27 March 1943 during one of test flights of the Soviet rocket-powered fighter BI. Hero of the Soviet Union (1973, posthumously). 2009: 1303, M:1535.
- Vladimir Borovikovsky (1757, Myrhorod, Russian Empire – 1825, Saint Petersburg), a Ukrainian-born Russian painter, a master of portraiture. 2007: 1179, M:1411.
- Valery Bryusov (1873, Moscow – 1924, Moscow), a Russian poet, prose writer, dramatist, translator, critic and historian; one of the principal members of the Russian Symbolist movement. 2011: 1490, M:1722.
- Ivan Bubnov (1872, Nizhny Novgorod – 1919, Petrograd), a Russian marine engineer, a designer of submarines and a mathematician, a Major General of the Corps of Naval Engineers. 1993: 118, M:337, S:6172.
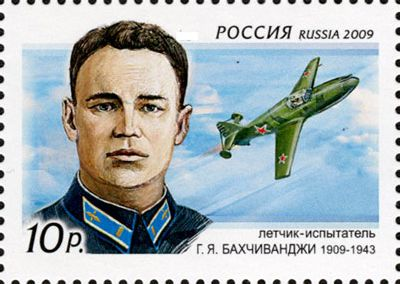
Grigory Bakhchivandzhi. 2009: 1303, М:1535.

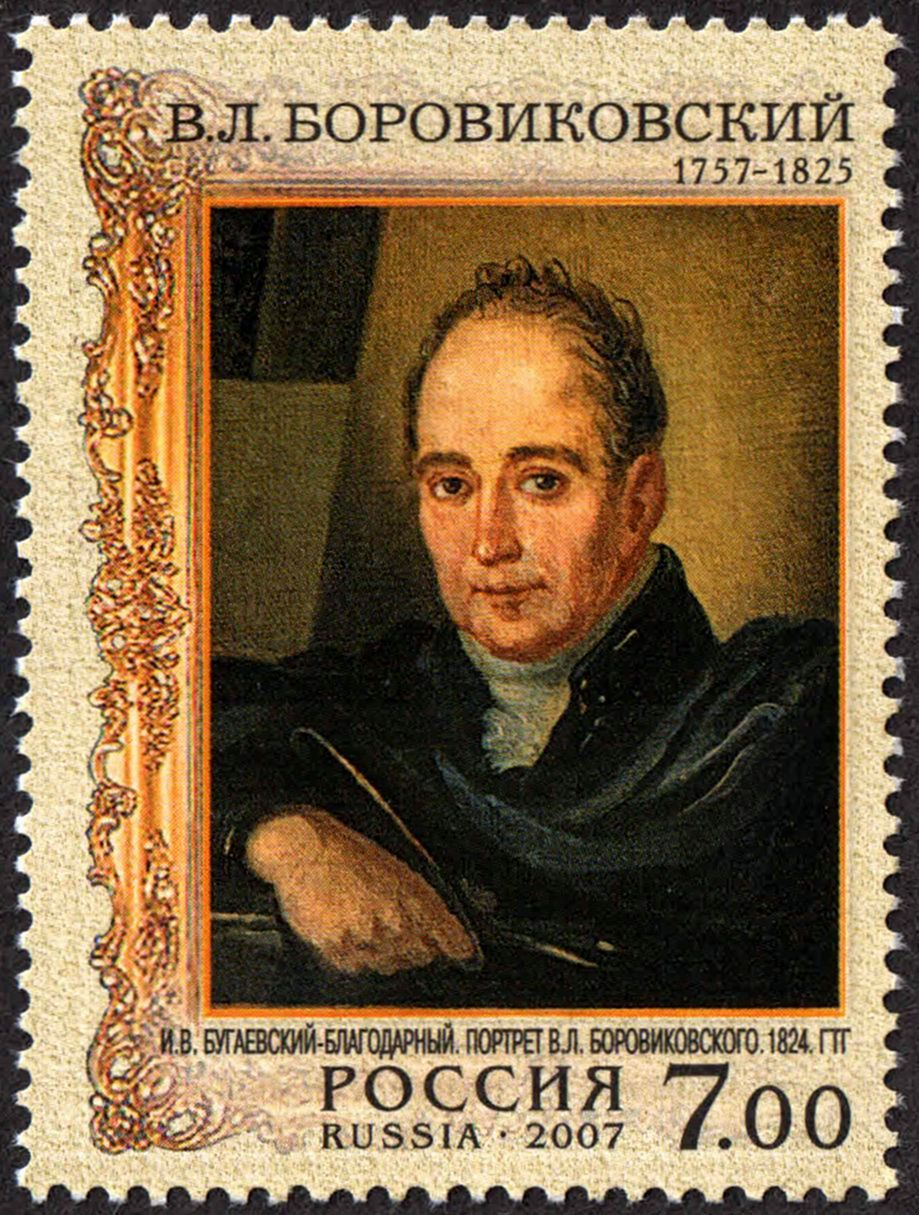
Vladimir Borovikovsky. 2007: 1179, M:1411. Portrait of V. Borovikovsky by Ivan Bugaevsky-Blagodarny. 1824.

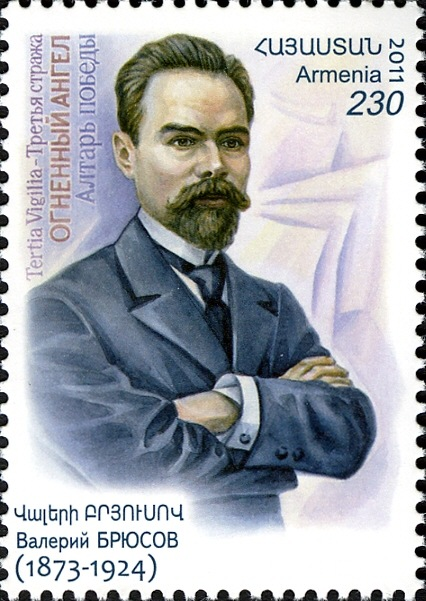
Valery Bryusov. 2011: 1490, M:1722.

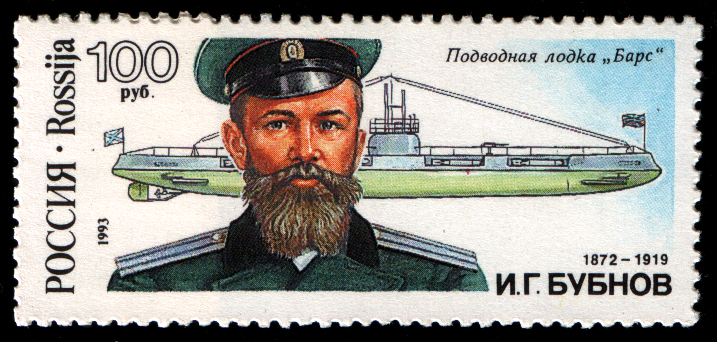
Ivan Bubnov. 1993: 118, M:337, S:6172.

== C ==
- Feodor Chaliapin (1873, Kazan – 1938, Paris, France), an outstanding Russian bass opera singer. 2012: 1612, M:1845.
- Viktor Chernomyrdin (1938, Chyorny Otrog village, Gavrilovsky District, Chkalov Oblast – 2010, Moscow), a Soviet and Russian statesman, a Minister of Gas Industry of the USSR (1985–1989), the founder and the first President of the State Gas Concern Gazprom (1989–1992), a Prime Minister of the Russian Federation (1992–1998), an Ambassador of Russia to Ukraine (2001–2009). 2013: 1687, M:1919.
- Pavel Chistyakov (1832, Prudy village, Tver Guberniya – 1919, Detskoe Selo), a Russian painter and a teacher of art, a professor of Imperial Academy of Arts. 2007: 1177—1178, M: 1409—1410.
- Christopher Columbus (before 31 October 1451, Genoa, Republic of Genoa – 1506 Valladolid, Crown of Castile), an explorer, navigator and colonizer traditionally considered as the discoverer of American continents. 1992: 11, M:230 (Block3), S:6075; 1992: 63, M:282, S:6108.
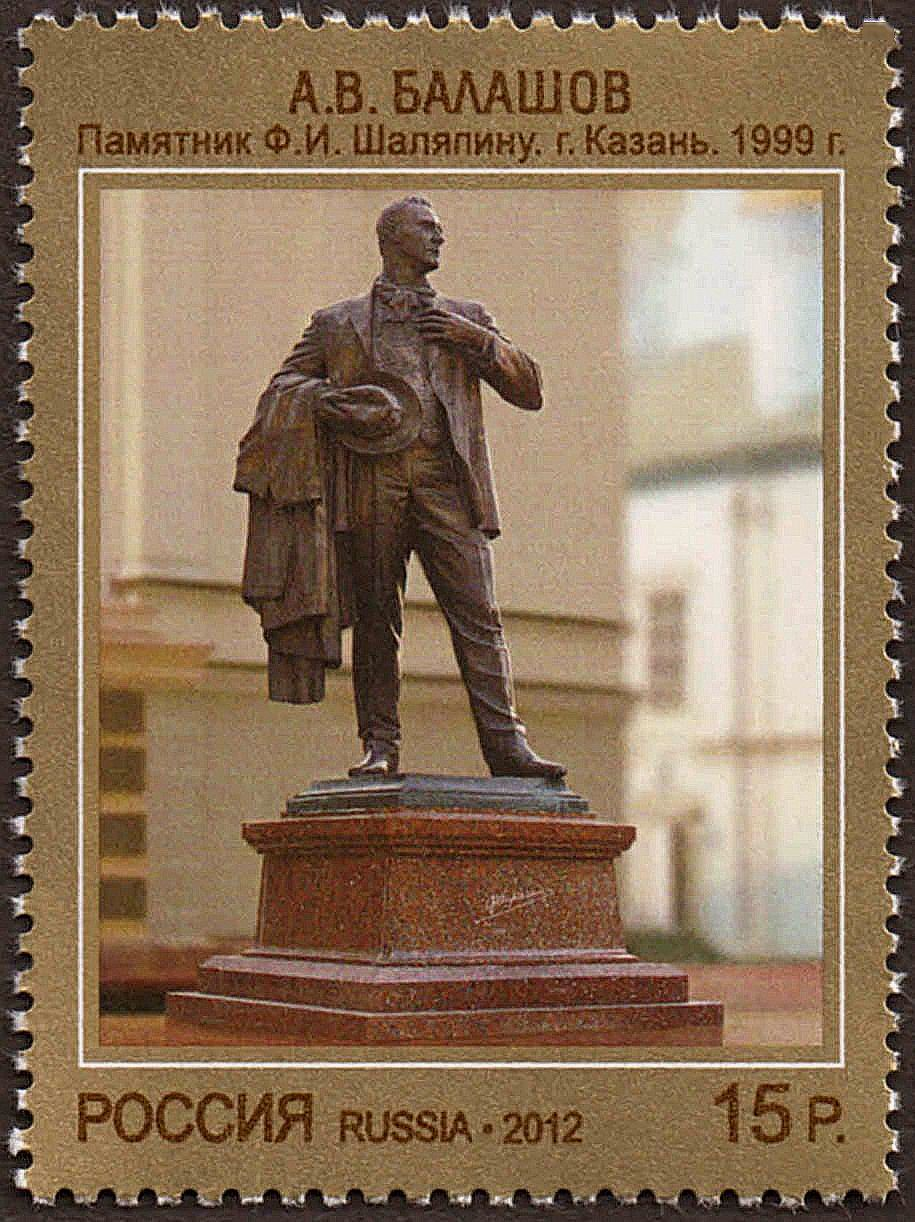
Feodor Chaliapin. 2012: 1612, M:1845. The monument to F. Chaliapin in Kazan by A. Balashov. 1999.

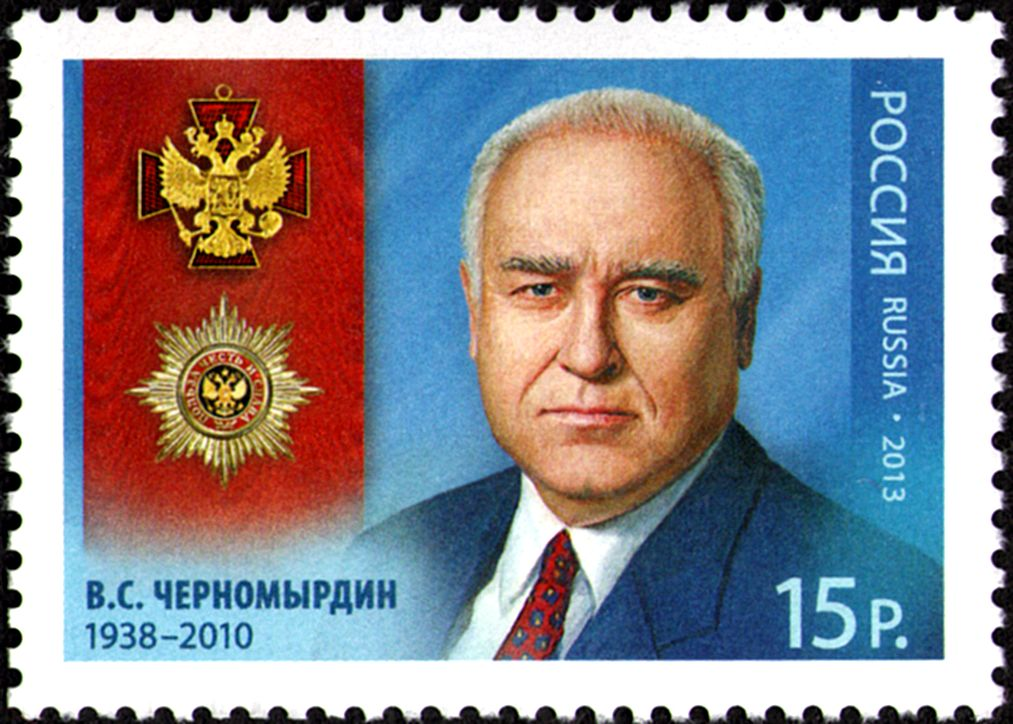
Viktor Chernomyrdin. 2013: 1687, M:1919.

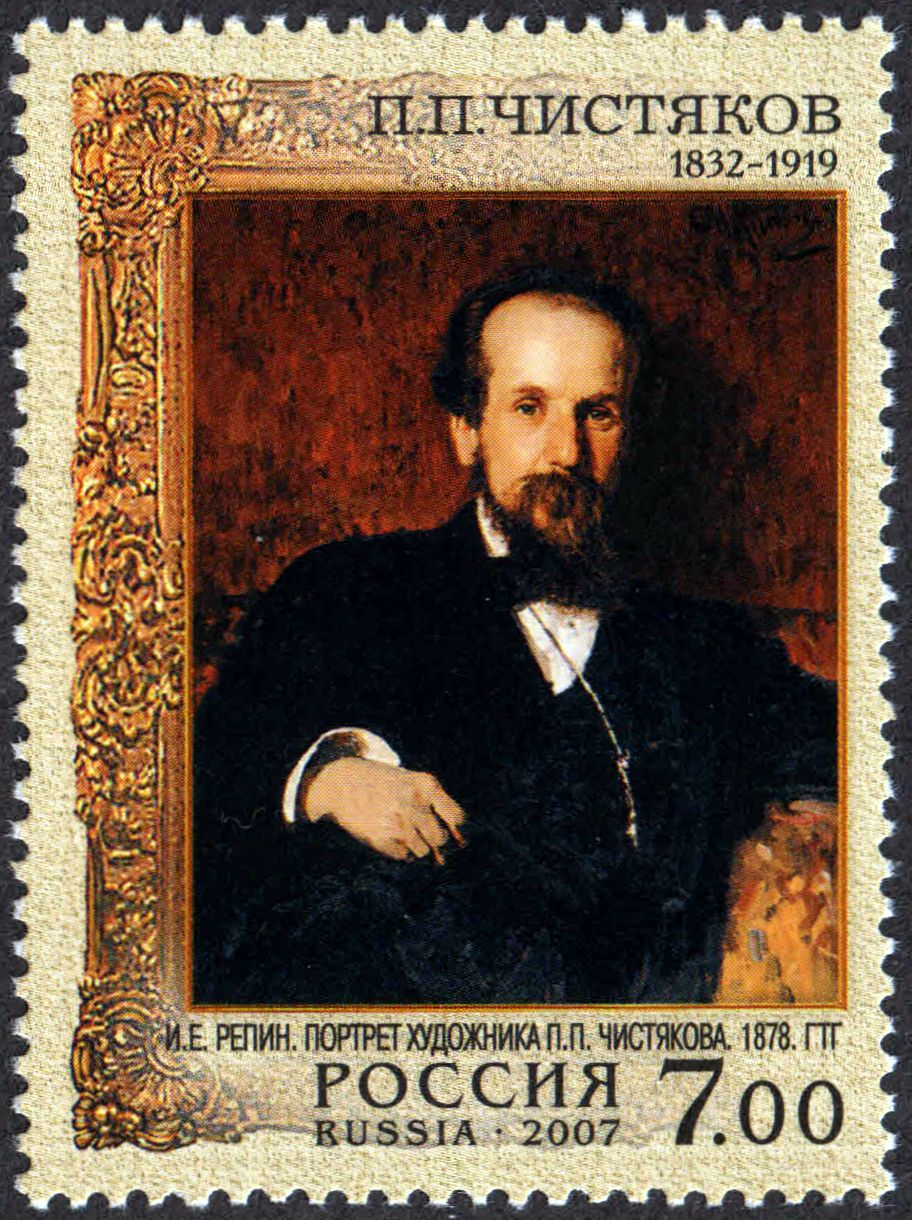
Pavel Chistyakov. 2007: 1177, M: 1409. Portrait of P. Chistyakov by I. Repin. 1878.

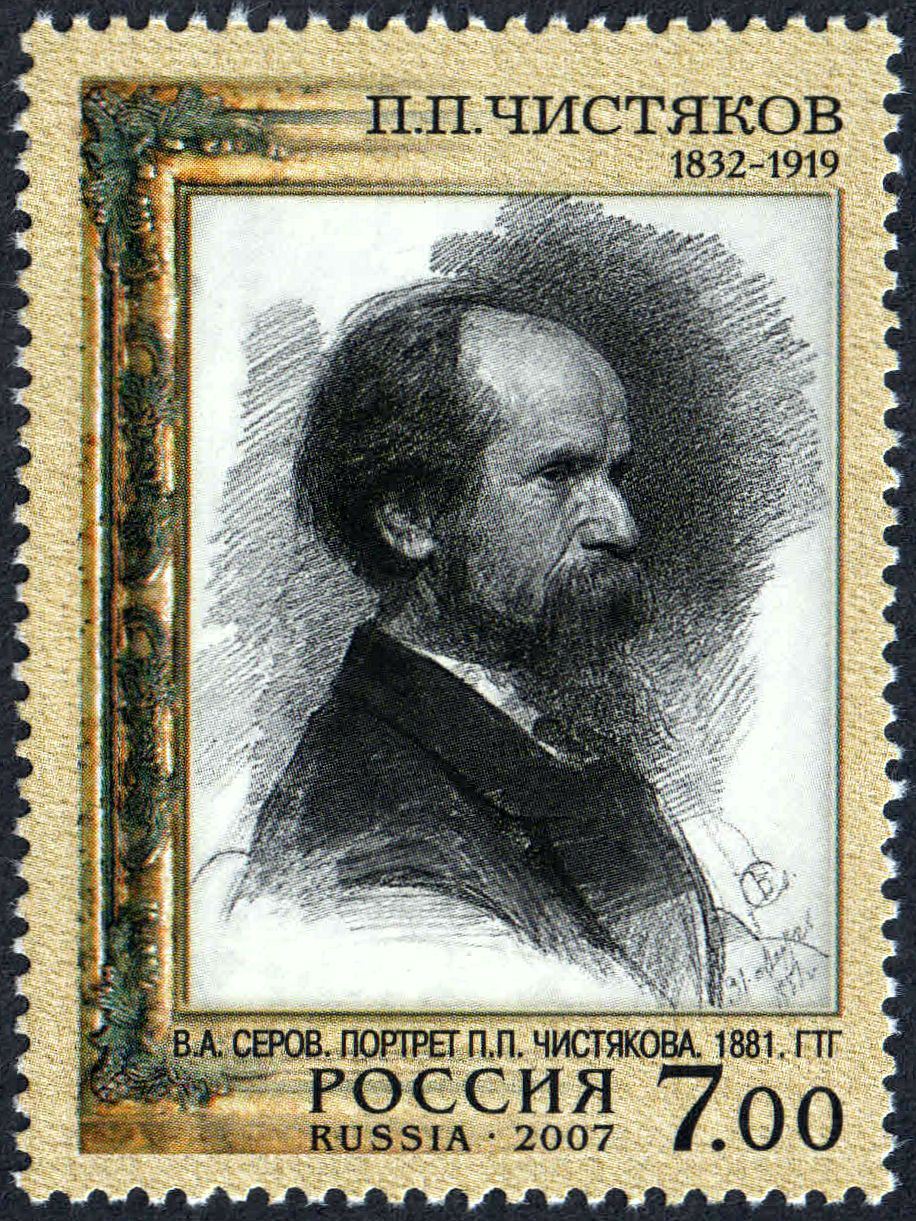
Pavel Chistyakov. 2007: 1178, M:1410. Portrait of P. Chistyakov by V. Serov. 1881.

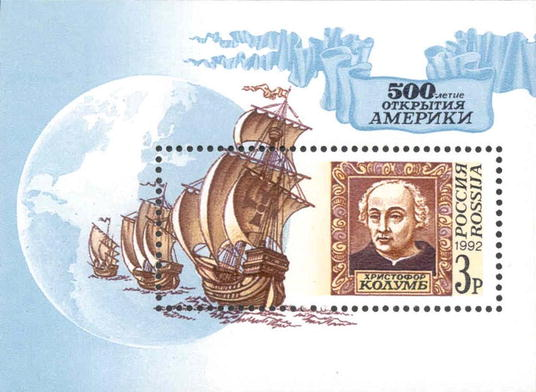
Christopher Columbus. 1992: 11, M:230 (Block3), S:6075.

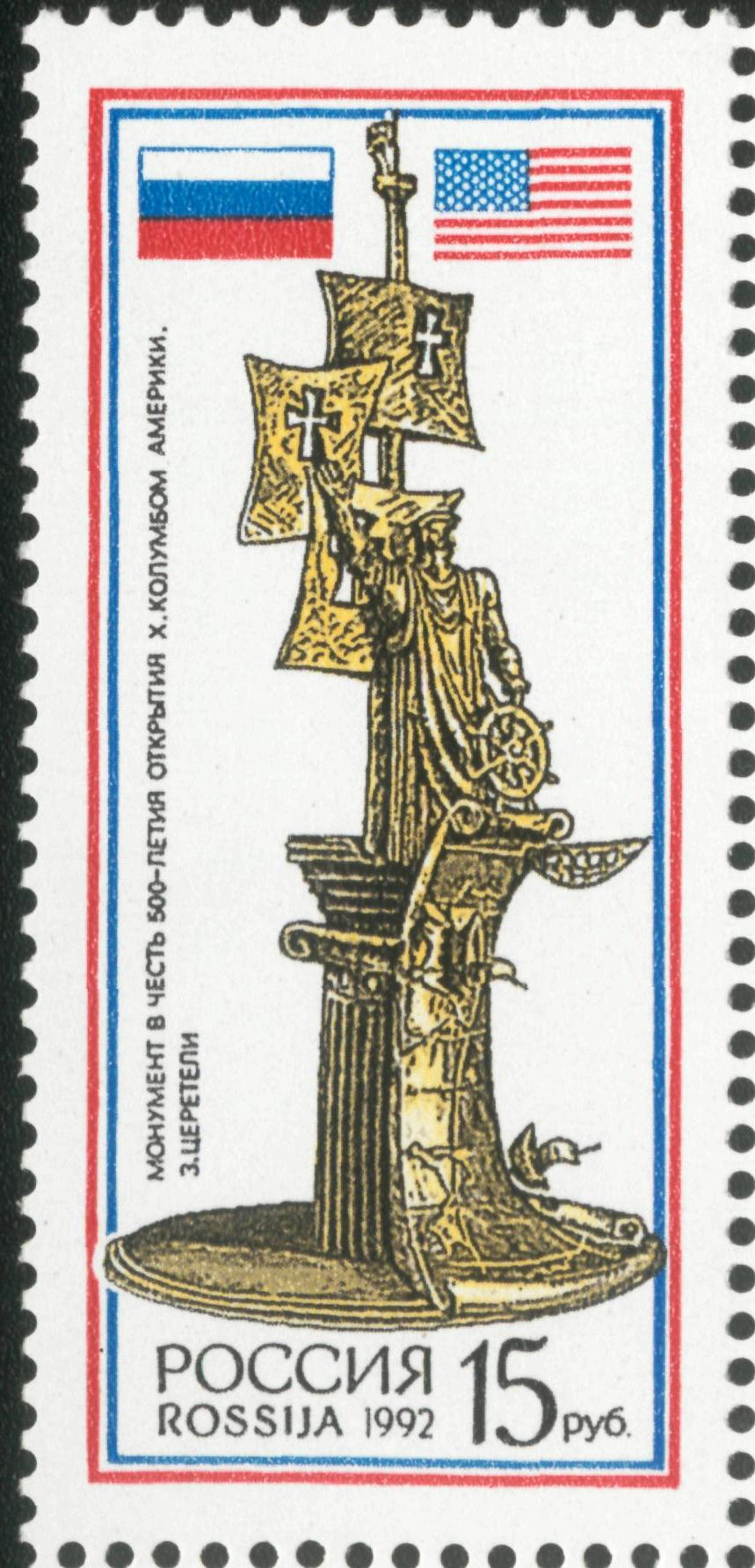
Christopher Columbus. 1992: 63, M:282, S:6108. The project of the monument to Columbus by Z. Tsereteli.

== D ==
- Vladimir Dal (1801, Lugansky Zavod, Russian Empire – 1872, Moscow), a Russian lexicographer, ethnographer, linguist, writer, the author of Explanatory Dictionary of the Living Great Russian Language. 2001: 713, M:945 (Block40), S:6668.
- Gavrila Derzhavin (1743, Sokury village, Laishevo Uyezd, Kazan Guberniya – 1816, Zvanka estate, Novgorod Gubernuiya), a Russian poet of the Age of Enlightenment, a scientist, and a statesman. 2012: 1630, M:1862.
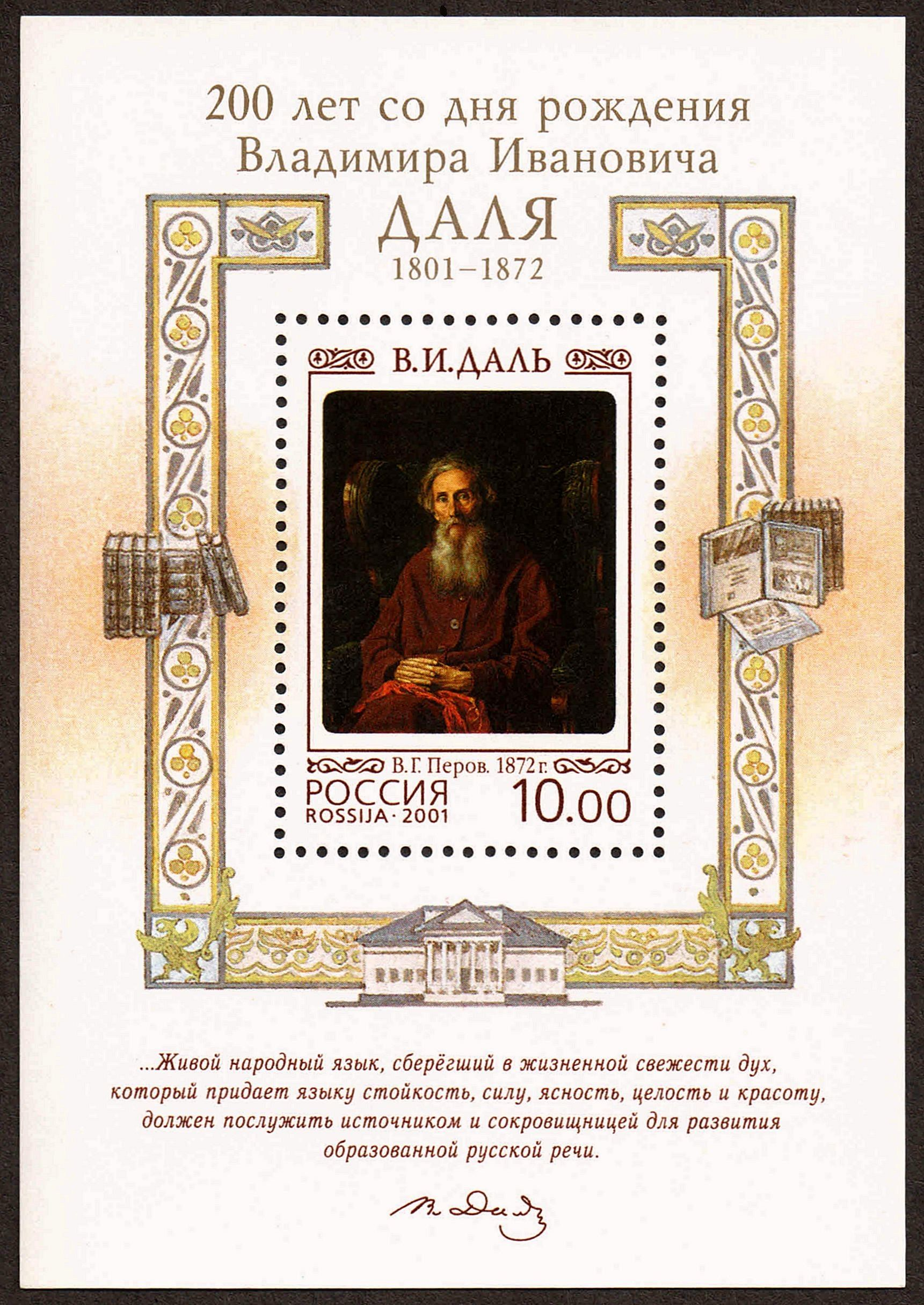
Vladimir Dal. Portrait of V. Dal by V. Perov. 1872. 2001: 713, M:945 (Block40), S:6668.

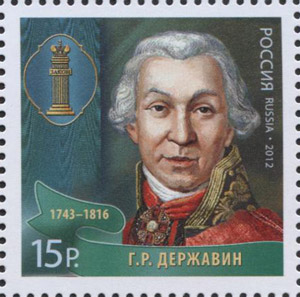
Gavrila Derzhavin. 2012: 1630, M:1862.

== E ==
- Sergei Eisenstein (1898, Riga, Russian Empire – 1948, Moscow), a pioneering Soviet Russian film director and cinema theorist. 2000: 619, M:851, S:6606c.
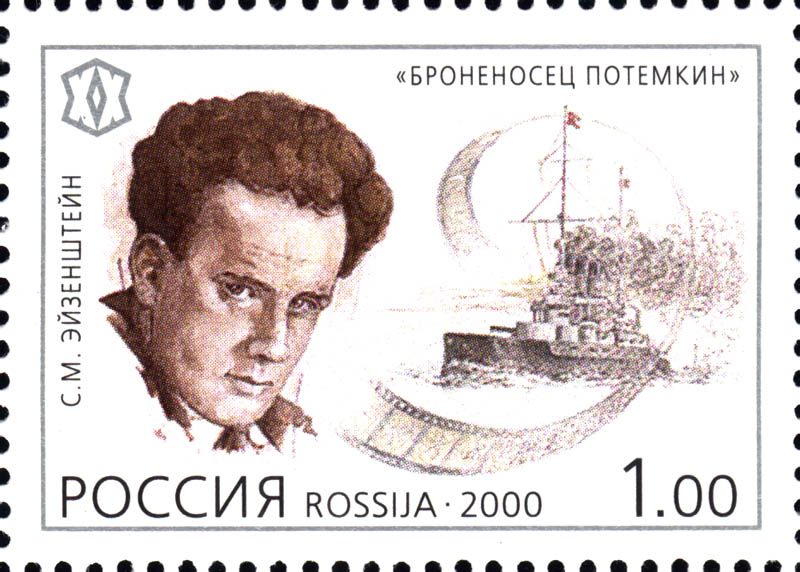
Sergei Eisenstein. 2000: 619, M:851, S:6606c.

== F ==
- Georgy Flyorov (1913, Rostov-on-Don – 1990, Moscow), a Soviet nuclear physicist, one of the discoverers of spontaneous fission of heavy elements, (1940), one of notable figures of the Soviet atomic bomb project, the founder and the first director of the Joint Institute for Nuclear Research in Dubna. Hero of Socialist Labour (1949). 2013: 1660, M:1892.
- Ilya Frank (1908, Saint Petersburg – 1990, Moscow), a Soviet physicist, a winner of Nobel Prize in Physics in 1958 for the work in explaining the phenomenon of Cherenkov radiation (jointly with P. Cherenkov and I. Tamm). 2008: 1219, M:1451.
- Yevgeny Fyodorov (1910, Bendery, Russian Empire – 1981, Moscow), a Soviet geophysicist, a polar explorer, the Head of Hydrometeorology Service of the USSR in 1939–1947 and 1962–1974. Hero of the Soviet Union (1938). 2010: 1398, M:1630.
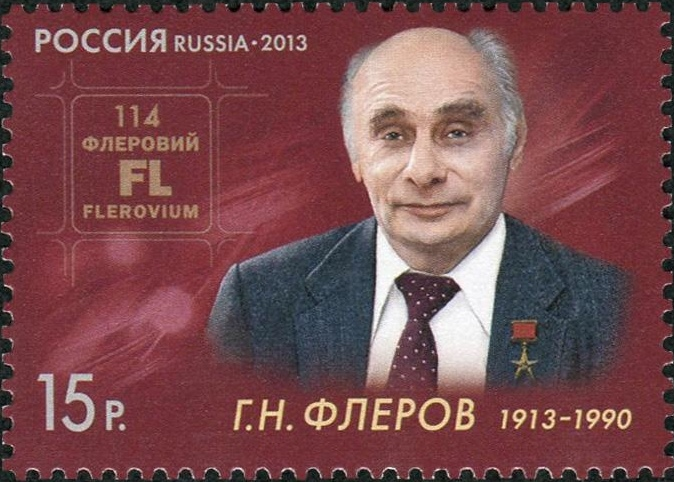
Georgy Flyorov. 2013: 1660, M:1892.

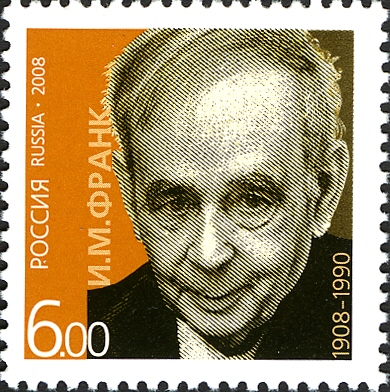
Ilya Frank. 2008: 1219, M:1451.

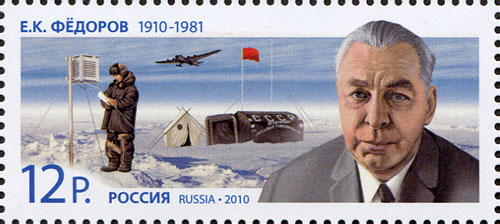
Yevgeny Fyodorov. 2010: 1398, M:1630.

== G ==
- Dmitry Mikhailovich Galitzine (Russian: Дмитрий Михайлович Голицын, 1735–1771) was a Russian nobleman of the princely house Galitzine, a son of Prince Mikhail Mikhailovich Galitzine (1684–1764) and his second wife Tatiana Kirillovna Galitzine, née Naryshkina (1702–1757). A Colonel of the Imperial Russian Army. 2010: 1394, M:1626.
- Rasul Gamzatov (1923, Cada village, Khunzakhsky District, Dagestan ASSR – 2003, Moscow), a Soviet and Russian Avarian poet and a public figure. Hero of Socialist Labour (1974) 2013: 1709, M:1941.
- Nikolai Ge (1831, Voronezh – 1894, Ivanovsky Khutor, Chernigov Gubernia, Russian Empire), a Russian painter, famous for his works on historical and religious motifs. 2006: 1075, M:1307, S:6942.
- Ivan Goncharov (1812, Simbirsk – 1891, Saint Petersburg), a Russian writer best known as the author of the novel Oblomov (1859). 2012: 1594, M:1826 (Block164).
- Maxim Gorky (A.M. Gorky) (1868, Nizhny Novgorod – 1936, Gorki, Moscow Oblast), a Russian and Soviet writer, thinker and political activist; a founder of the Socialist realism literally method. 2000: 620, M:852, S:6606d.
- Valentina Grizodubova (1909, Kharkov, Russian Empire – 1993, Moscow), a Soviet female pilot, a Podpolkovnik of the Soviet Air Force, a participant in record flights, the commander of 101st Regiment of Long Range Aviation in 1942–1944, an aviation engineer. The first woman awarded the title Hero of the Soviet Union (1938); Hero of Socialist Labor (1986). 2010: 1386, M:1618.
- Ernesto “Che” Guevara (1928, Rosario, Santa Fe, Argentina – 1967, La Higuera village, Vallegrande Province, Bolivia), a Latin American Marxist revolutionary, Comandante of Cuban Revolution. 2009: 1298, M:1530.
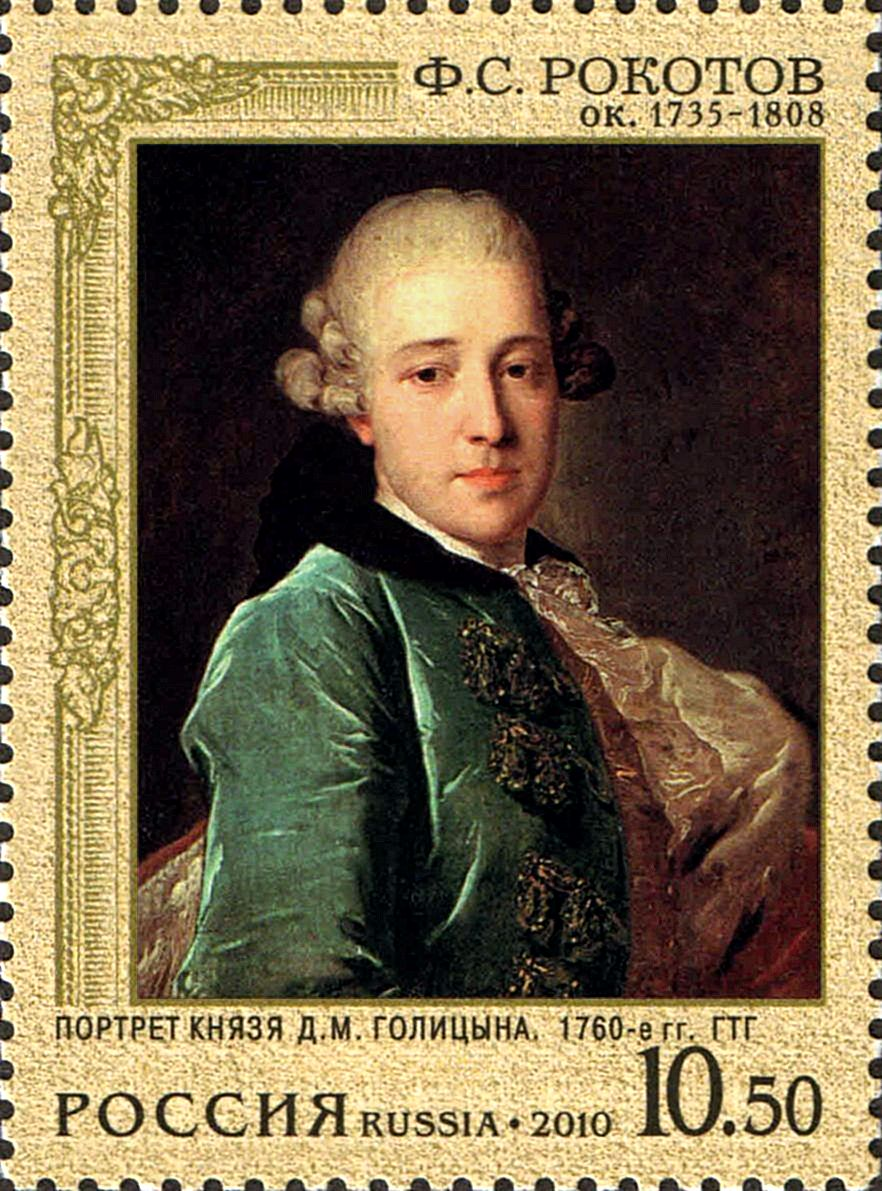
D. M. Galitzine. 2010: 1394, M:1626. Portrait of D.M. Galitzine by Fyodor Rokotov. 1760s.

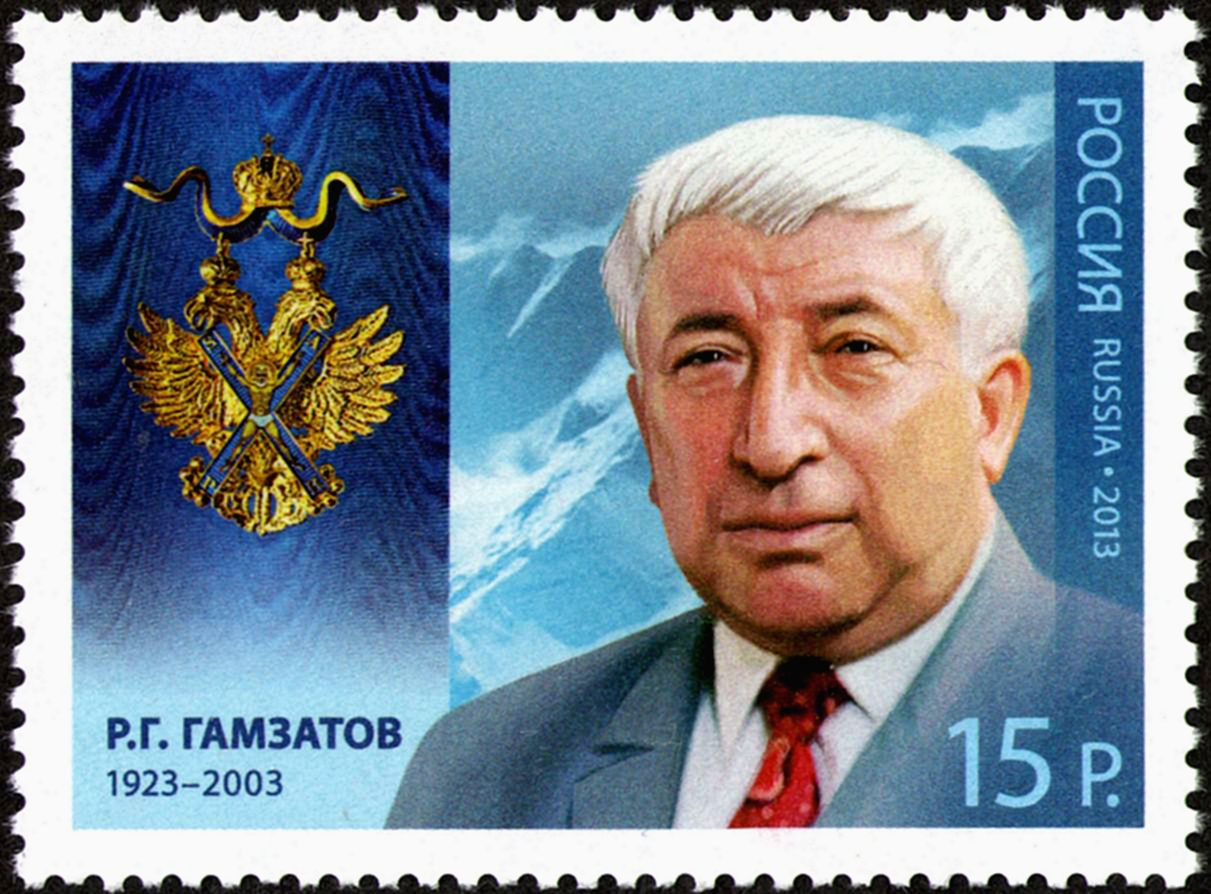
Rasul Gamzatov. 2013: 1709, M:1941.

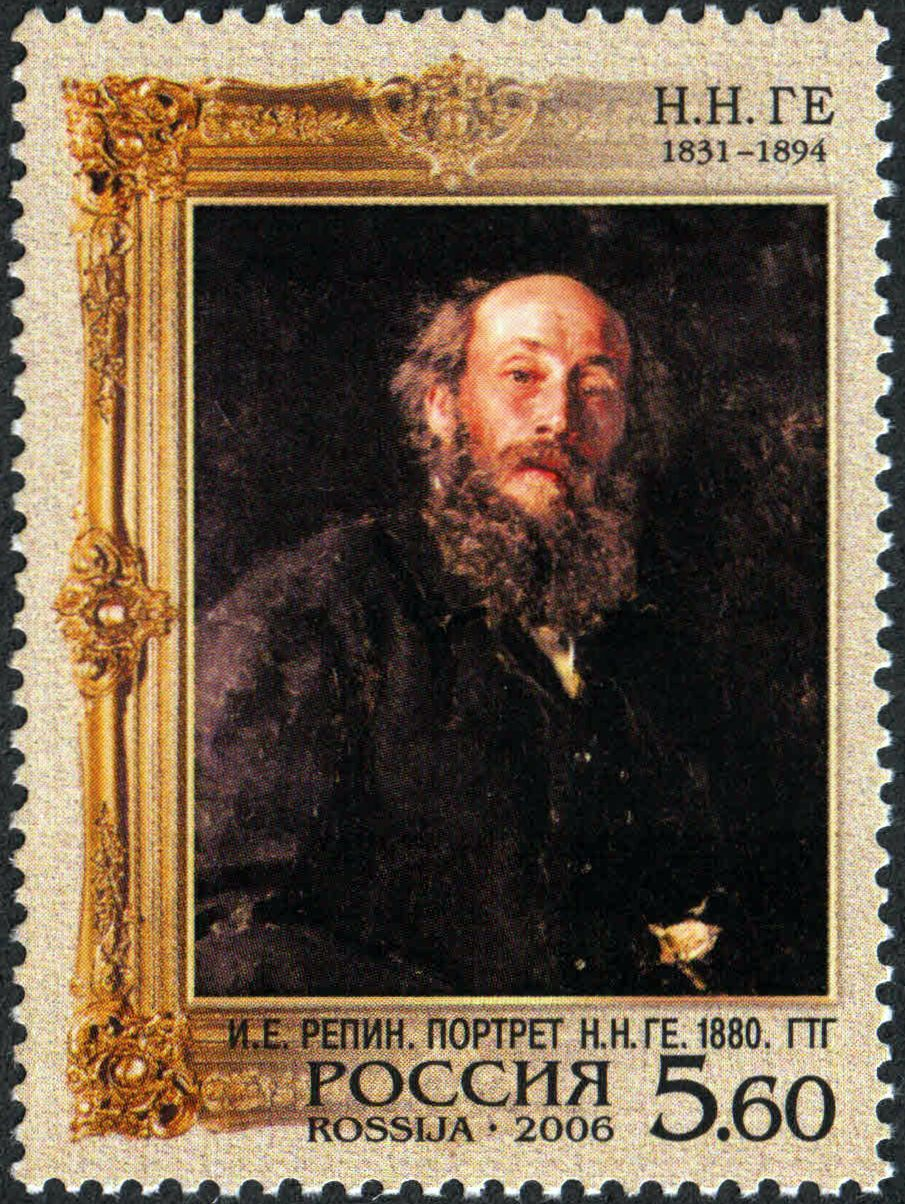
Nikolai Ge. 2006: 1075, M:1307, S:6942. Portrait of N. Ge by Ilya Repin. 1880.

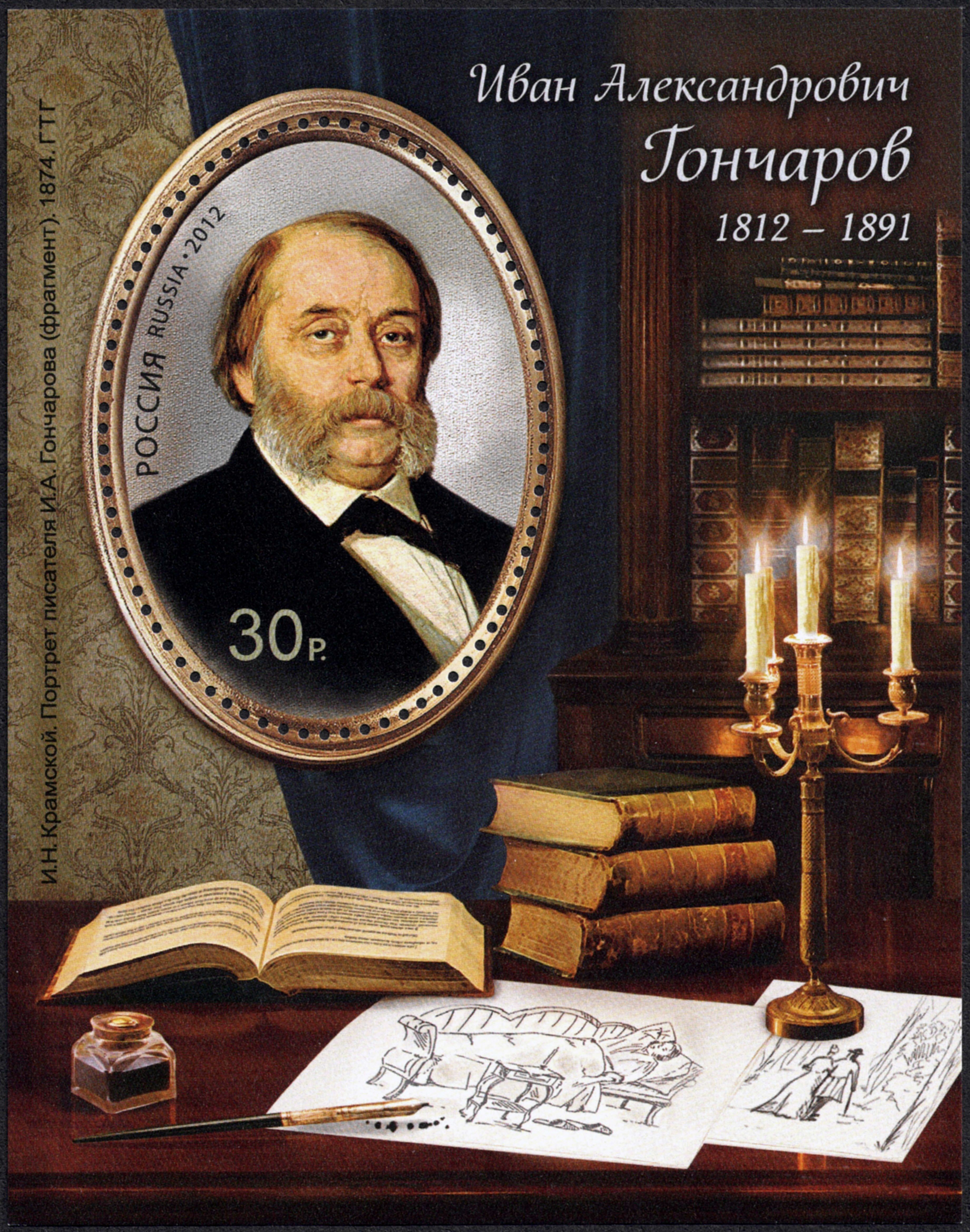
Ivan Goncharov. 2012: 1594, M:1826 (Block164). Portrait of I. Goncharov by I. Kramskoi. 1874.

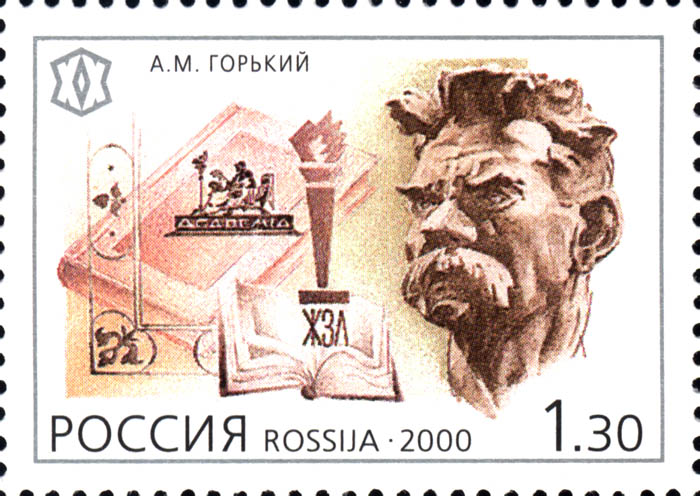
Maxim Gorky. 2000: 620, M:852, S:6606d.

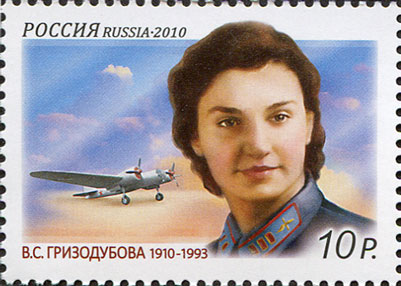
Valentina Grizodubova. 2010: 1386, M:1618.

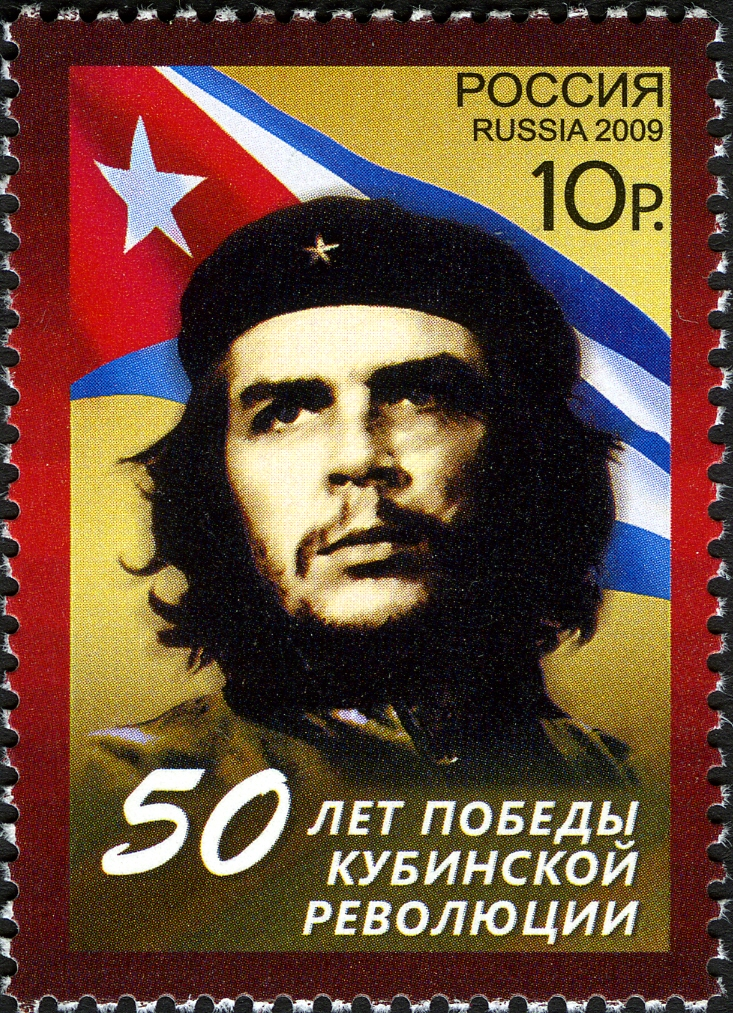
Ernesto “Che” Guevara. 2009: 1298, M:1530.

== I ==
- Vladimir Istomin (1809, Lipovka village, Penza Guberniya – 1855, Sevastopol, Russian Empire), a Russian naval officer, a Rear Admiral of the Imperial Russian Navy, a hero of the Siege of Sevastopol. 2009: 1373, M:1605.
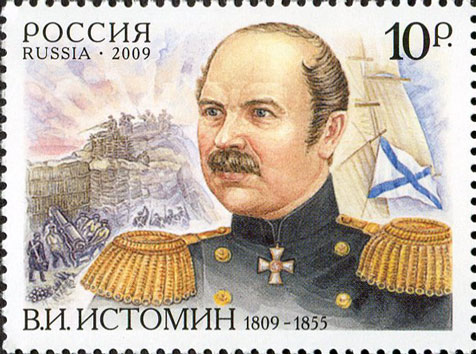
Vladimir Istomin. 2009: 1373, М:1605.

== K ==
- Mstislav Keldysh (1911, Riga, Russian Empire – 1978, Moscow), a Soviet scientist in the field of mathematics and mechanics, one of the key figures behind the Soviet space program, President of the USSR Academy of Sciences (1961–1975). Hero of Socialist Labor (1956, 1961, 1971). 2011: 1462, M:1694.
- Orest Kiprensky (1782, Koporye, near Saint Petersburg – 1836, Rome, Italy), a Russian painter and graphic artist, a master of portraiture. 2007: 1165, M:1397.
- Anatoli Koni (Russian: Анатолий Фёдорович Кони; 1844, Saint Petersburg – 1927, Leningrad), a Russian lawyer, a judge, a member of the State Council of the Russian Empire, a public speaker and a prose writer. 2012: 1631, M:1863.
- Konstantin Korovin (1861, Moscow – 1939, Paris, France), a Russian artist, a leading Russian Impressionist painter also known as a prose writer. 2011: 1544, M:1776 (Block155).
- Mikhail Koshkin (1898, Brynchagi village, Uglich Uyezd – 1940, health resort Zvanki, Kharkiv Oblast, USSR), a Soviet tank designer, the chief designer of the T-34 medium tank. Hero of Socialist Labour (1990). 1998: 475, M:696, S:6487.
- Gleb Kotelnikov (1872, Saint Petersburg – 1944, Moscow), a Russian and Soviet engineer, a designer of parachute equipment, the inventor of knapsack parachute. Gleb Kotelnikov was also known as a theater actor. 2012: 1619, M:1851.
- Ivan Kramskoi (1837, Ostrogozhsk – 1887, Saint Petersburg), a Russian painter and art critic, one of founders and an intellectual leader of the art group Peredvizhniki. 2012: 1592, M:1824.
- Nikolai Kryuchkov (1911, Moscow –1994, Moscow), a Soviet Russian film and theater actor. Hero of Socialist Labour (1980). 2001: 704, M:936, S:6659.
- Adolph Theodor Kupffer (1799, Mitau, Russian Empire – 1865, Saint Petersburg), a German-Baltic physicist and chemist, a metrologist, the founder of the Depot of Standard Weights and Measures in Saint Petersburg and the Main Physical Observatory of Russia. 2009: 1316, M:1548.
- Oleg Kutafin (Russian: Олег Емельянович Кутафин; 1937, Odessa, USSR – 2008, Moscow), a Soviet and Russian jurist, an authority in the field of constitutional law. 2012: 1601, M:1833.
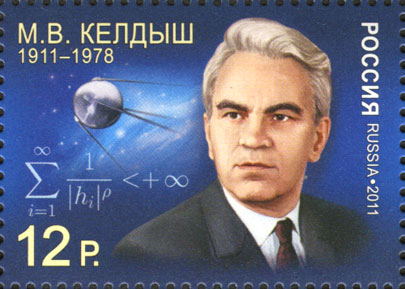
Mstislav Keldysh. 2011: 1462, M:1694.

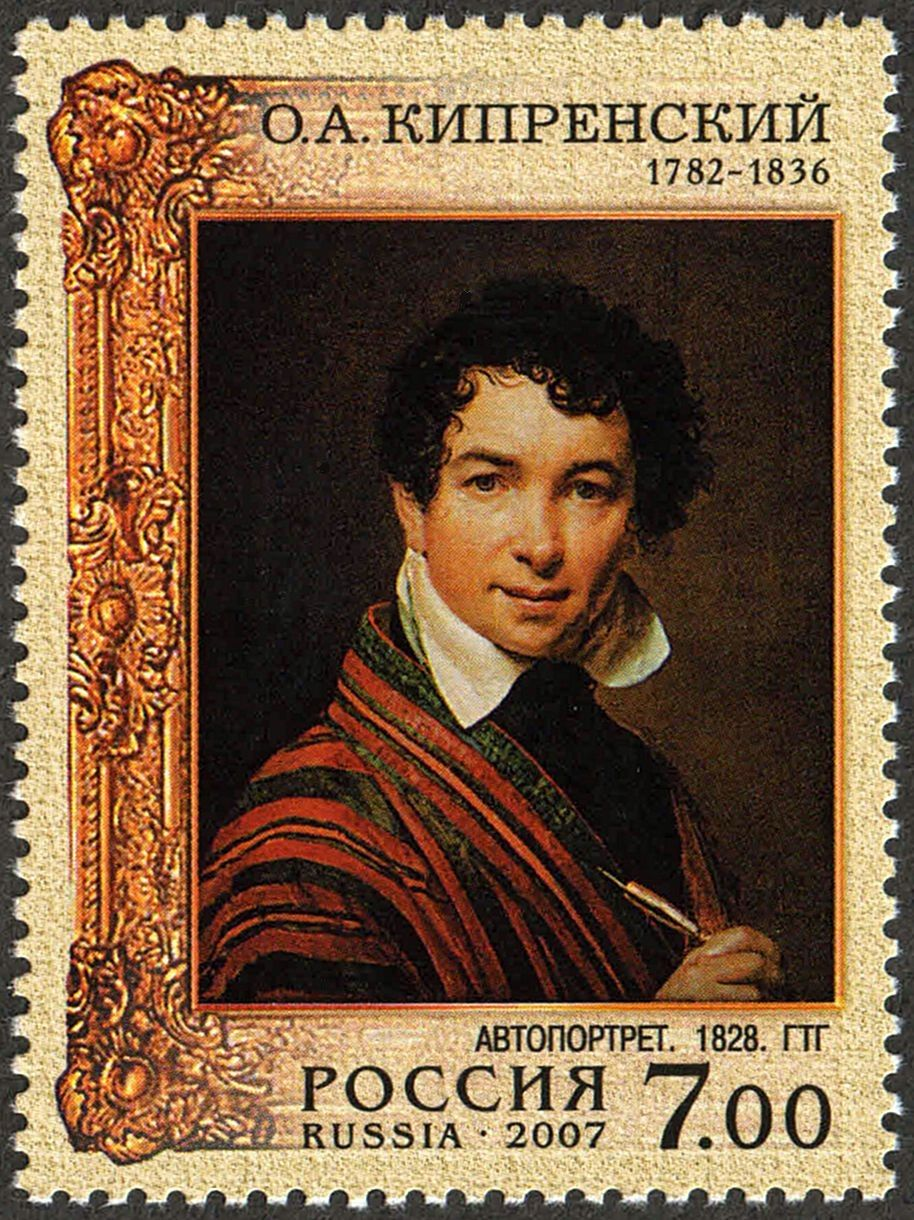
Orest Kiprensky. 2007: 1165, M:1397. The Self-Portrait. 1828.

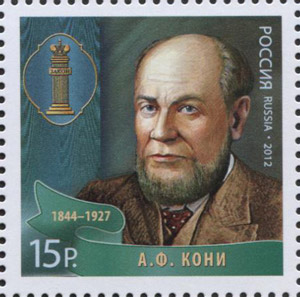
Anatoli Koni. 2012: 1631, M:1863.

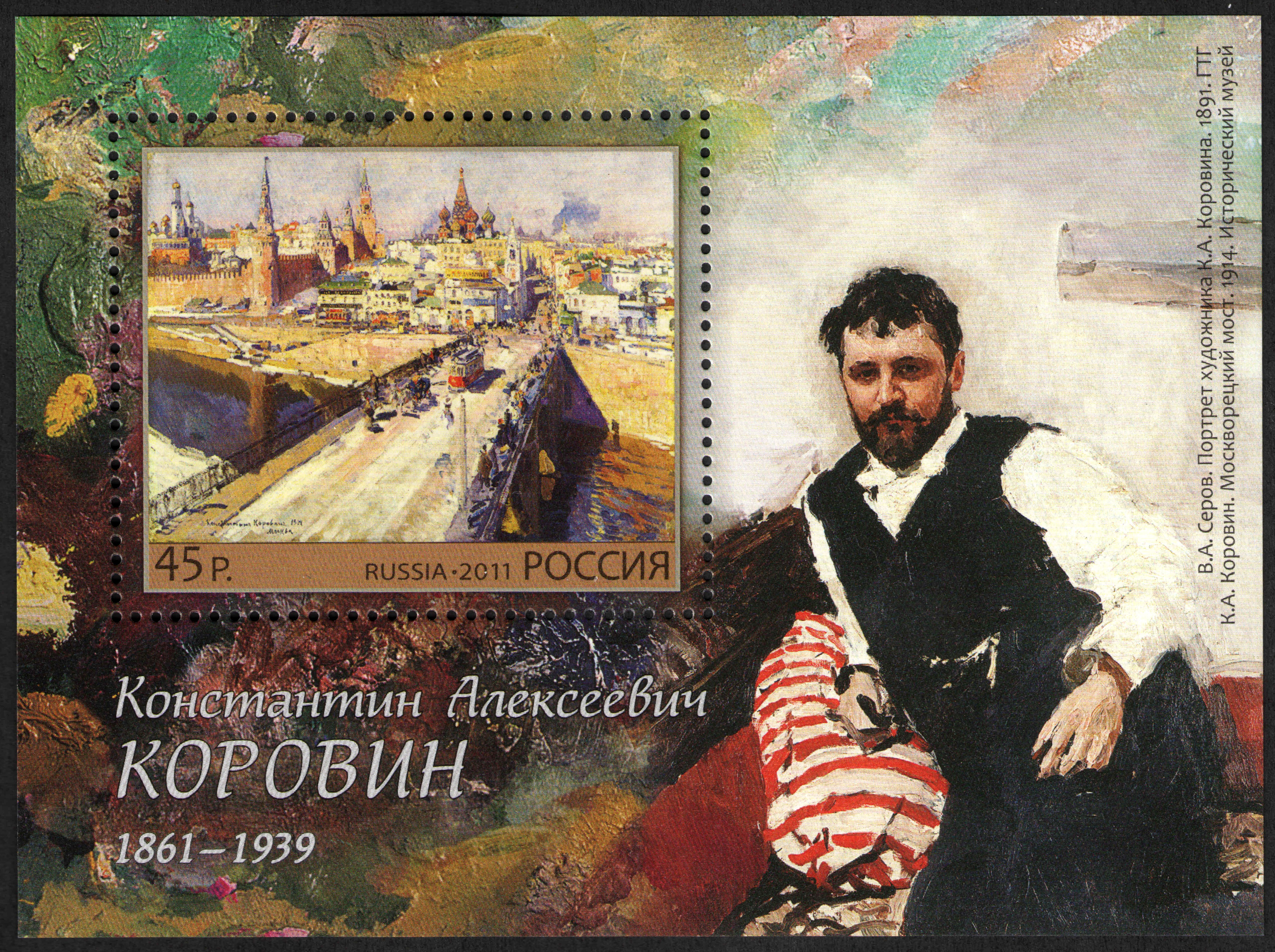
Konstantin Korovin. 2011: 1544, M:1776 (Block155). Portrait of K. Korovin by V. Serov. 1891.

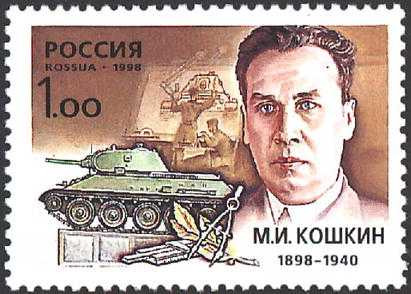
Mikhail Koshkin. 1998: 475, M:696, S:6487.

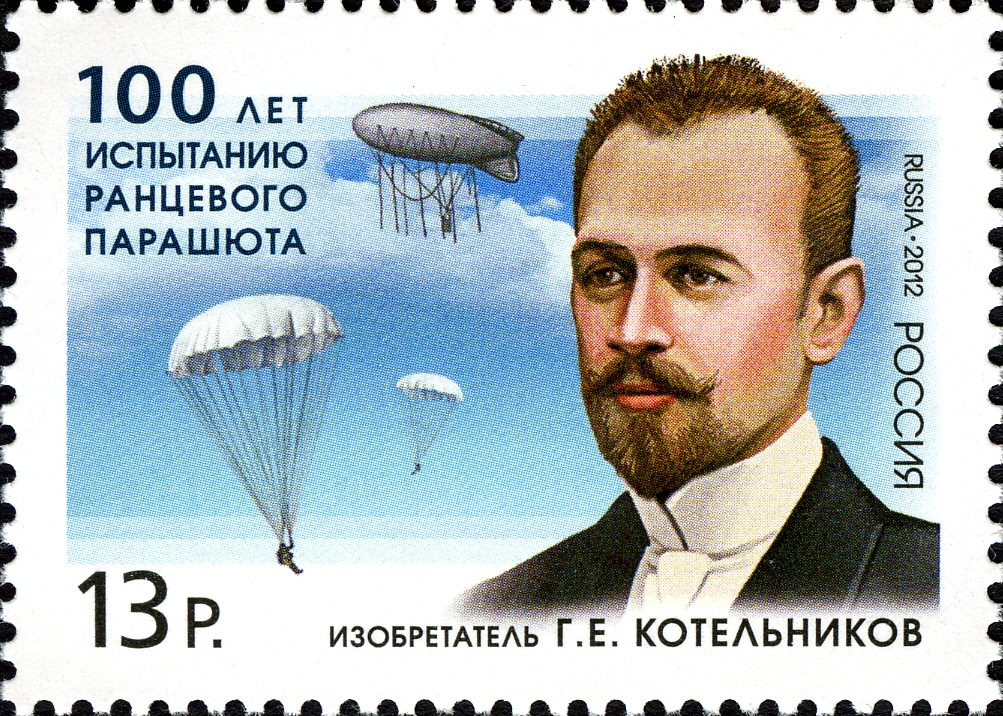
Gleb Kotelnikov. 2012: 1619, M:1851.

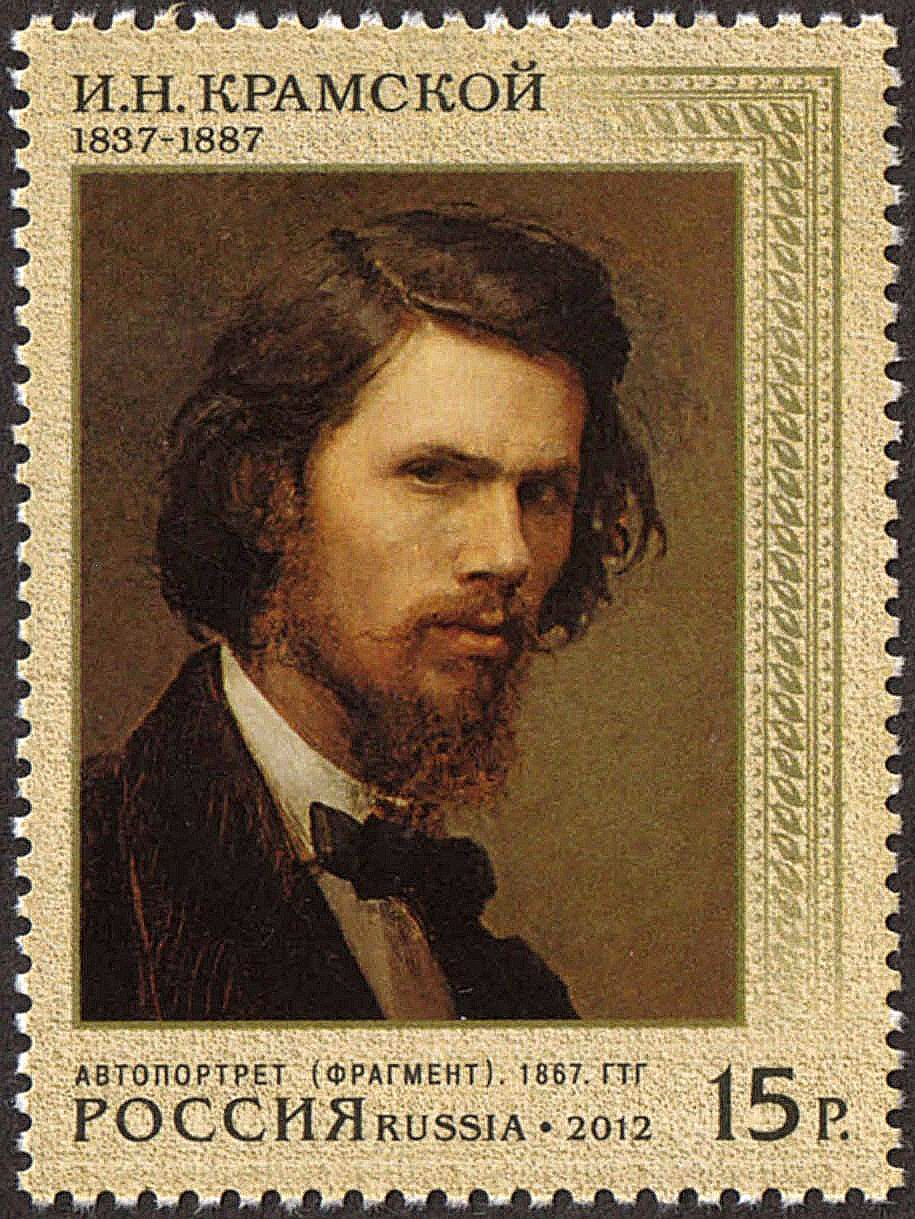
Ivan Kramskoi. 2012: 1592, M:1824. The Self-Portrait. 1867.

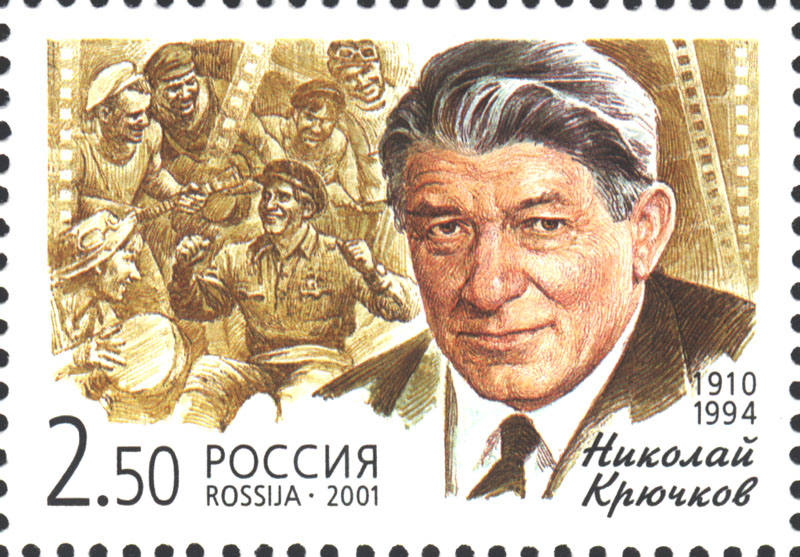
Nikolai Kryuchkov. 2001: 704, M:936, S:6659.

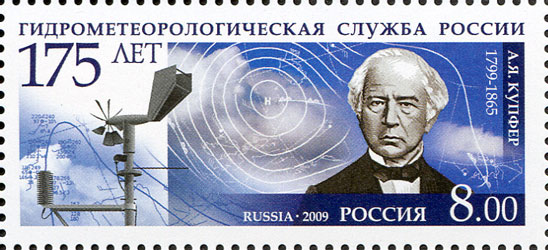
Adolph Theodor Kupffer. 2009: 1316, M:1548.

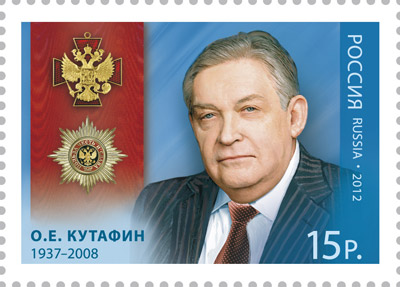
Oleg Kutafin. 2012: 1601, M:1833.

== L ==
- Lev Landau (1908, Baku, Russian Empire – 1968, Moscow), a prominent Soviet physicist, the founder of a school of thought, a winner of Nobel Prize in Physics in 1962 for development of a mathematical theory of superfluidity. Hero of Socialist Labour (1954). 2008: 1218, M:1450.
- Grigory Langsdorff (1754, Wöllstein, Germany –1852, Freiburg im Breisgau, Germany), a Prussian and Russian ethnologist, a naturalist, a physician, and a diplomat, an explorer of Brasília. 1992: 31, M:250, S:6089.
- Yevgeny Leonov (1926, Moscow – 1994, Moscow), a Soviet Russian film and theater actor. 2001: 707, M:939, S:6662.
- Dmitry Levitzky (1735, Kiev, Russian Empire – 1822, Saint Petersburg), a Ukrainian-born Russian portrait painter. 2010: 1416, M:1648.
- Dmitry Likhachov (1906, Saint Petersburg – 1999, Saint Petersburg), an outstanding Soviet and Russian philologist, art historian, literary man and public figure; he was considered the world's foremost expert in Old Russian language and literature. Hero of Socialist Labor (1986). 2000: 628, M:860, S:6606l; 2006: 1146, M:1378; 2011: 1509, M:1741.
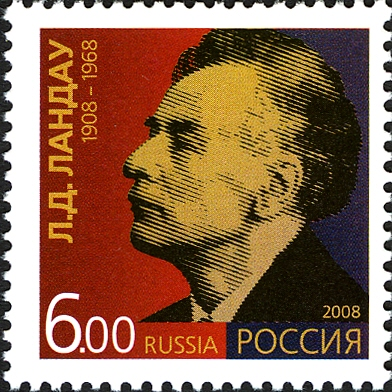
Lev Landau. 2008: 1218, M:1450.

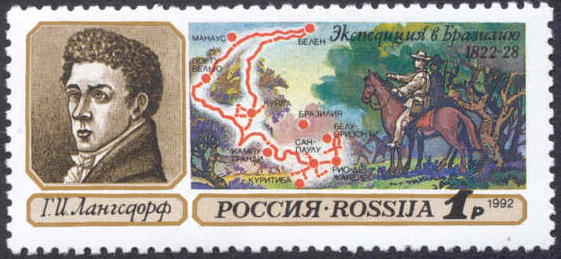
Grigory Langsdorff. 1992: 31, M:250, S:6089.

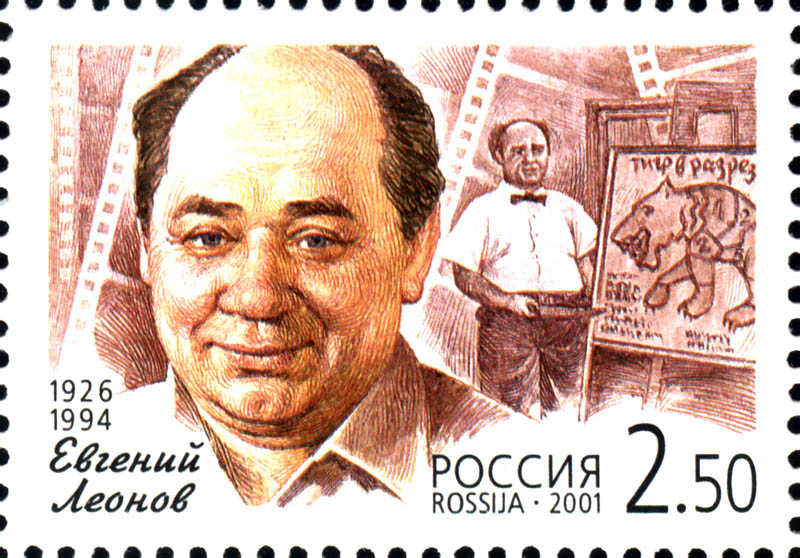
Yevgeny Leonov. 2001: 707, M:939, S:6662.

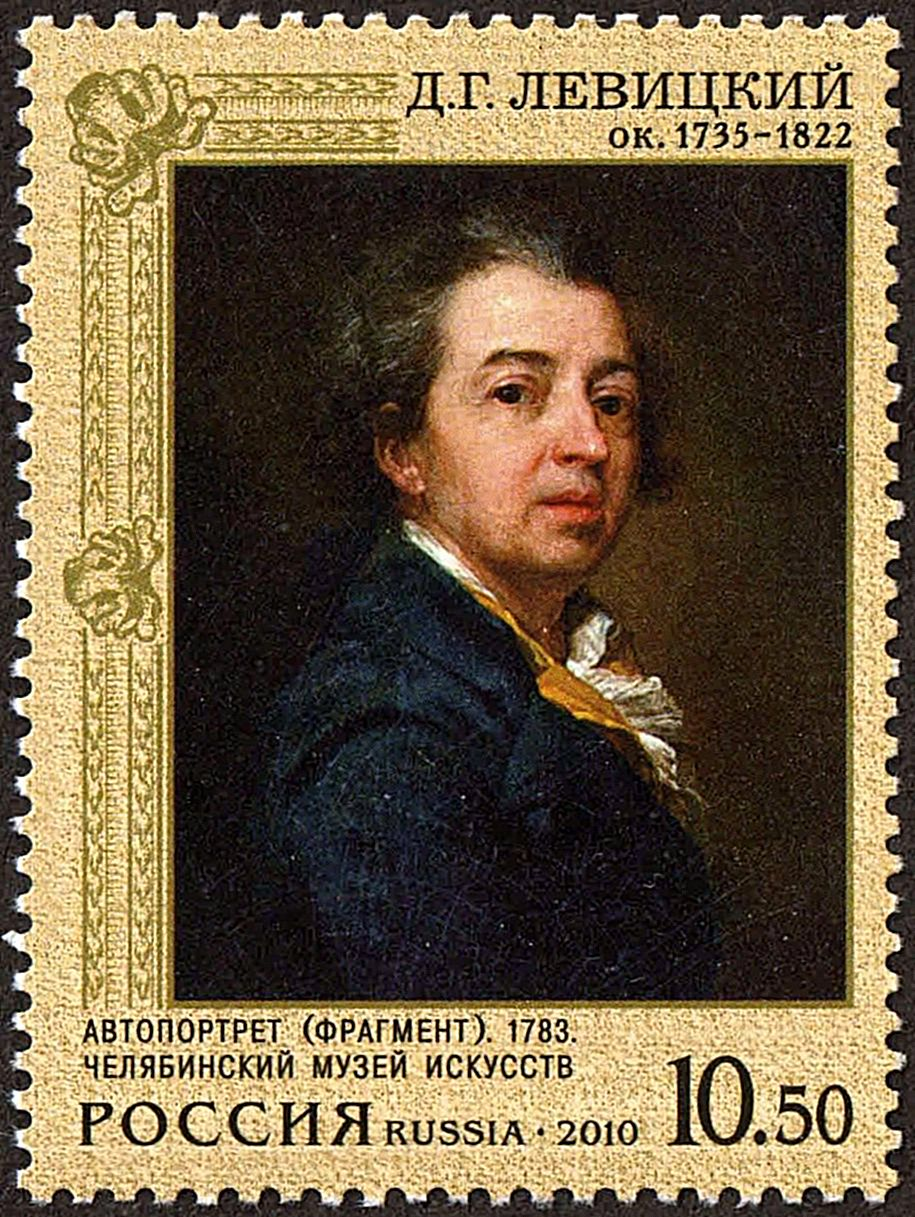
Dmitry Levitzky. 2010: 1416, M:1648. The Self-Portrait. 1783

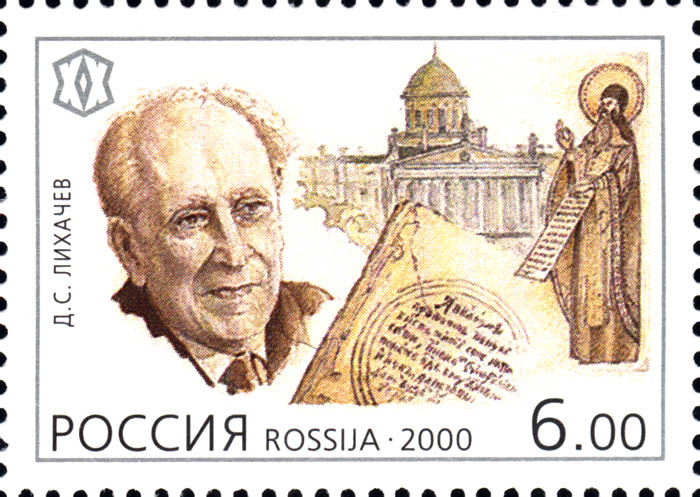
Dmitry Likhachov. 2000: 628, M:860, S:6606l.

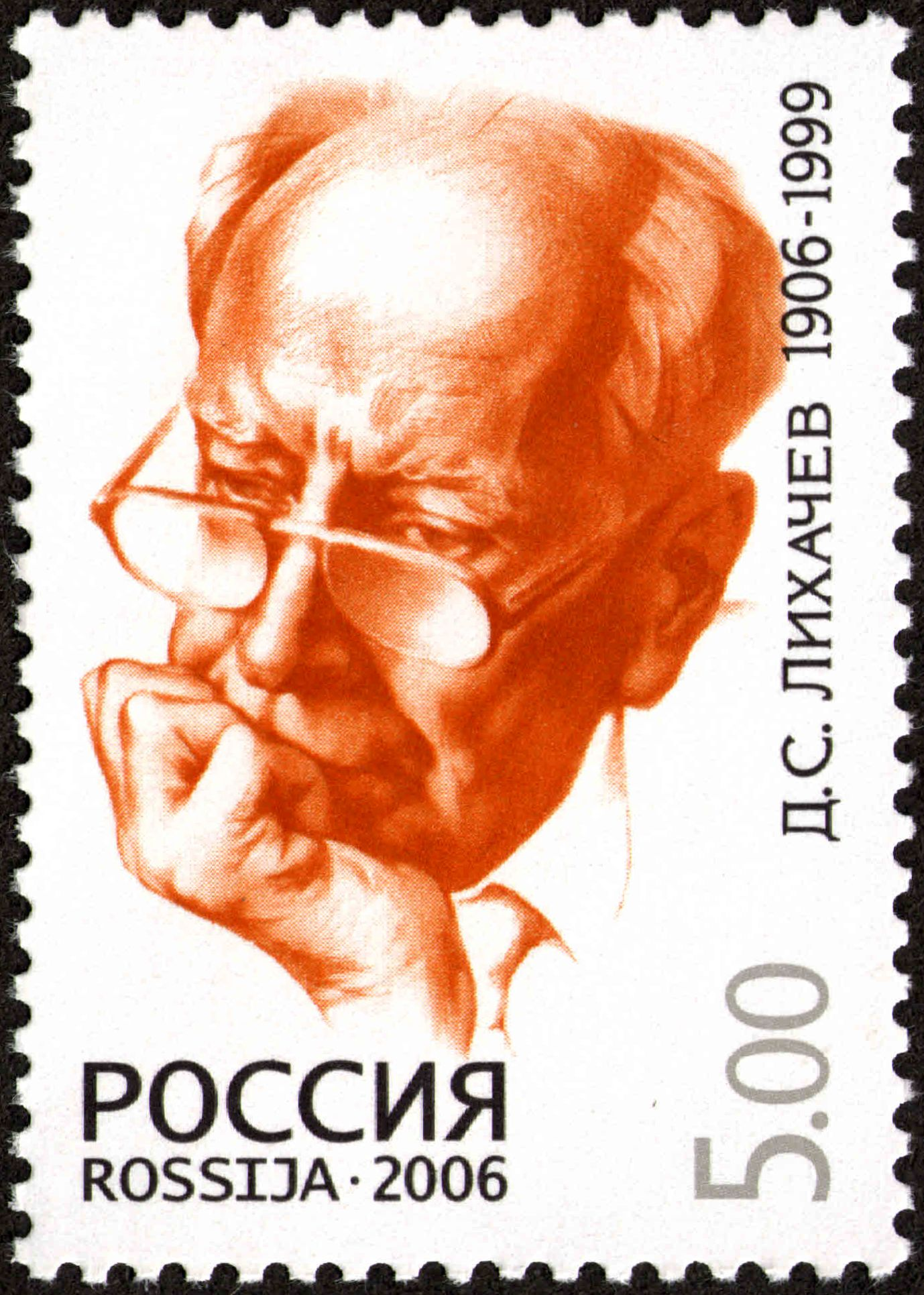
Dmitry Likhachov. 2006: 1146, M:1378.

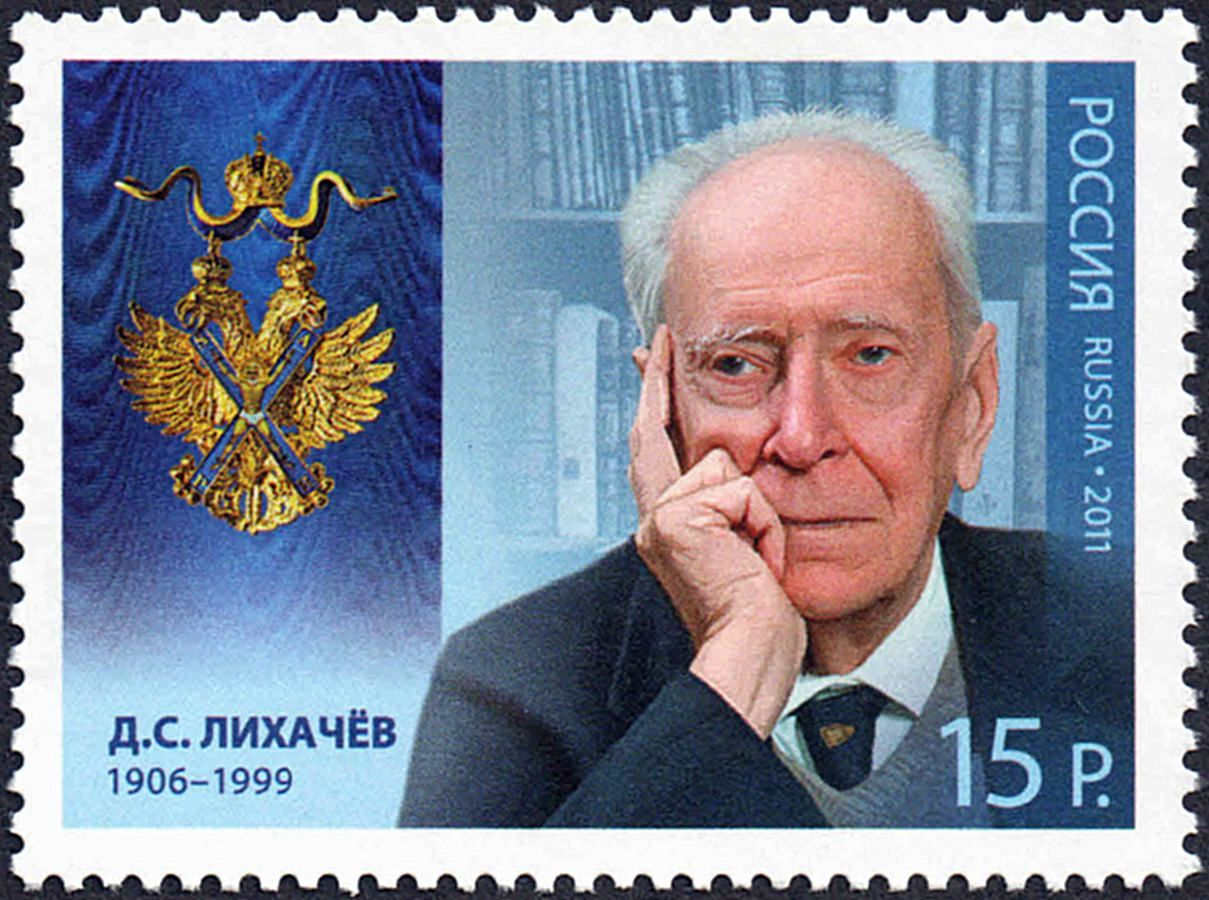
Dmitry Likhachov. 2011: 1509, M:1741.

== M ==
- Maria Alexandrovna (1824, Darmstadt, Grand Duchy of Hesse – 1880, Saint Petersburg), a princess of the Grand Duchy of Hesse, Empress consort of Alexander II of Russia (1855–1880). 2011: 1463, M:1695 (Block143)
- Vsevolod Meyerhold (1874, Penza – 1940, Moscow), a Russian and Soviet actor and theatre director, a theorist of the theatrics, the creator of the system of actor training known as the Theatrical Biomechanics. 2000: 623, M:855, S:6606g.
- Sergey Mikhalkov (1913, Moscow – 2009, Moscow), a Soviet Russian poet, prose writer, dramatist and a public figure. Hero of Socialist Labour (1973). 2013: 1737, M:1969.
- Nicholas Miklouho-Maclay (1846, Yazykovo-Rozhdestevenskoe village, Borovichi Uyezd, Novgorod Guberniya – 1888, Saint Petersburg), a Russian ethnologist, anthropologist and biologist, an explorer of Oceania, Southeast Asia and Australia. 1992: 30, M:249, S:6088.
- Andrei Mironov (1941, Moscow – 1987, Riga, USSR), a Soviet Russian film and theater actor and a singer. 2001: 709, M:941, S:6664.
- Ekaterina Alekseevna Musina-Pushkina (Russian: Екатерина Алексеевна Мусина-Пушкина; 1754–1829, Moscow) a member of the Russian nobility, a countess, the second daughter of Prince Aleksey Nikitich Volkonsky (?–1781) and Margarita Rodionovna Volkonskaya (née Kosheleva), the wife of Count Aleksei Ivanovich Musin-Pushkin (1744–1817). 2010: 1395, M:1627.
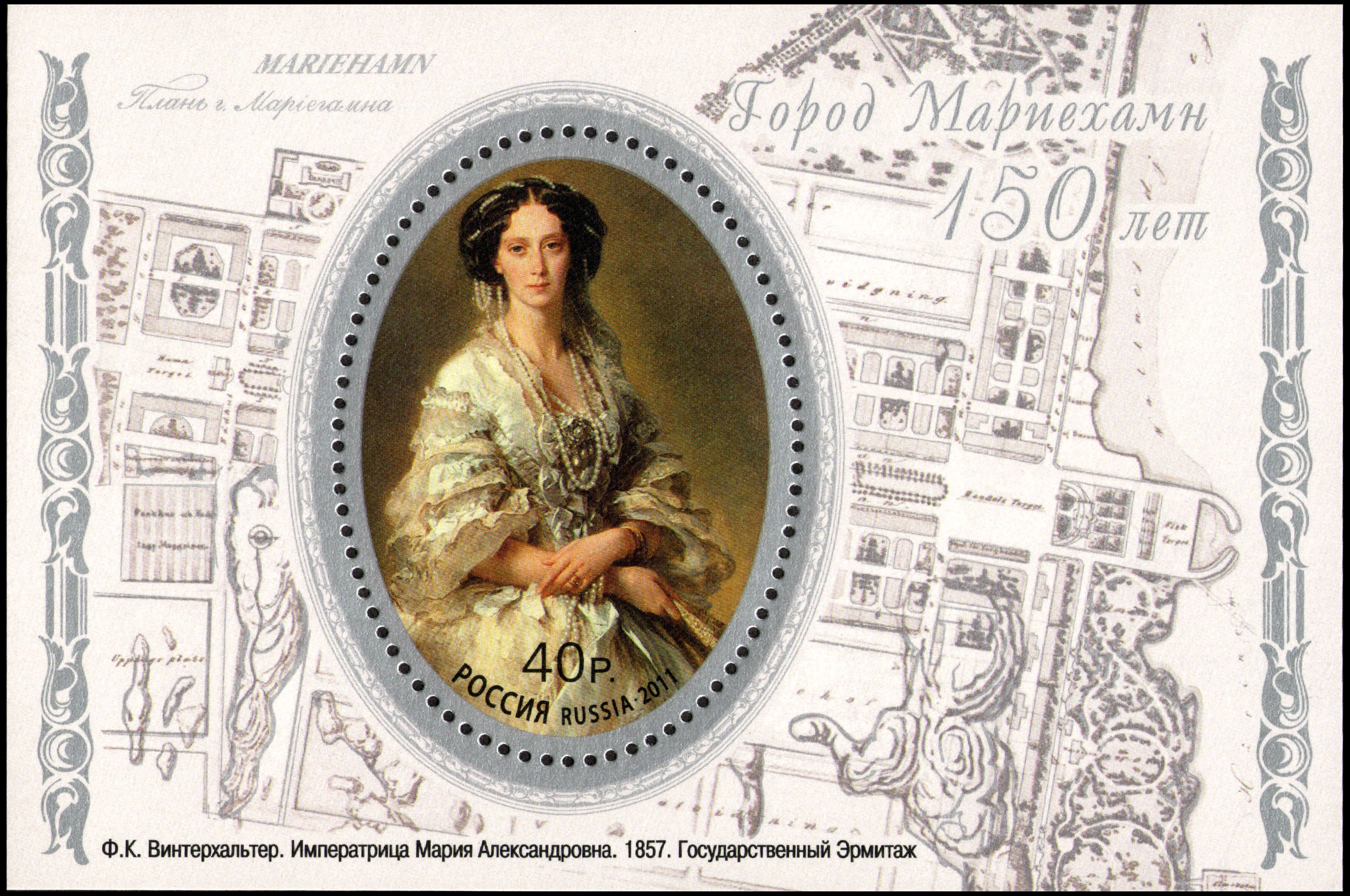
Maria Alexandrovna. 2011: 1463, M:1695 (Block143). Portrait of Empress Maria Alexandrovna by F.X. Winterhalter. 1857.

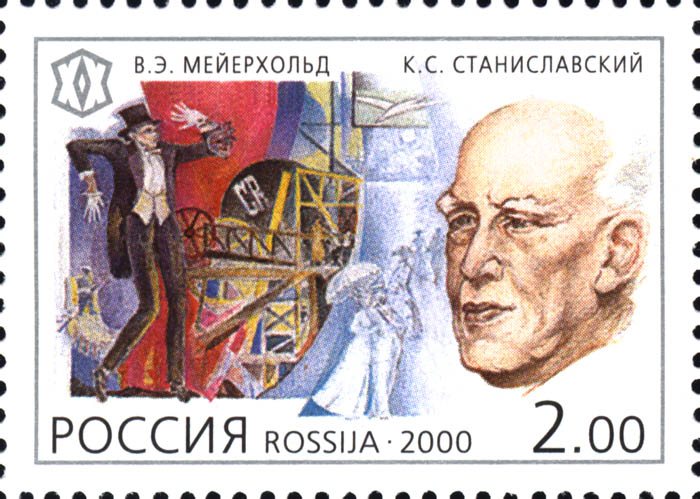
Vsevolod Meyerhold. 2000: 623, M:855, S:6606g. The figure of V. Meyerhold is on the left.

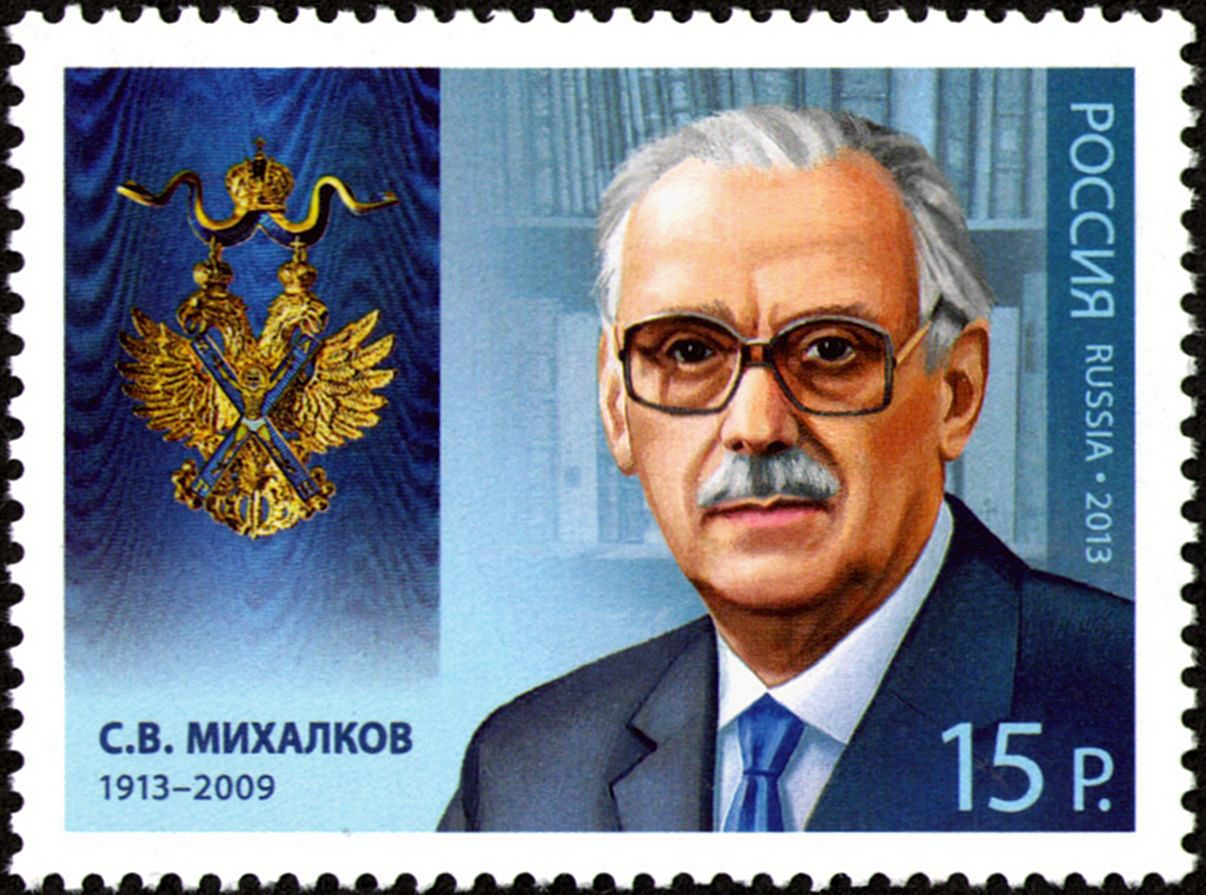
Sergey Mikhalkov. 2013: 1737, M:1969.

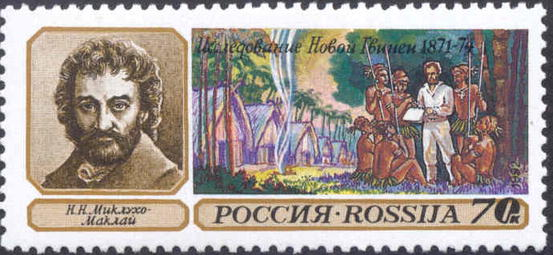
Nicholas Miklouho-Maclay. 1992: 30, M:249, S:6088.

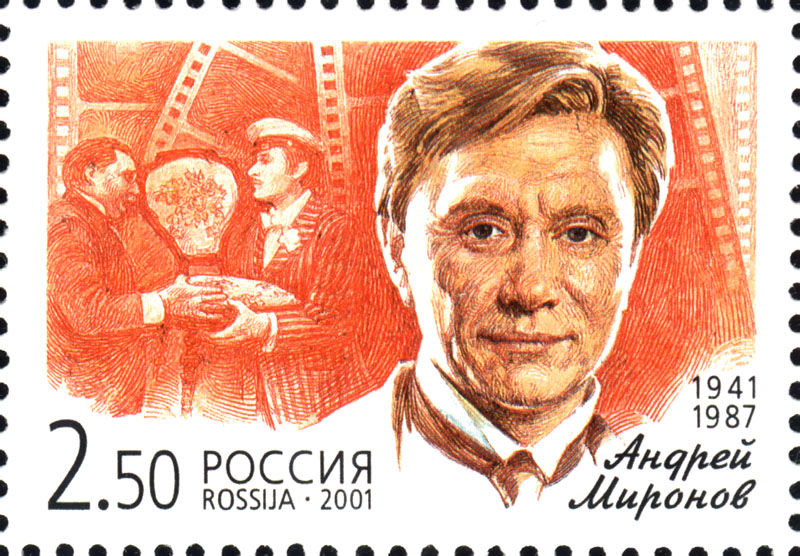
Andrei Mironov.2001: 709, M:941, S:6664.

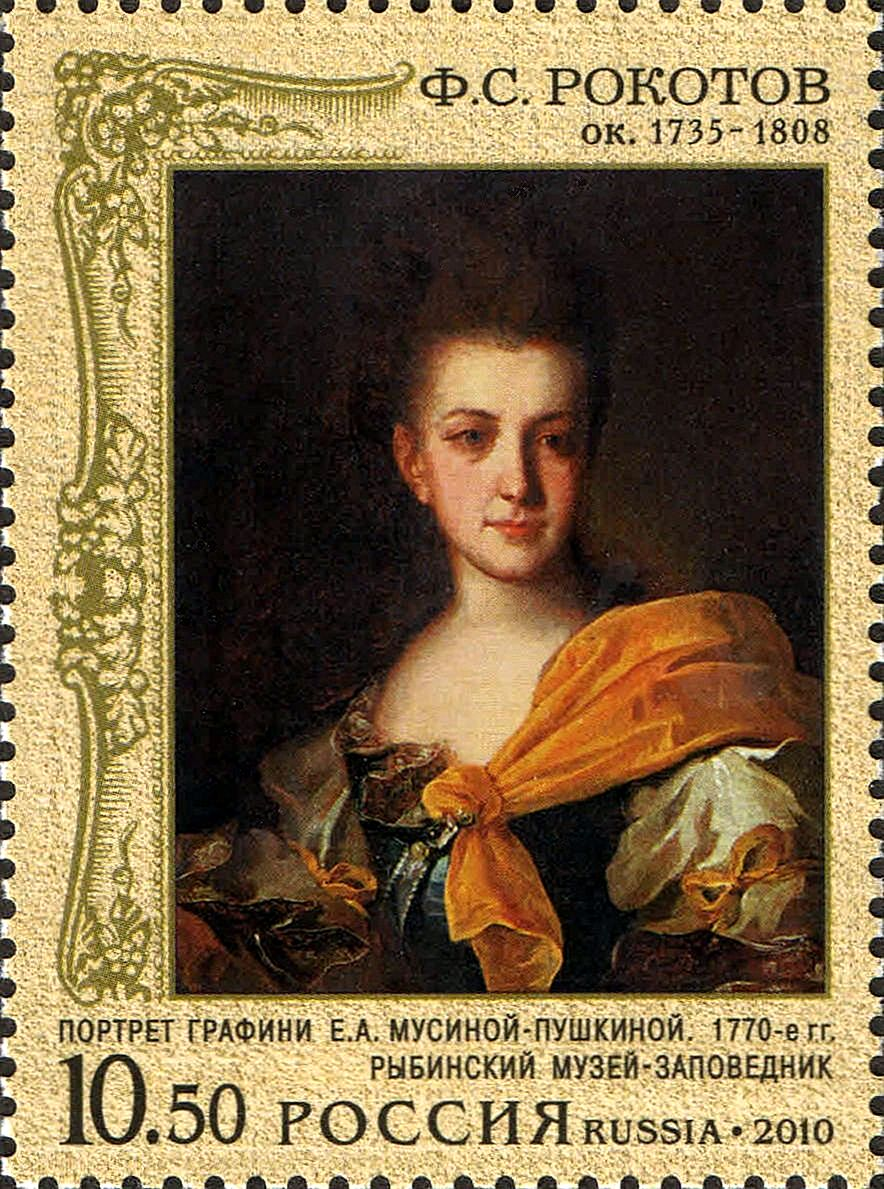
E.A. Musina-Pushkina. 2010: 1395, M:1627. Portrait of E.A. Musina-Pushkina by Fyodor Rokotov. 1770s.

== N ==
- Mikhail Nesterov (1862, Ufa – 1942, Moscow), a Russian and Soviet painter, a major representative of religious Symbolism in Russian art. 2012: 1591, M:1823 (Block163).
- Pyotr Nesterov (1887, Nizhny Novgorod – 1914, Zhovkva, Kingdom of Galicia and Lodomeria, Austria-Hungary), a Russian pilot, an aircraft technical designer and an aerobatics pioneer, a Stabskapitän of Imperial Russian Army. 2012: 1558, M:1790.
- Yuri Nikulin (1921, Moscow – 1997, Moscow), a Soviet Russian film actor and a circus clown. Hero of Socialist Labour (1990). 2001: 705, M:937, S:6660; 2011: 1515, M:1747.
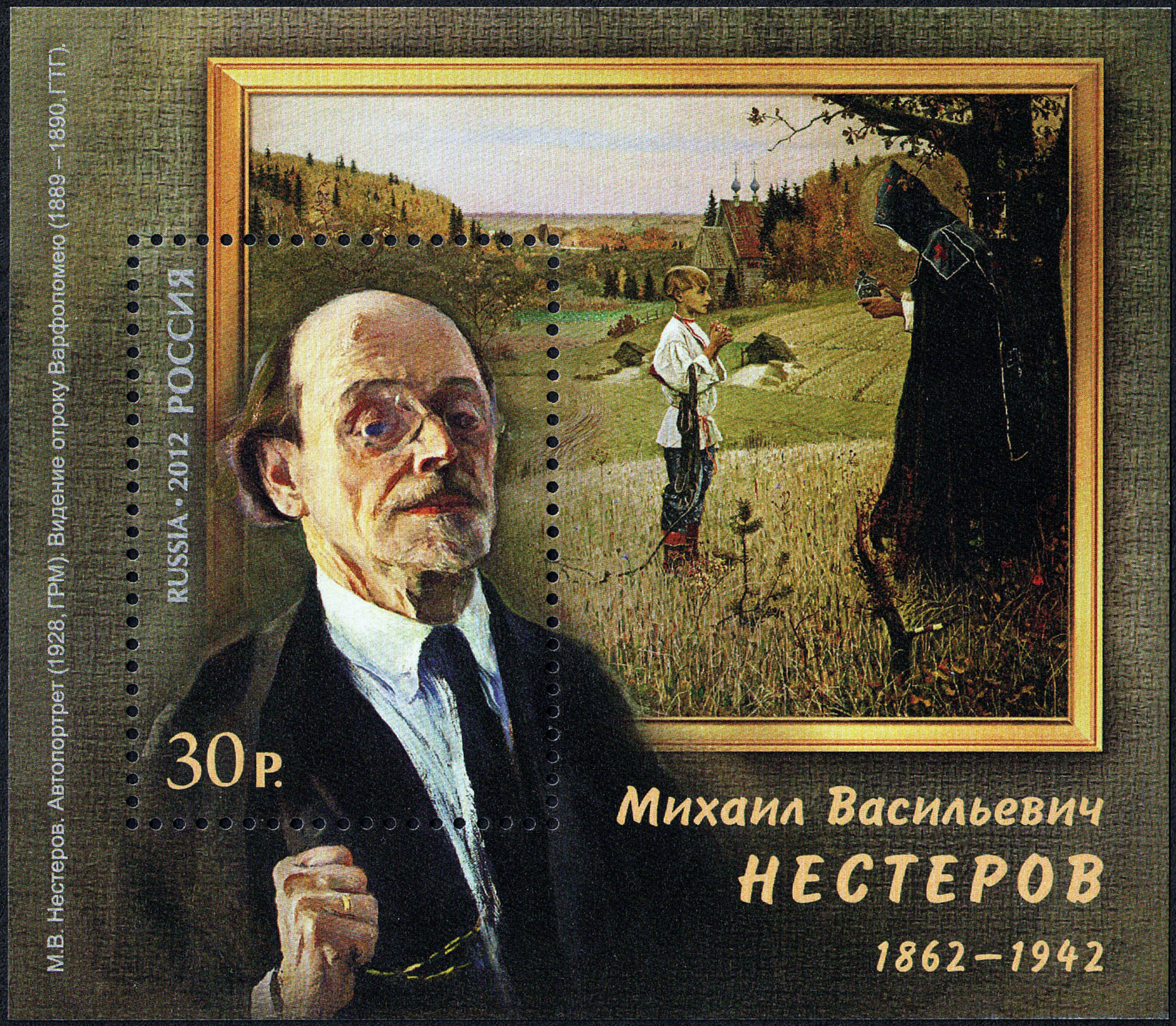
Mikhail Nesterov. 2012: 1591, M:1823 (Block163). The Self-Portrait. 1928

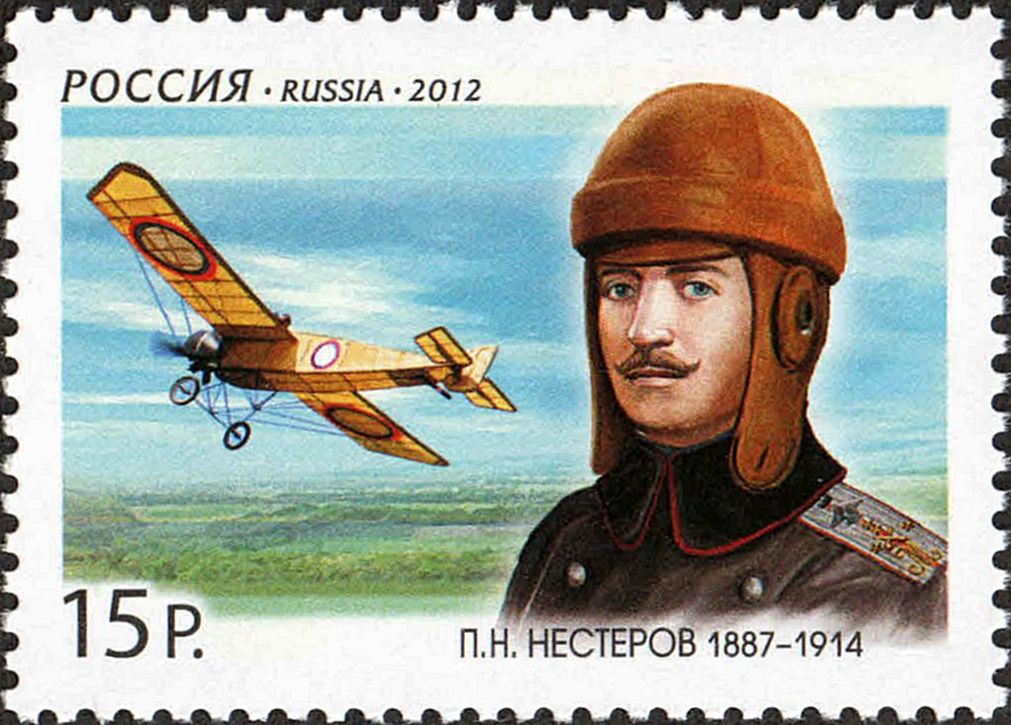
Pyotr Nesterov. 2012: 1558, M:1790.

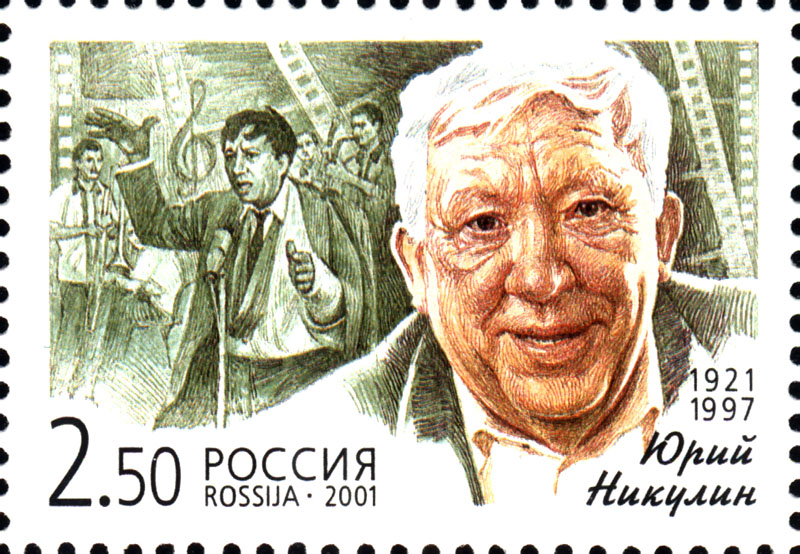
Yuri Nikulin. 2001: 705, M:937, S:6660.

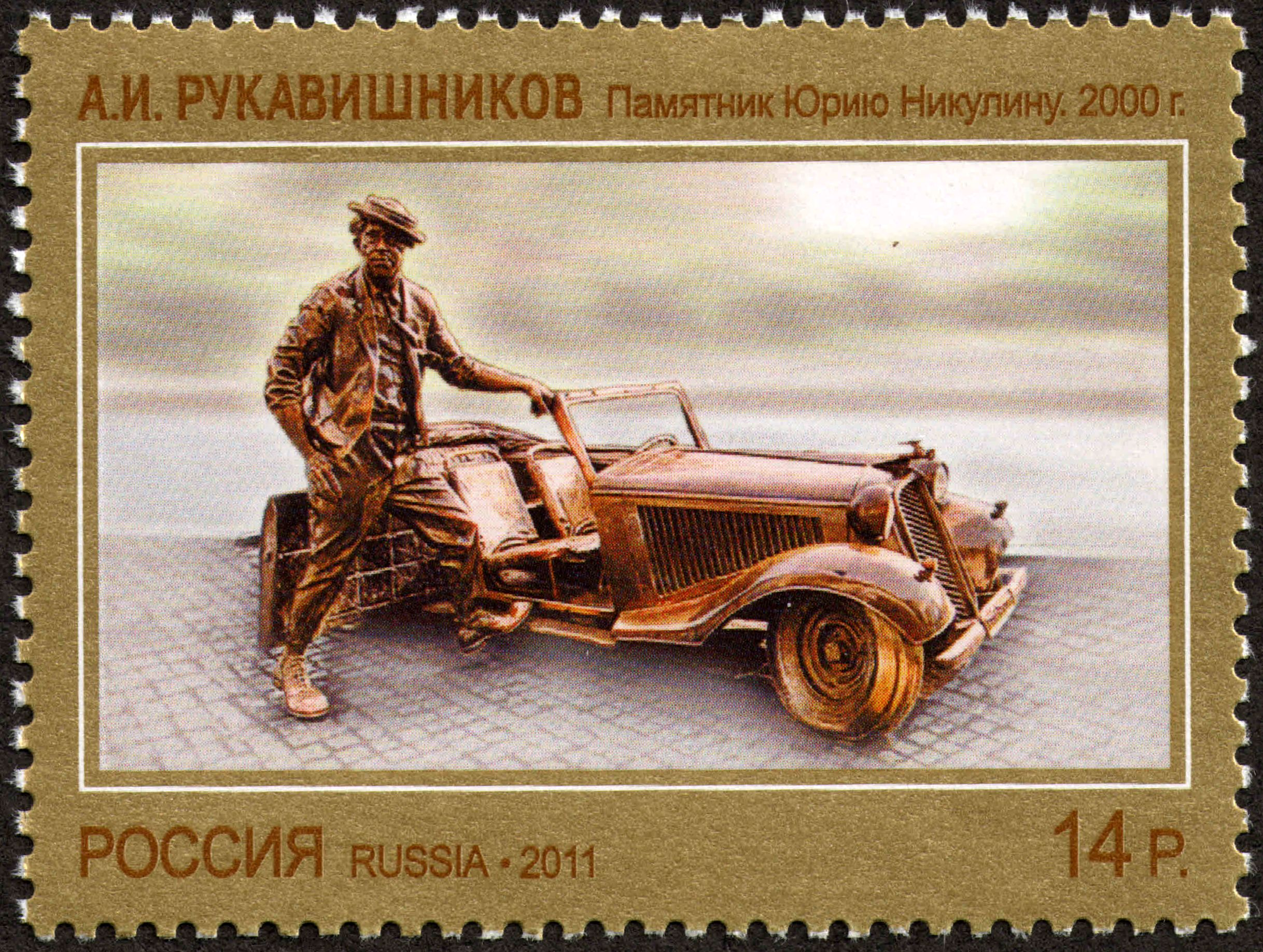
Yuri Nikulin. 2011: 1515, M:1747. The monument to Yu. Nikulin in Moscow by A. Rukavishnikov. 2000.

== O ==
- Afanasy Ordin-Nashchokin (ca. 1605, Pskov – 1680, Pskov), a Russian statesman, a diplomat, the Judge (Governor) of the Posolsky Prikaz (the Ambassadorial Prikaz) in 1667–1671. Afanasy Ordin-Nashchokin is often considered as the founder of the regular postal service in Russia, but this opinion is not quite correct. 2011: 1536, M:1766.
- Vasily Orlov-Denisov (1775, Pyatiizbyanskaya stanitsa, Don Host Oblast – 1843, Kharkov, Russian Empire), a Russian military commander, a General of the Cavalry of the Imperial Russian Army, a participant of the Napoleonic Wars, a commander of the Life-Guards Cossack Regiment (1808–1827), a member of the count family Orlov-Denisov. 2013: 1739, M:1971 (Block193).
- Lyubov Orlova (1902, Zvenigorod – 1975, Moscow), a Soviet Russian film and theater actress, a pianist and a singer. 2001: 703, M:935, S:6658.
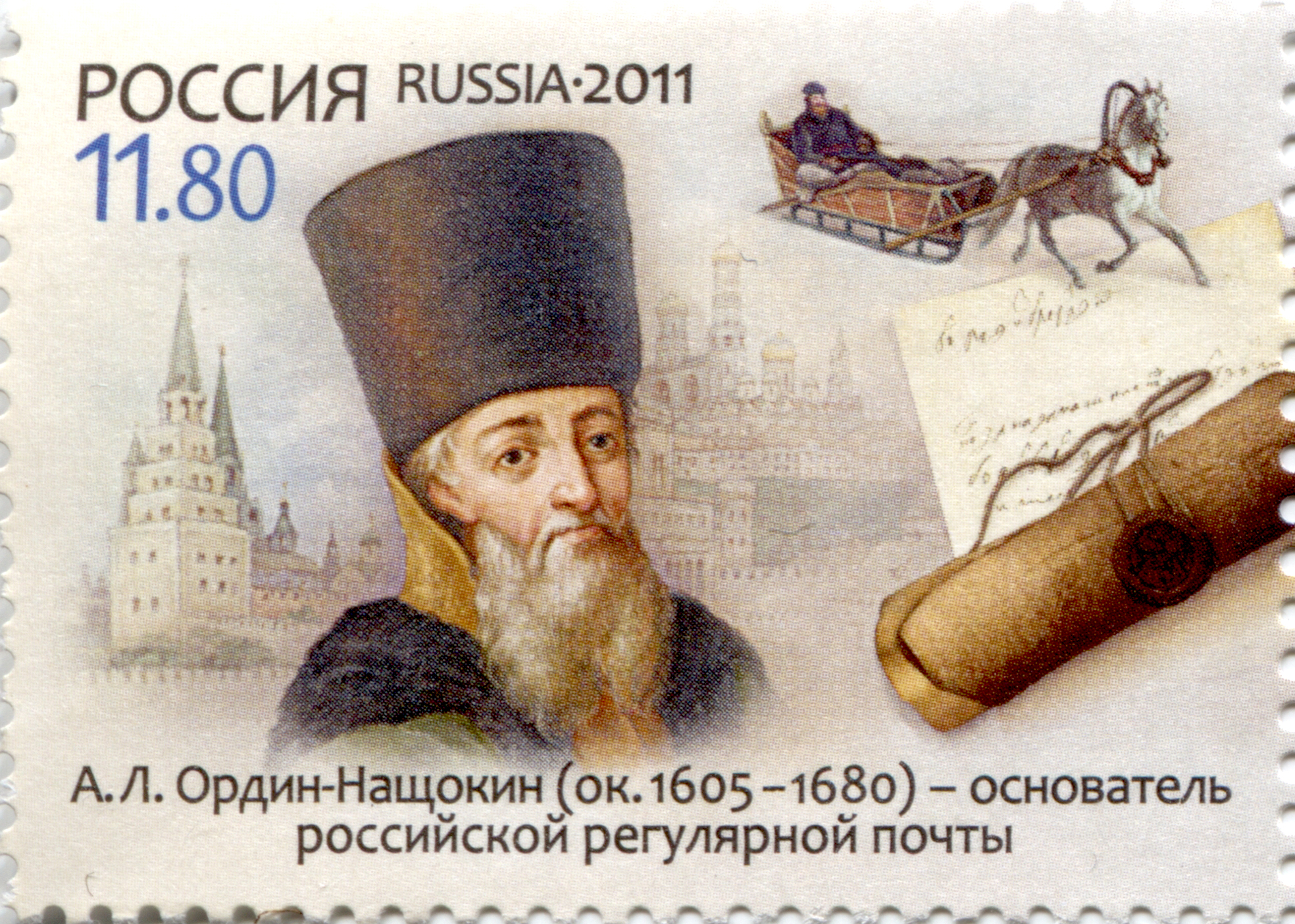
Afanasy Ordin-Nashchokin. 2011: 1536, M:1766.

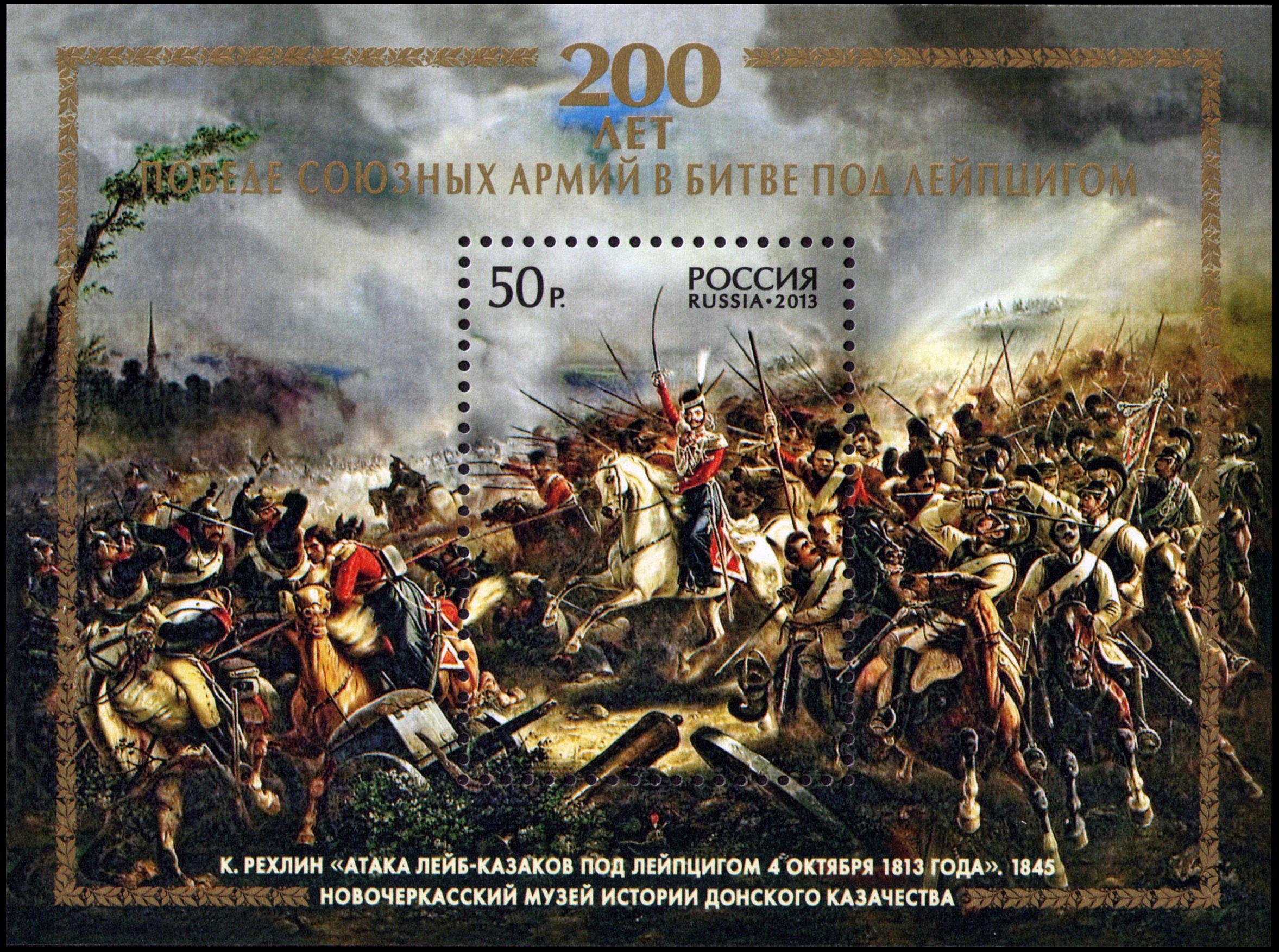
Vasily Orlov-Denisov. 2013: 1739, M:1971 (Block193). V. Orlov-Denisov is in the centre, on the white horse.

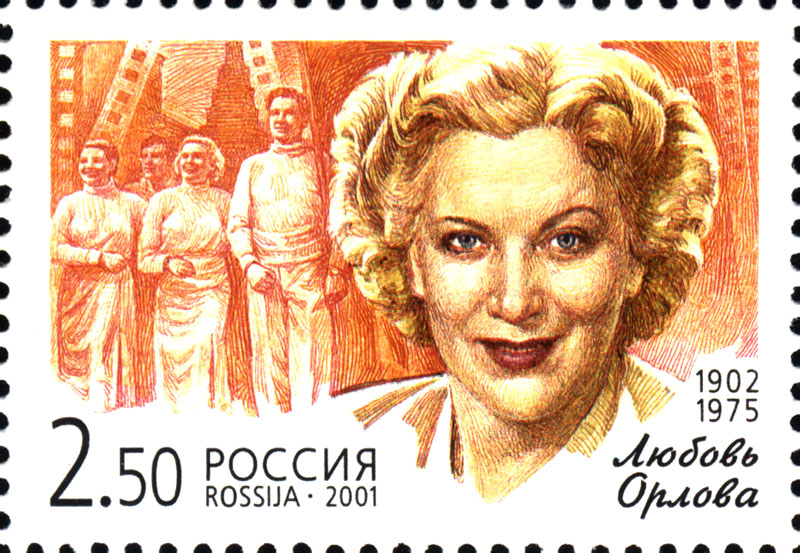
Lyubov Orlova. 2001: 703, M:935, S:6658.

== P ==
- Anatoli Papanov (1922, Vyazma – 1987, Moscow), a Soviet Russian film and theater actor. 2001: 706, M:938, S:6661.
- Vasily Perov (1834, Tobolsk – 1882, Kuzminki village, near Moscow), a Russian painter, one of founders of the art group Peredvizhniki. 2009: 1300, M:1532.
- Boris Petrovsky (Russian: Борис Васильевич Петровский; 1912, Yessentuki – 2004, Moscow), a Soviet and Russian surgeon, a statesman, a Full Member of the USSR Academy of Sciences and of USSR Academy of Medical Sciences, the Minister of Health of the USSR in 1965–1980. Hero of Socialist Labor (1968). 2011: 1510, M:1742.
- Nikolay Pirogov (1810, Moscow – 1881, Vishnya village, near Vinnytsia, Russian Empire), a prominent Russian scientist, a physician and a surgeon, one of the founders of battlefield medicine, one of the pioneers of anesthesia, a pedagogue. 2010: 1459, M:1691 (Block142).
- Alexander Pokryshkin (1913, Novonikolaevsk – 1985, Moscow), a Soviet military aviator, a World War II fighter ace; a thrice Hero of the Soviet Union (1943, 1943, 1944), a Marshal of the Soviet Air Forces (1972). 2013: 1675, M:1907; 1742, M:1974.
- Fedor Plevako (1842, Troitsk – 1908, Moscow), Russian jurist, advocate, and legal orator. 2013:
- Aleksey Putsykin (Russian: Алексей Викторович Пуцыкин; 1980, Limanskoe, USSR – 2008, near Java, South Ossetia), a Senior Lieutenant of the Armed Forces of the Russian Federation, an officer of 234th Guards Airborne Regiment of 76th Air Assault Division, was killed in action during the 2008 South Ossetia war. Hero of the Russian Federation (2008, posthumously). 2012: 1587, M:1819.
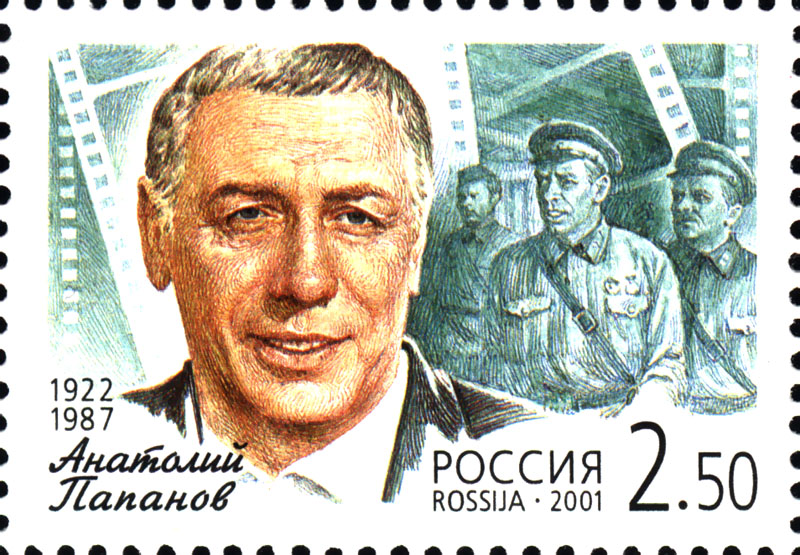
Anatoli Papanov. 2001: 706, M:938, S:6661.

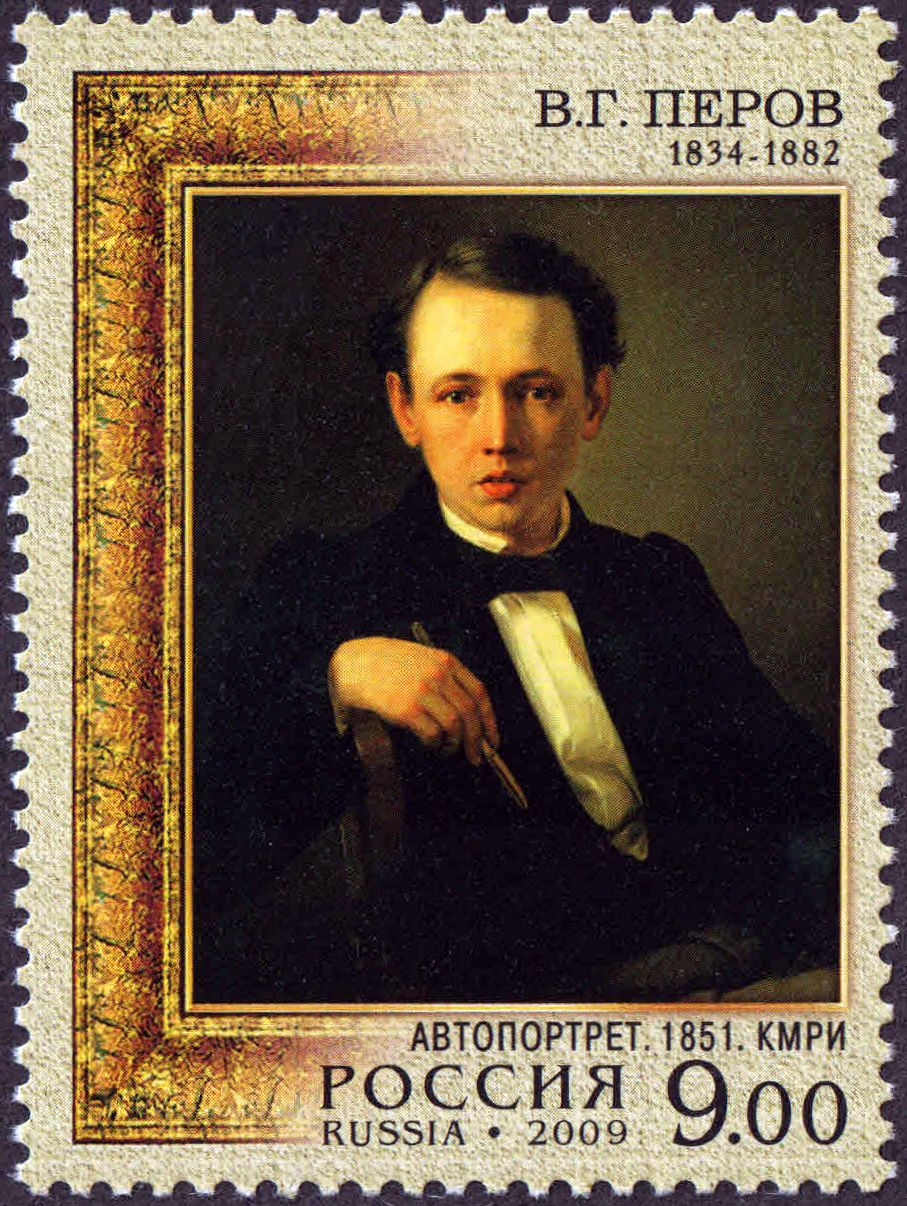
Vasily Perov. 2009: 1300, M:1532. The Self-Portrait. 1851.

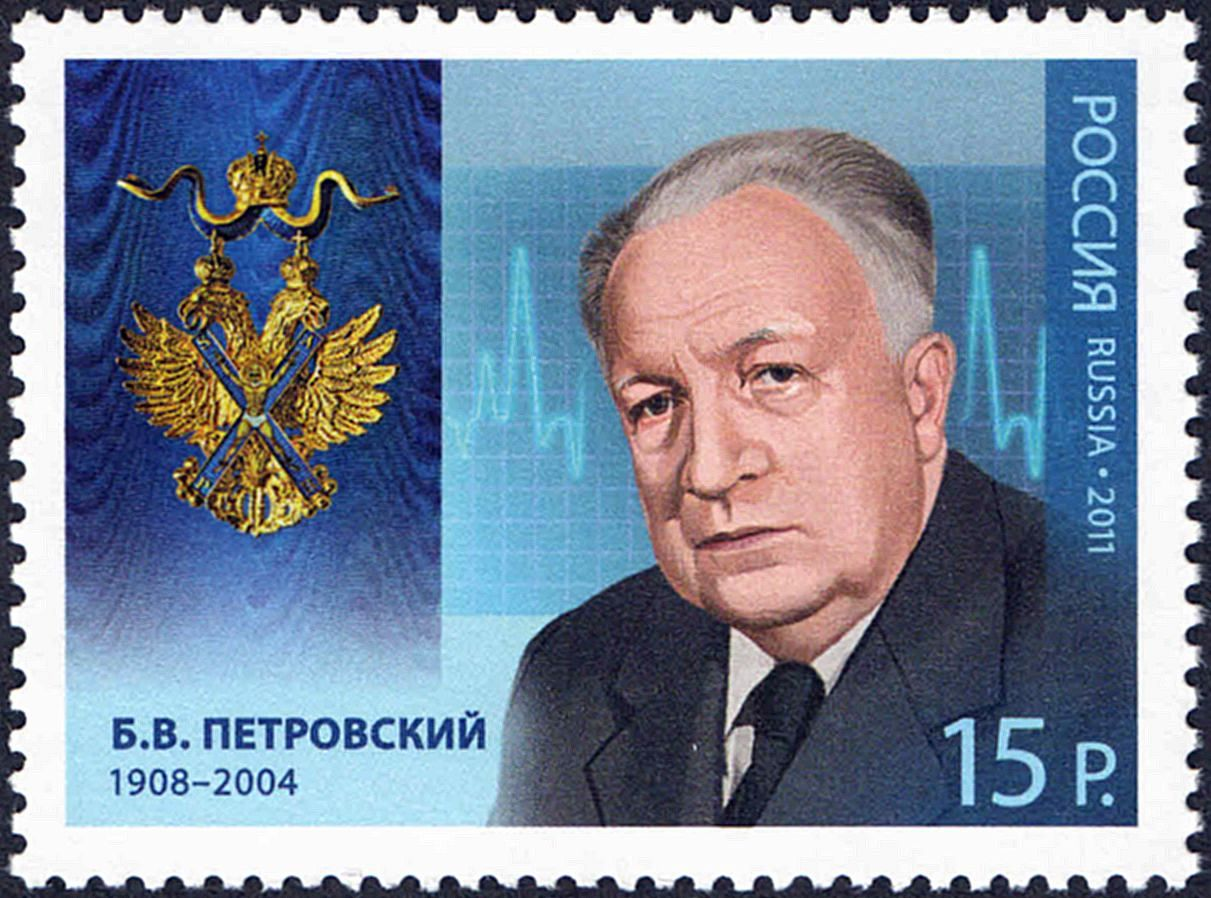
Boris Petrovsky. 2011: 1510, M:1742.

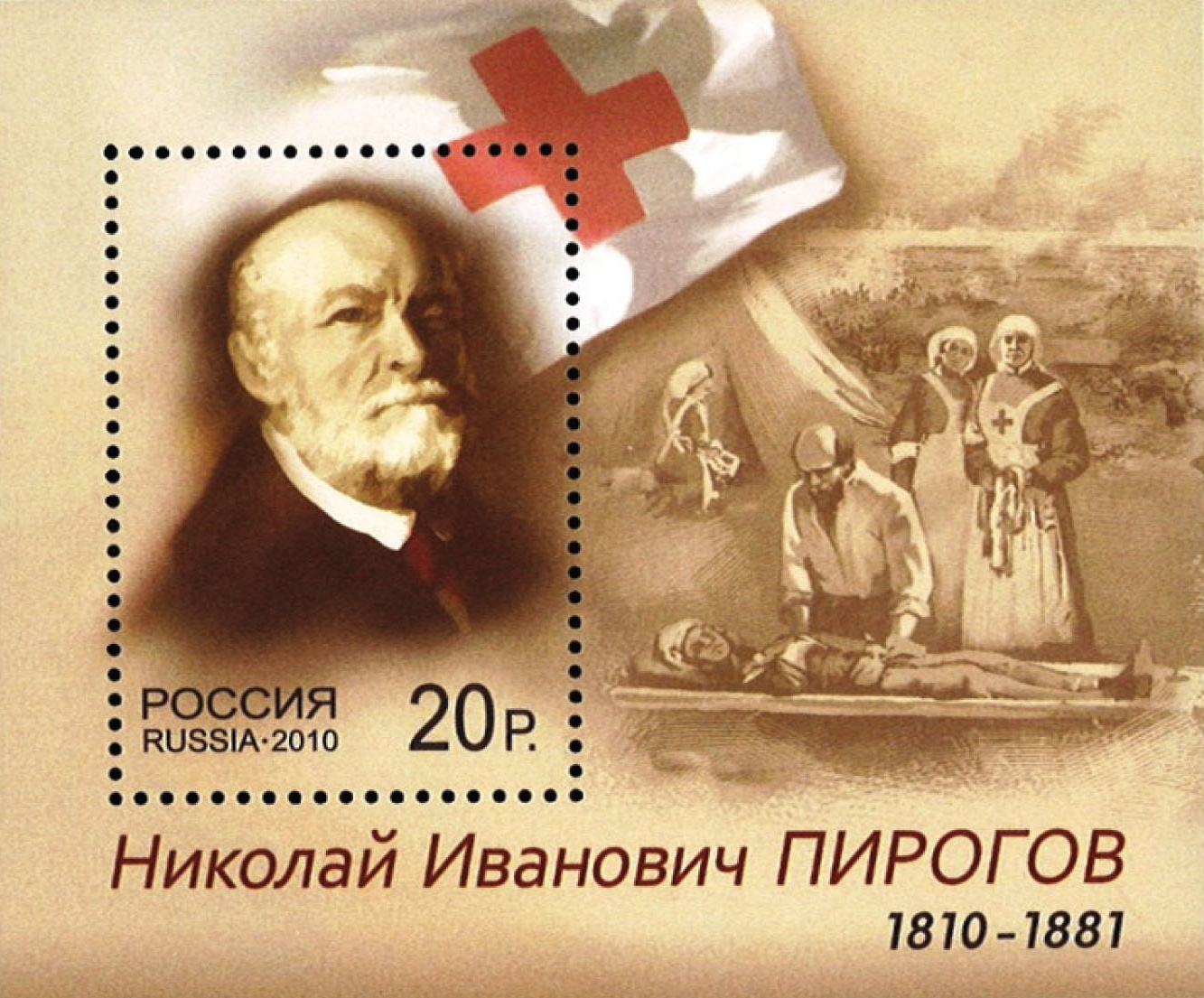
Nikolay Pirogov.2010: 1459, M:1691 (Block142).

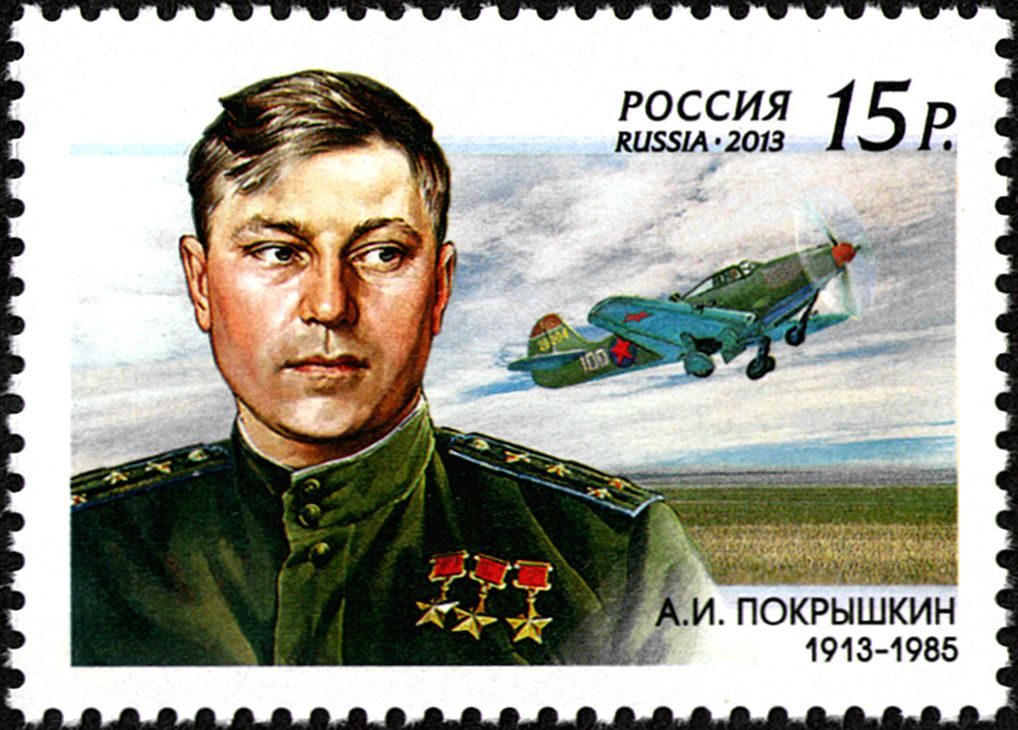
Alexander Pokryshkin. 2013: 1675, M:1907.

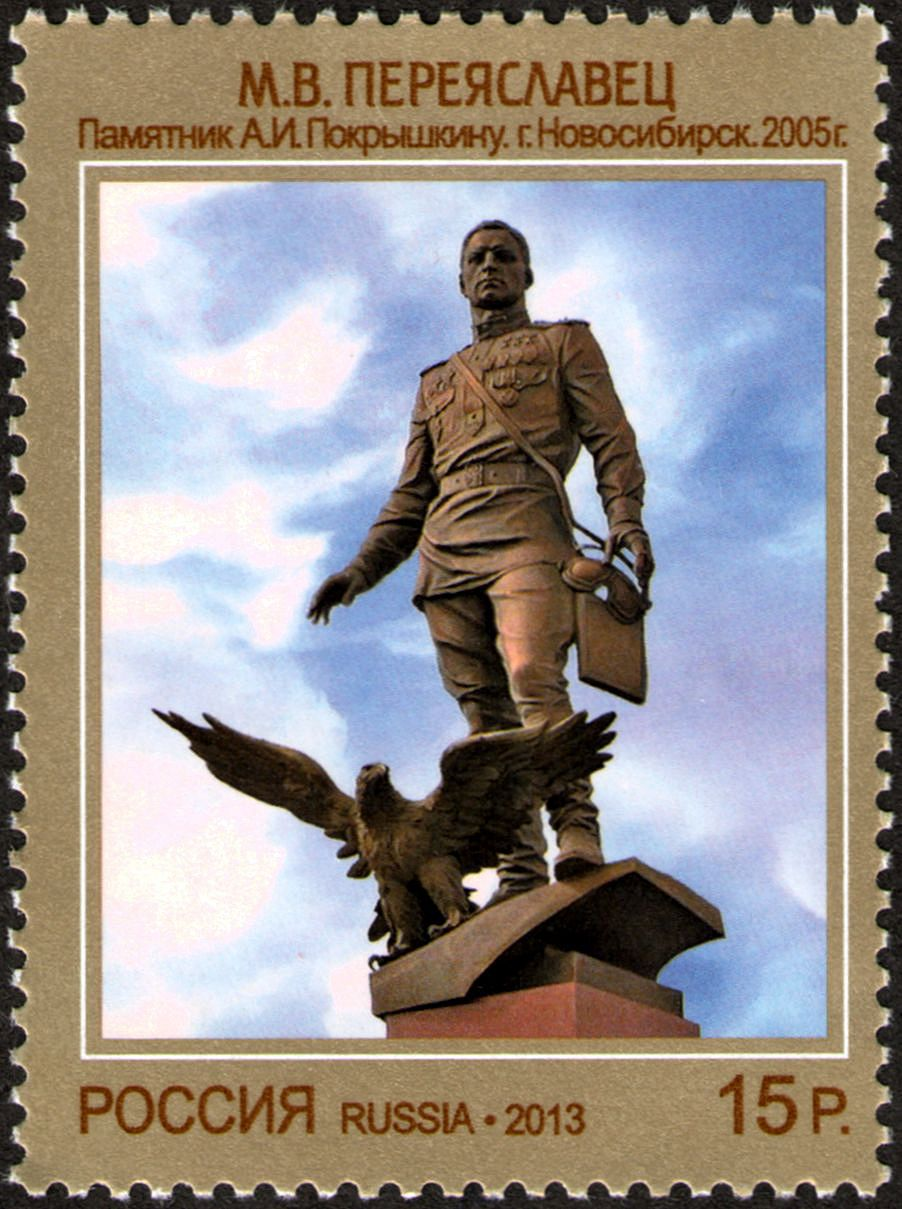
Alexander Pokryshkin. 2013: 1742, M:1974. The monument to A. Pokryshkin in Novosibirsk by M. Pereyaslavets. 2005.

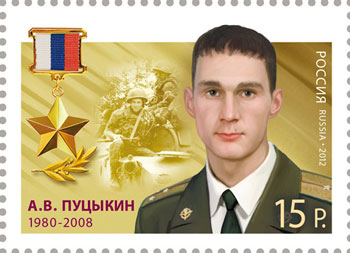
Aleksey Putsykin. 2012: 1587, M:1819.

== R ==
- Alexander Radishchev (1749 – 1802), a Russian author and social critic. 2013:
- Faina Ranevskaya (1896, Taganrog – 1984, Moscow), a Soviet Russian film and theater actress. 2001: 701, M:933, S:6656.
- Marina Raskova (1912, Moscow – 1942, near Mikhailovka village, Saratov District, Saratov Oblast), a Soviet female pilot and navigator, a Major of the Soviet Air Forces, a participant in record flights, the founder of female air regiments. Hero of the Soviet Union (1938). 2012: 1567, M:1799.
- Dmitry Razumovsky (Russian: Дмитрий Александрович Разумовский; 1968, Ulyanovsk – 2004, Beslan), a Podpolkovnik of the Federal Security Service, an officer of Vympel Group, was killed in action during the Beslan school hostage crisis. Hero of the Russian Federation (2004, posthumously). 2012: 1588, M:1820.
- Rurik (died in 879), a Varangian, a Prince of Novgorod (862–879), the founder of the Rurik Dynasty which ruled Russia until 1610. 2012: 1635, M:1867.
- Nikolai Rybnikov (Russian: Николай Николаевич Рыбников; 1930, Borisoglebsk – 1990, Moscow), a Soviet Russian film actor. 2001: 708, M:940, S:6663.
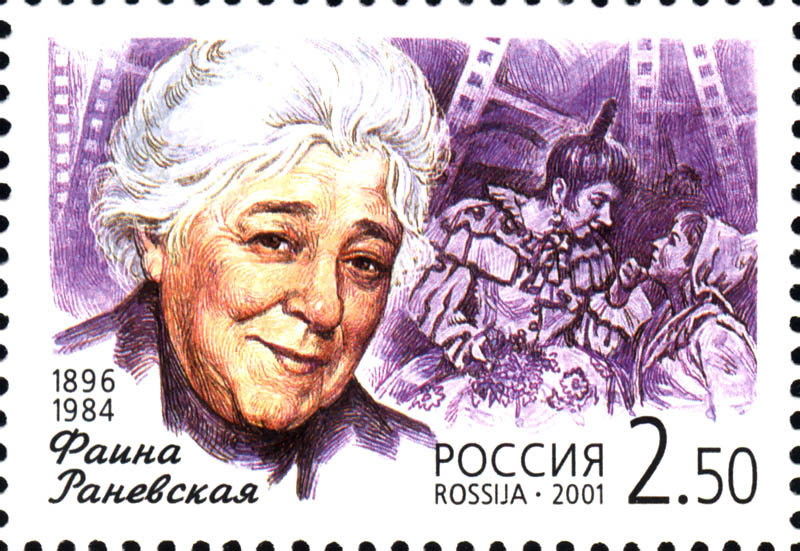
Faina Ranevskaya. 2001: 701, M:933, S:6656.

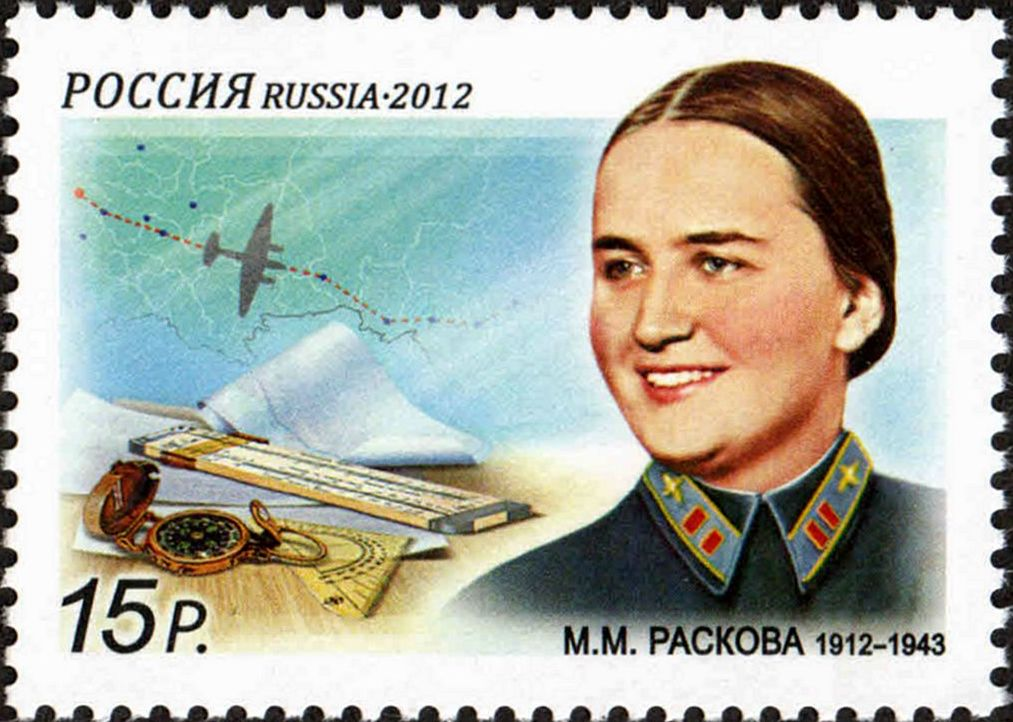
Marina Raskova. 2012: 1567, M:1799.

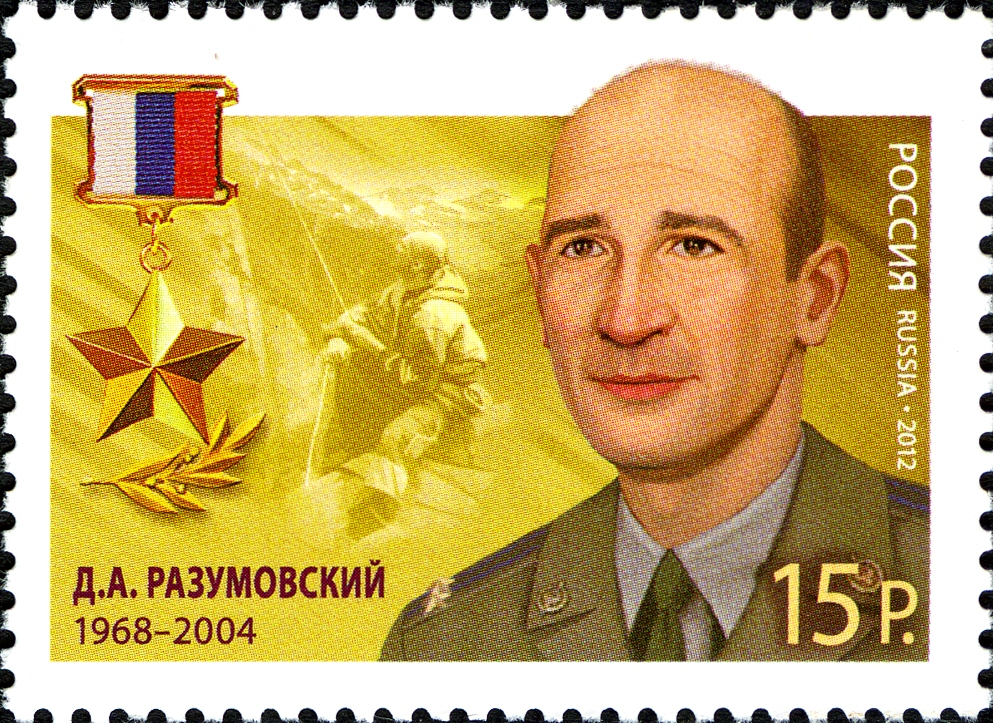
Dmitry Razumovsky. 2012: 1587, M:1820.

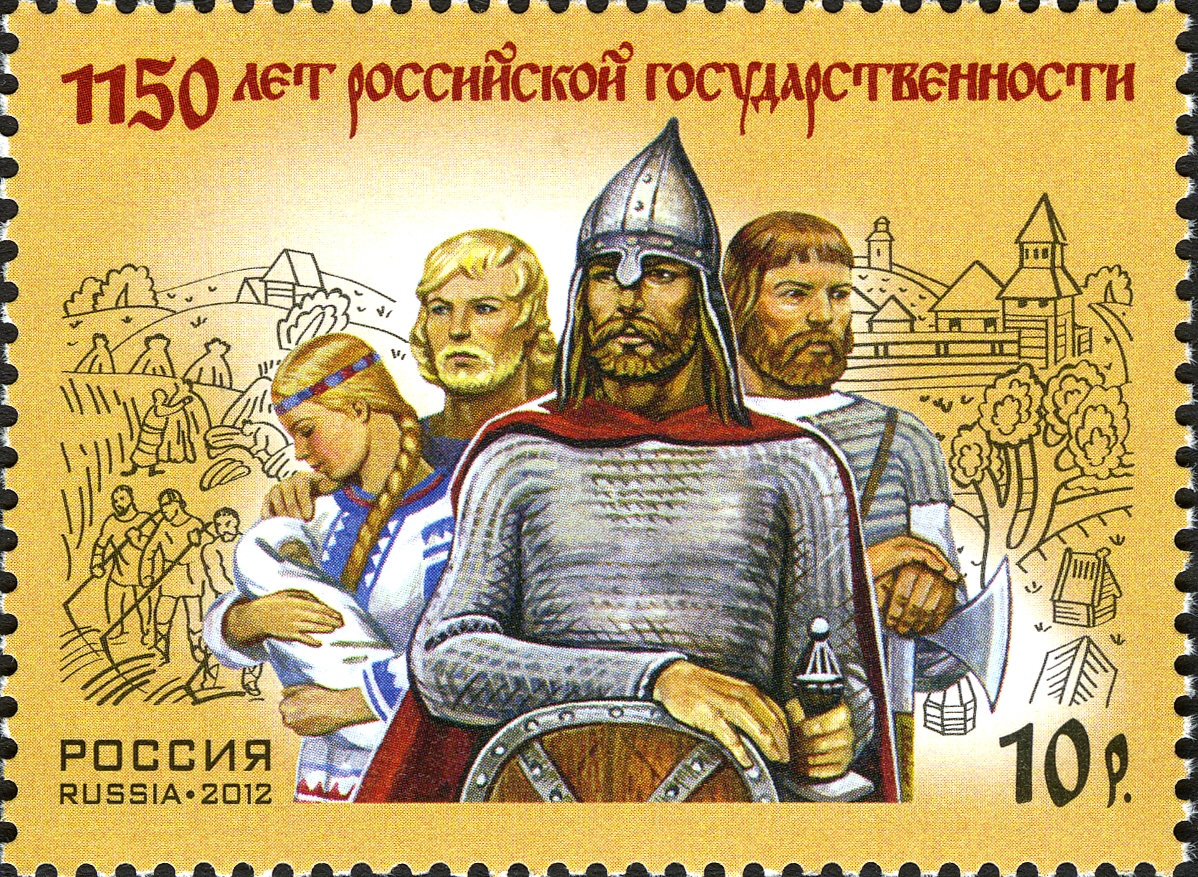
Rurik. The conjectural portrait of Rurik: the prince is depicted in the centre as a warrior in armour. 2012: 1635, M:1867.

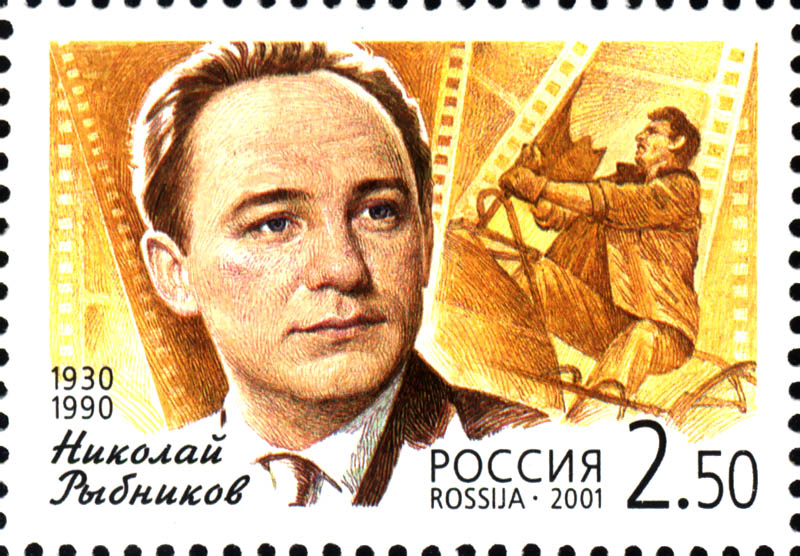
Nikolai Rybnikov. 2001: 708, M:940, S:6663.

== S ==
- Aidan Salakhova (born 1964 in Moscow), a Russian painter, a sculptor, a gallerist and a public person. 2011: 1516, M:1748
- Anatoly Serov (Russian: Анатолий Константинович Серов; Vorontsovka settlement, Perm Guberniya – 1939, Vysokoe village, Rybnovsky District, Ryazan Oblast), a Soviet military pilot, a Combrig of the Soviet Air Force, a participant in the Spanish Civil War. Hero of the Soviet Union (1938). 2010: 1387, M:1619.
- Kirill Shchelkin (1911, Tiflis, Russian Empire – 1968, Moscow), a Soviet scientist, a physicist (processes of combustion and detonation), one of key figures of the Soviet atomic bomb project, the first Scientific Director and the Designer-in-Chief of the Nuclear Center in Chelyabinsk-70. Hero of Socialist Labor (1949, 1951, 1954). 2011: 1485, M:1717.
- Nikolay Semyonov (Russian: Никола́й Никола́евич Семёнов; 1896, Saratov – 1986, Moscow), a Soviet physical chemist who won the Nobel prize in chemistry in 1956 for his work on chemical transformation. Hero of Socialist Labor (1966, 1976); Lomonosov Gold Medal (1969). 2021: 2724, M:2947, S:8227.
- Valery Shumakov (1931, Moscow – 2008, Moscow), a Soviet and Russian surgeon and transplantologist, the founding father of organ transplantation in the Soviet Union. Hero of Socialist Labor (1990). 2012: 1604, M:1836.
- Mikhail Skobelev (1843, Saint Petersburg – 1882, Moscow), a Russian military commander, a General of the Infantry of the Imperial Russian Army, a participant in the conquest of Central Asia by Russian Empire, one of leading Russian commanders of the Russo-Turkish War of 1877–1878. 2013: 1686, M:1918 (Block182).
- Pyotr Sobolevsky (Russian: Пётр Григорьевич Соболевский; 1782, Saint Petersburg – 1841, Saint Petersburg), a Russian engineer and scientist in the field of chemistry, metallurgy, mining. P. Sobolevsky made a valuable contribution to the development of iron industry and the metallurgy of precious metals in Russia. 2011: 1541, M:1773.
- Mikhail Speransky (1772, Cherkutino village, Vladimir Guberniya – 1839, Saint Petersburg), a Russian statesman, a reformer of the reign of Alexander I and Nicholas I, the founding father of the Russian science of law; a tutor of Crown Prince Alexander. 2012: 1632, M:1864.
- Constantin Stanislavski (1863, Moscow – 1938, Moscow), a Russian and Soviet actor and theatre director, a theorist of the theatrics, the creator of the classical system of acting (Stanislavski's system). 2000: 623, M:855, S:6606g; 2013: 1659, M:1891 (Block179).
- Vladimir Steklov (1864, Nizhny Novgorod – 1926, Gaspra), a Russian mathematician, mechanician and physicist. 2014:
- Pyotr Stolypin (1862, Dresden, Kingdom of Saxony – 1911, Kiev, Russian Empire), a Russian statesman, the Governor of Saratov Guberniya (1903–1906), the Minister of Interior of Russian Empire (1906–1911), the Chairman of the Council of Ministers of Russian Empire (1906–1911). 2012: 1568, M:1800.
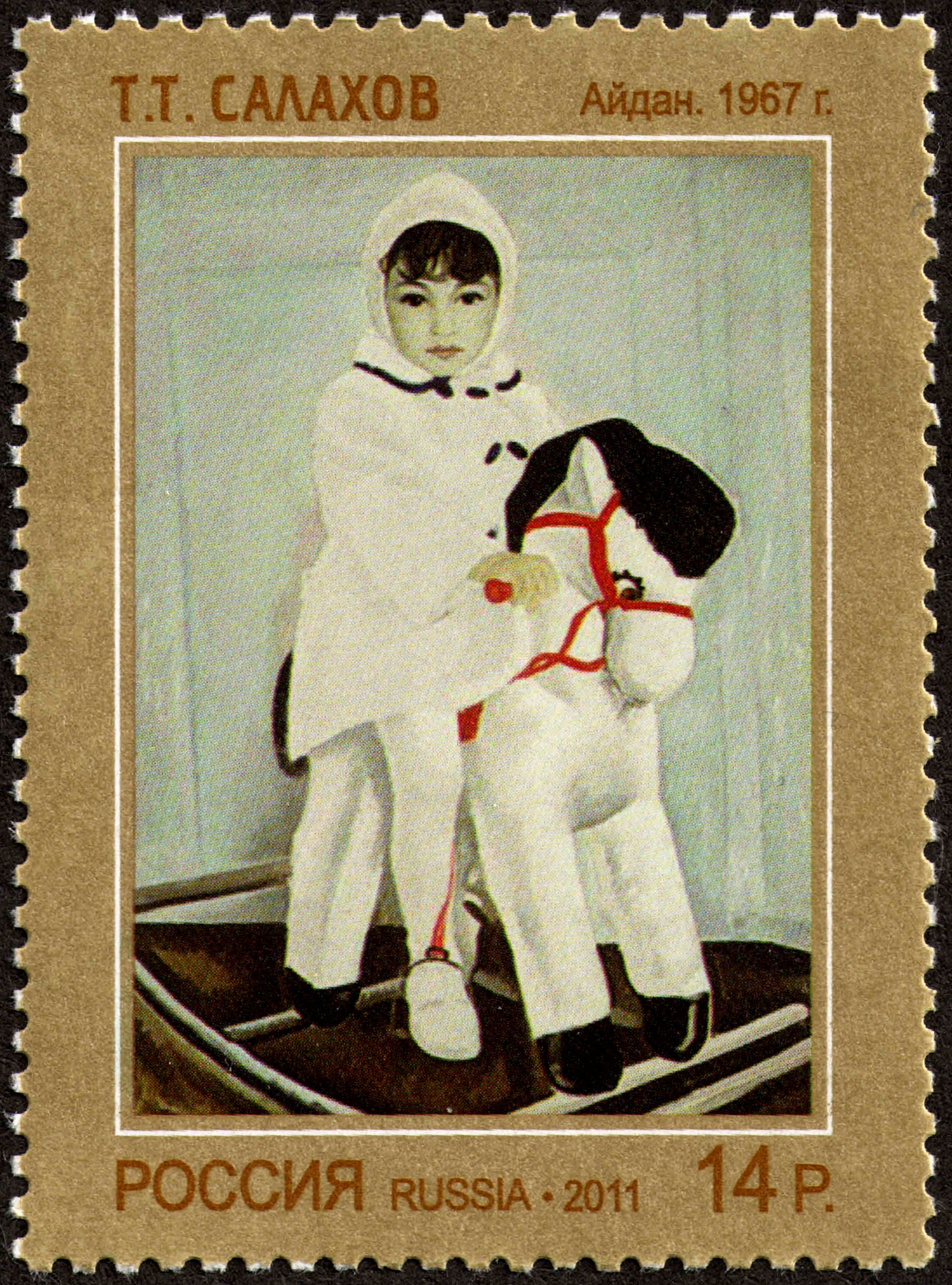
Aidan Salakhova. 2011: 1516, M: 1748. Aidan by T. Salakhov. 1967. The portrait of A. Salakhova in her childhood.

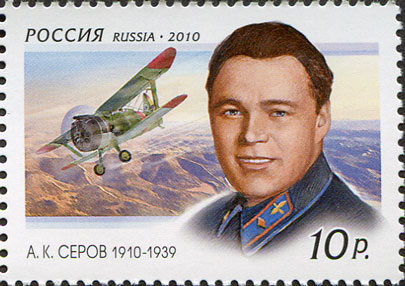
Anatoly Serov. 2010: 1387, M:1619.

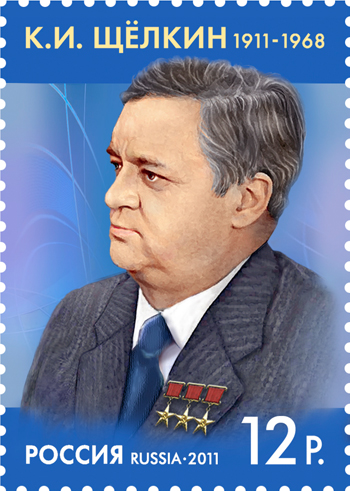
Kirill Shchelkin. 2011: 1485, M:1717.

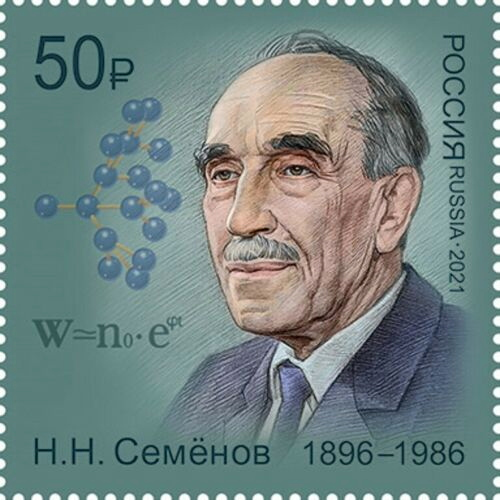
Nikolay Semyonov. 2021: 2724, M:2947, S:8227

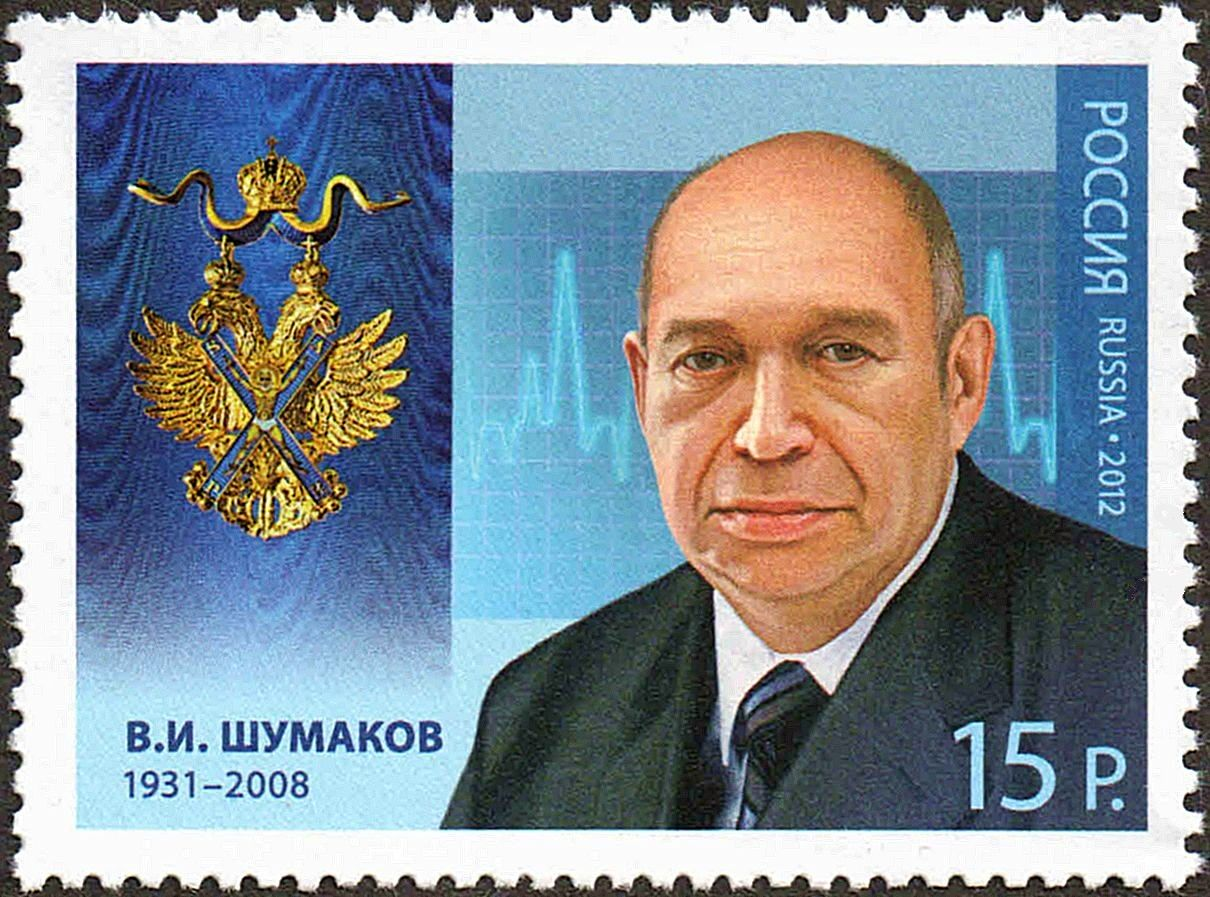
Valery Shumakov. 2012: 1604, M:1836.

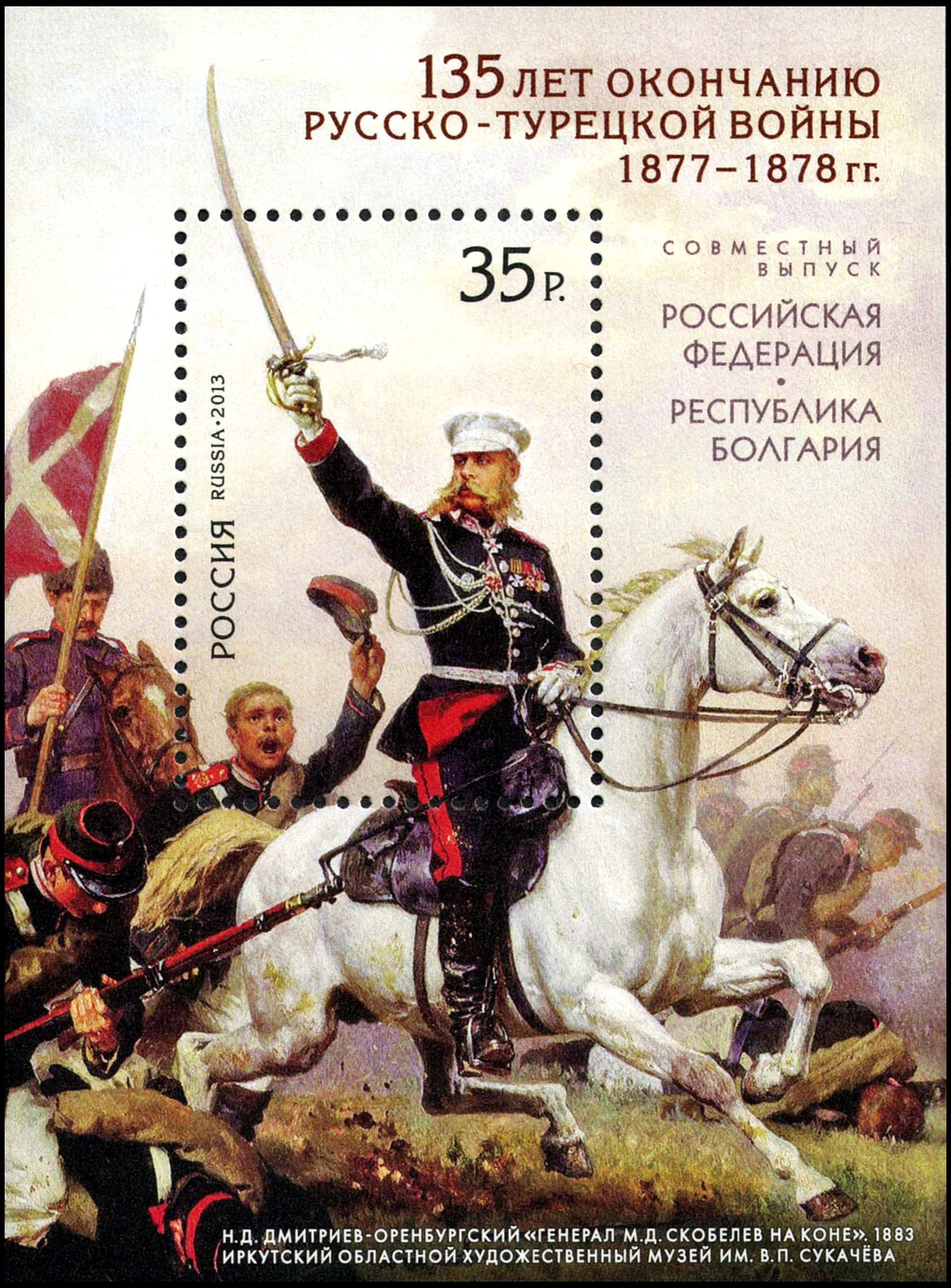
Mikhail Skobelev. 2013: 1686, M:1918 (Block182). General Mikhail Skobelev on the Horse by N. Dmitriev-Orenburgsky (fragment). 1883.

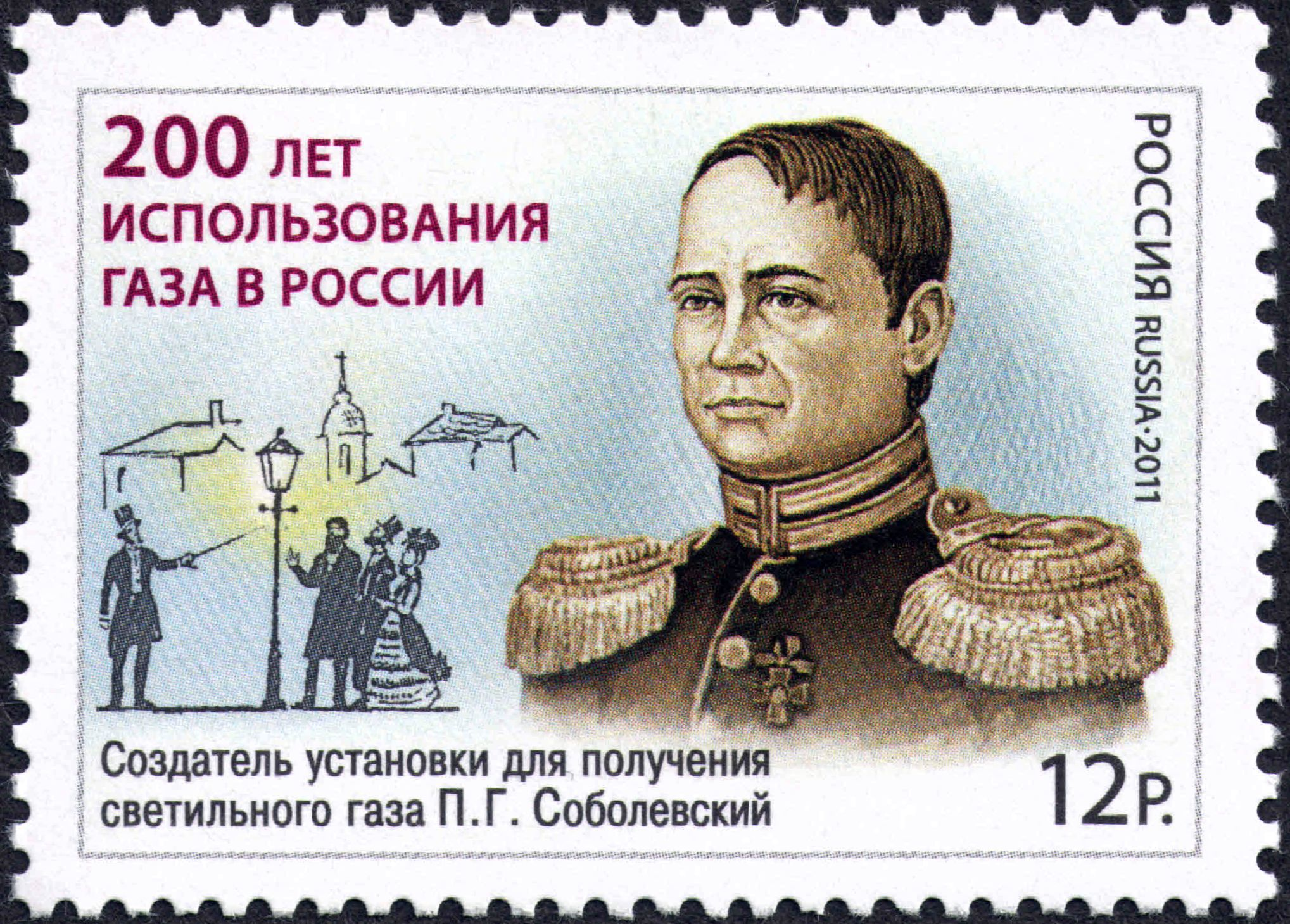
Pyotr Sobolevsky. 2011: 1541, M:1773.

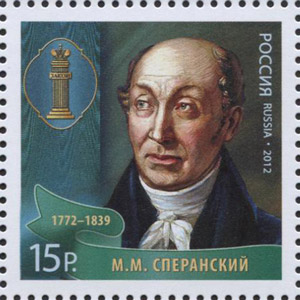
Mikhail Speransky. 2012: 1632, M:1864.

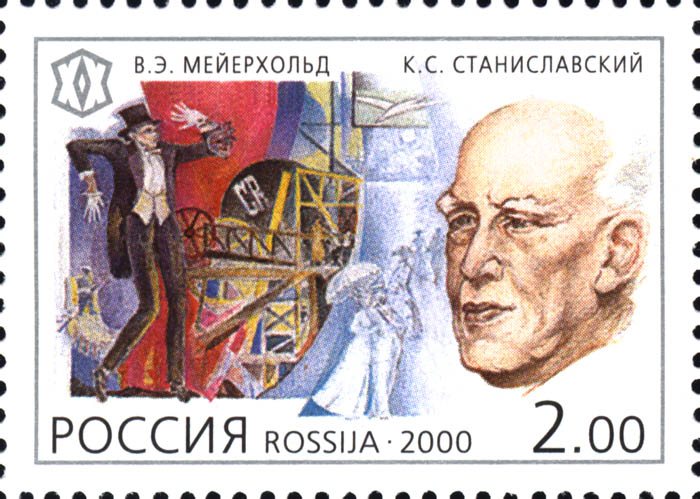
Constantin Stanislavski. 2000: 623, M:855, S:6606g. C. Stanislavski is portrayed on the right.

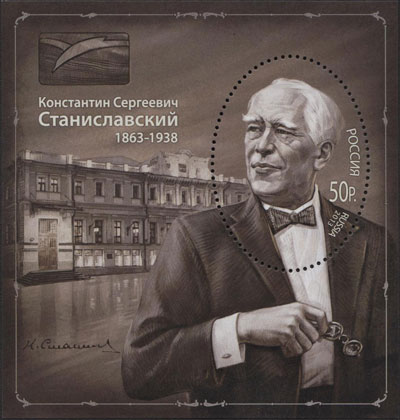
Constantin Stanislavski. 2013: 1659, M:1891 (Block179).

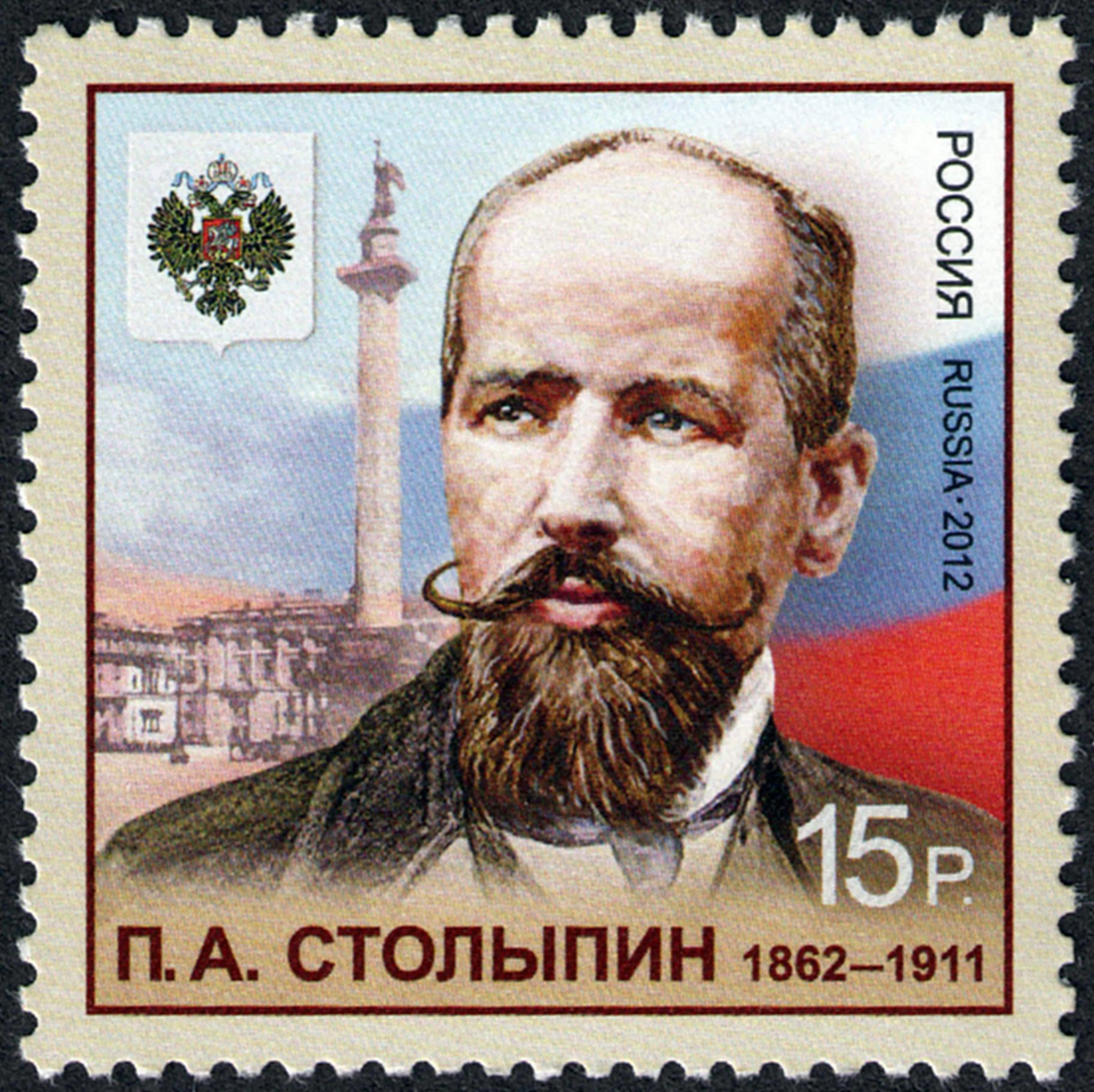
Pyotr Stolypin. 2012: 1568, M:1800.

== T ==
- Gherman Titov (1935, Verkhnee Zhilino village, Kosikhinsky District, Altai Krai – 2000, Moscow), a Soviet pilot and a cosmonaut, the second human to orbit the Earth and the fourth man in space. Hero of the Soviet Union (1961). 2001: 700, M:932, S:6655. 2010: 1442, M:1674.
- Konstantin Tsiolkovsky (1857, Izhevskoe village, Ryazan Guberniya – 1935, Kaluga), an Imperial Russian and Soviet rocket scientist and a pioneer of the astronautic theory, one of the founding fathers of rocketry and astronautics. 2007: 1175, M:1407.
- Aldar Tsydenzhapov (Russian: Алдар Баторович Цыденжапов, 1991, Aginskoe – 2010, Vladivostok), a Seaman of the Pacific Fleet of the Russian Navy. During a fire on the board of the destroyer Bystry (Sovremenny class) he, at the cost of his life, prevented the spread of flame and staved off a possible catastrophe. Hero of the Russian Federation (2010, posthumously). 2012: 1588, M:1821.
- Hovhannes Tumanyan (1869, Dsegh, Erivan Guberniya, Russian Empire – 1923, Moscow), an Armenian poet and prose writer, a public activist. He is considered by many to be the national poet of Armenia. 2011: 1491, M:1723.
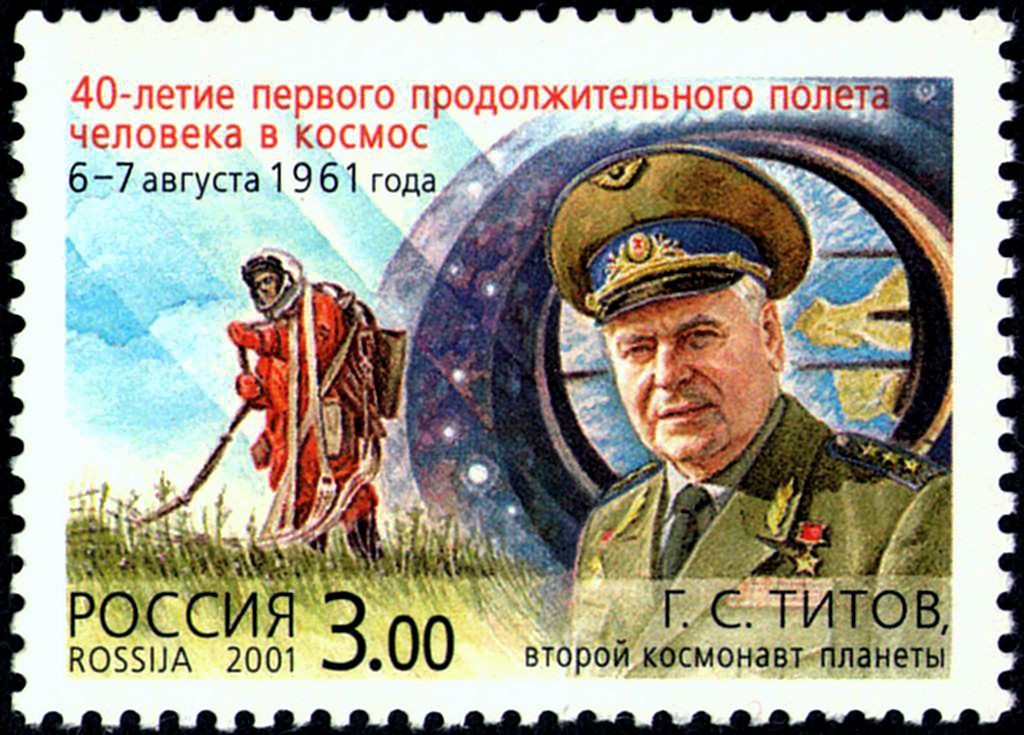
Gherman Titov. 2001: 700, M:932, S:6655.

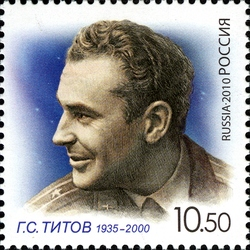
Gherman Titov. 2010: 1442, M:1674.

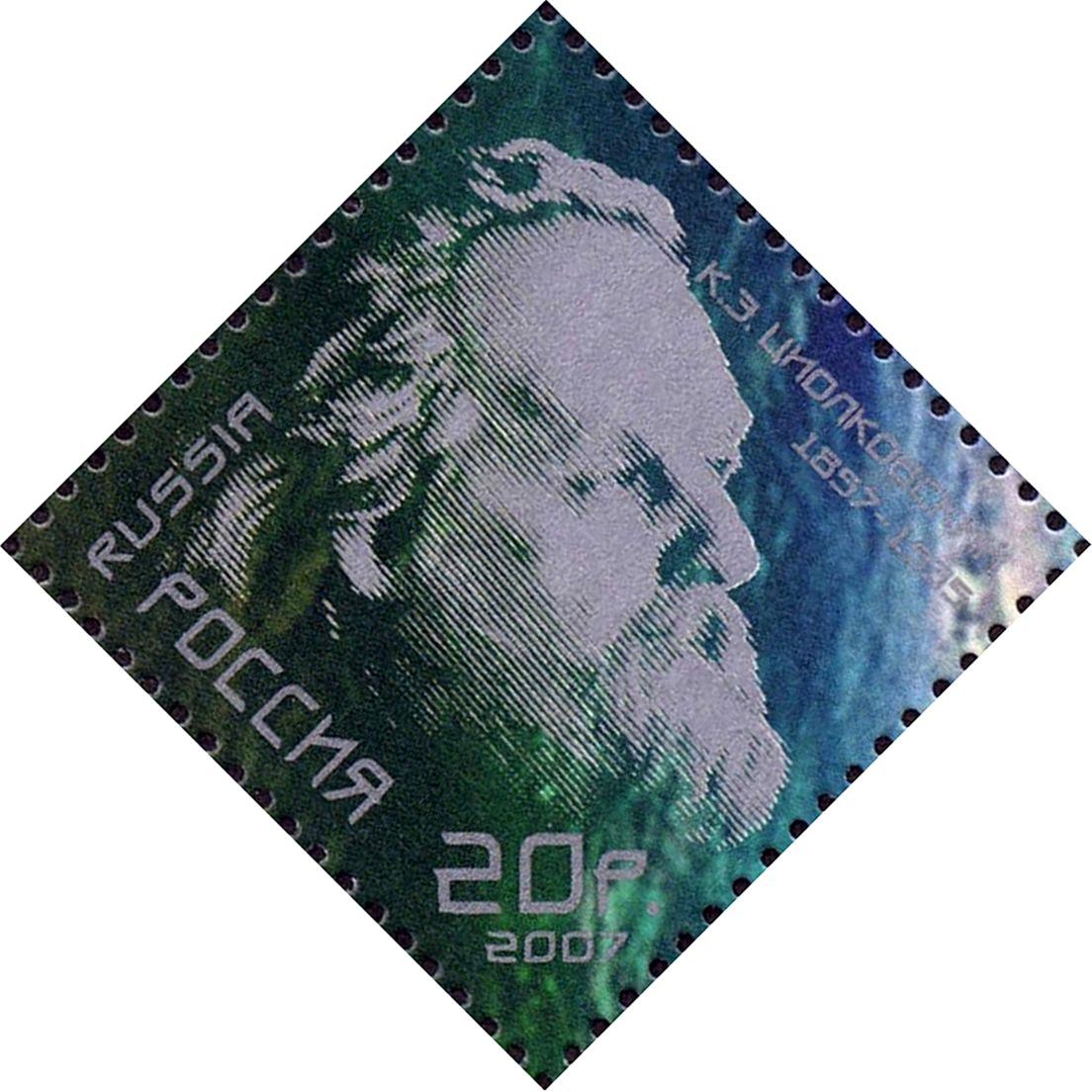
Konstantin Tsiolkovsky . 2007: 1175, M:1407. The stamp was issued as a part of the miniature sheet 50th Anniversary of the Space Age.

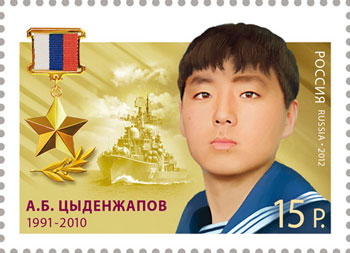
Aldar Tsydenzhapov. 2012: 1588, M:1821.

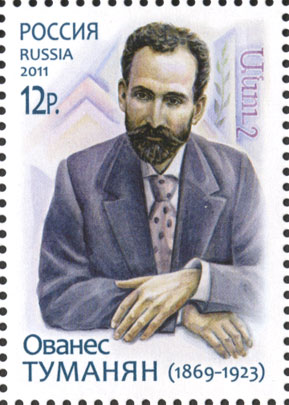
Hovhannes Tumanyan. 2011: 1491, M:1723.

== V ==
- Boris Vilkitsky (1913, Pulkovo (Saint Petersburg) – 1961, Brussels, Belgium), a Russian naval officer, a Captain of the First Rank of the Imperial Russian Navy, a hydrographer and surveyor, a polar explorer, the discoverer of Severnaya Zemlya. 2013: 1733, M:1964 (Block179).
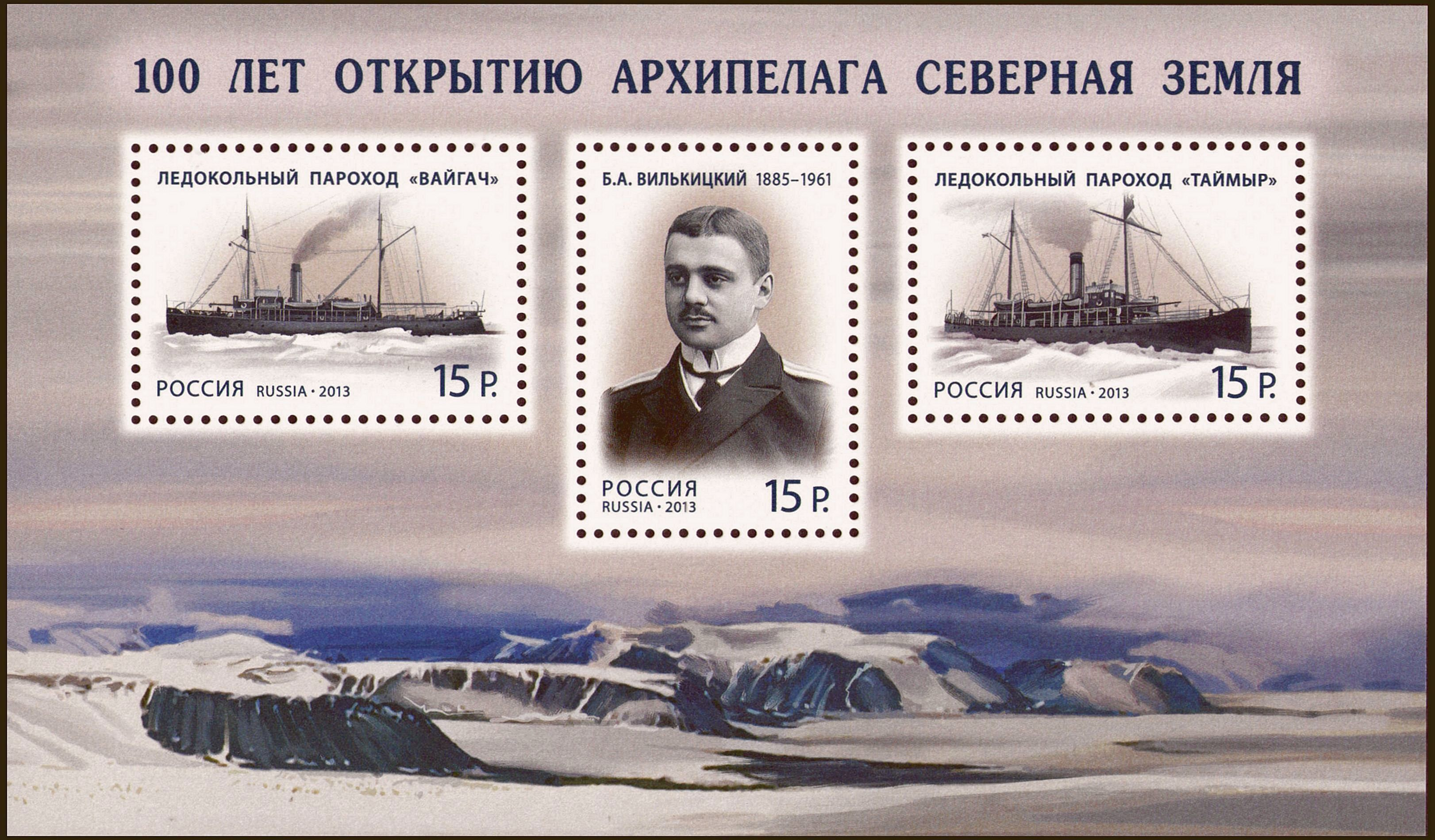
Boris Vilkitsky . 2013: 1733, M:1964 (the central stamp of the miniature sheet No 1732–1734/M:Block179).

== Y ==
- Irina Yanina (1966, Taldy-Kurgan, USSR – 1999, near Karamakhi), a Sergeant of the Internal Troops of Russia, a military nurse. Irina Yanina was killed in action during the Second Chechen War, near Karamakhi village, Dagestan, when she was evacuating wounded soldiers from the zone of enemy fire. Hero of the Russian Federation (1999, posthumously). 2012: 1589, M:1822.
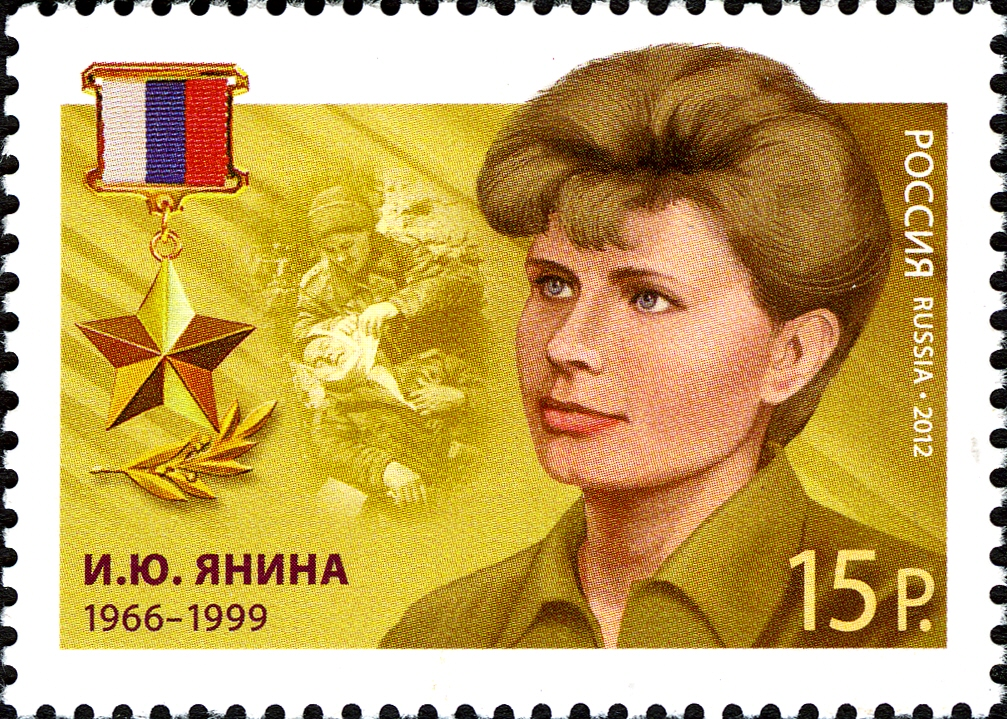
Irina Yanina. 2012: 1589, M:1822.

== Z ==
- Lavrenty Zagoskin (1808, Nikolaevka village, Penza Guberniya – 1890, Ryazan), a Russian naval officer and an explorer of Alaska. 1992: 29, M:248, S:6087.
- Valery Zamaraev (Russian: Валерий Валентинович Замараев; 1959, Sverdlovsk – 2004, Beslan), a Russian rescuer, an officer of the Central Air-Mobile Rescue Team of EMERCOM; was lethally wounded and died during the Beslan school hostage crisis. Hero of the Russian Federation (2004, posthumously). 2012: 1586, M:1818.
- Friedrich Zander (1887, Riga, Russian Empire – 1933, Kislovodsk), a Soviet scientist and inventor, one of pioneers of rocketry and spaceflight, one of leaders of the Group for the Study of Reactive Motion. 2012: 1620, M:1852.
- Mikhail Zharov (1899, Moscow – 1981, Moscow), a Soviet Russian film and theater actor, cinema and stage director. Hero of Socialist Labor (1974). 2001: 702, M:934, S:6657.
- Vasily Zhukovsky (1783, Mishenskoe village, Tula, Russia Gubernia – 1852, Baden-Baden, Germany), a Russian poet, a leading figure in Russian literature in the first half of the 19th century. 2005: 1011, M:1243, S:6894.
- Nikolai Zubov (Russian: Николай Николаевич Зубов; 1885, Lipkany market town, Khotyn Uyezd, Guberniya of Bessarabia, Russian Empire) – 1960, Moscow), a Russian and Soviet naval officer, a Captain of the Second Rank of the Imperial Russian Navy, a Counter Admiral of the Soviet Navy, a polar explorer, a participant in numerous Russian and Soviet polar expeditions, an oceanologist. 2010: 1434, M:1666.
- Lyudmila Zykina (1929, Moscow – 2009, Moscow), a Soviet and Russian singer, a performer of Russian folk songs and romances. Hero of Socialist Labour (1987). 2011: 1508, M:1740.
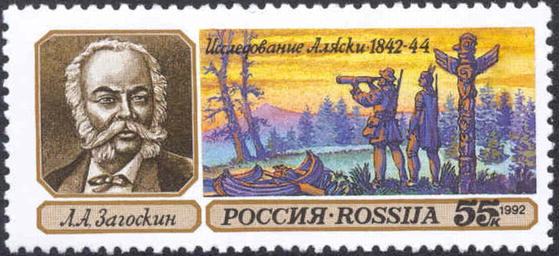
Lavrenty Zagoskin. 1992: 29, M:248, S:6087.

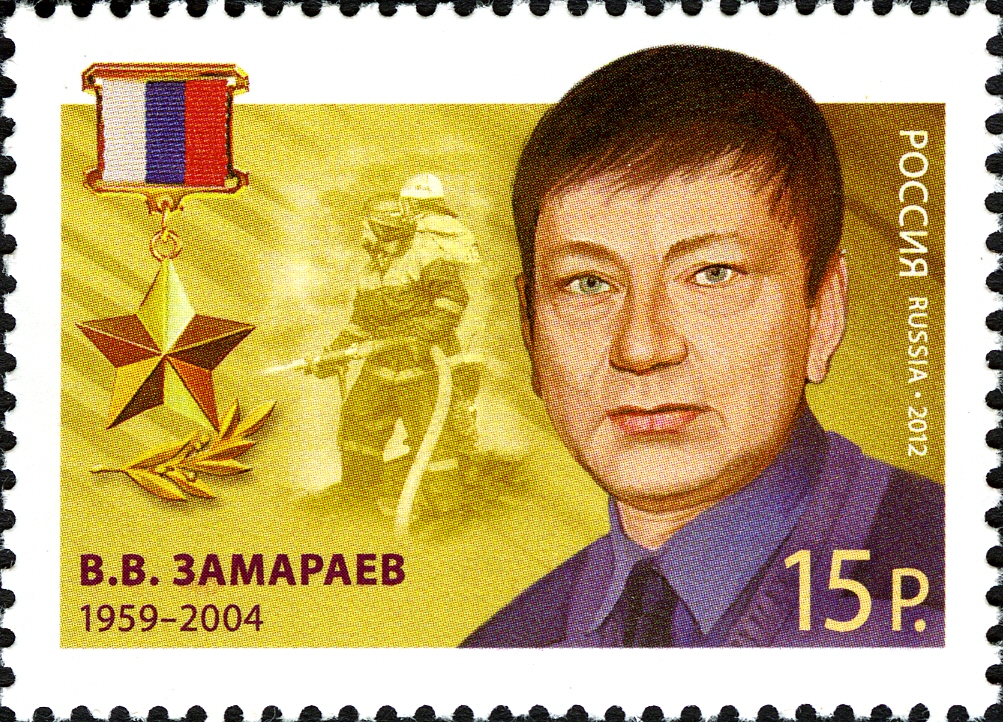
Valery Zamaraev. 2012: 1586, M:1818.

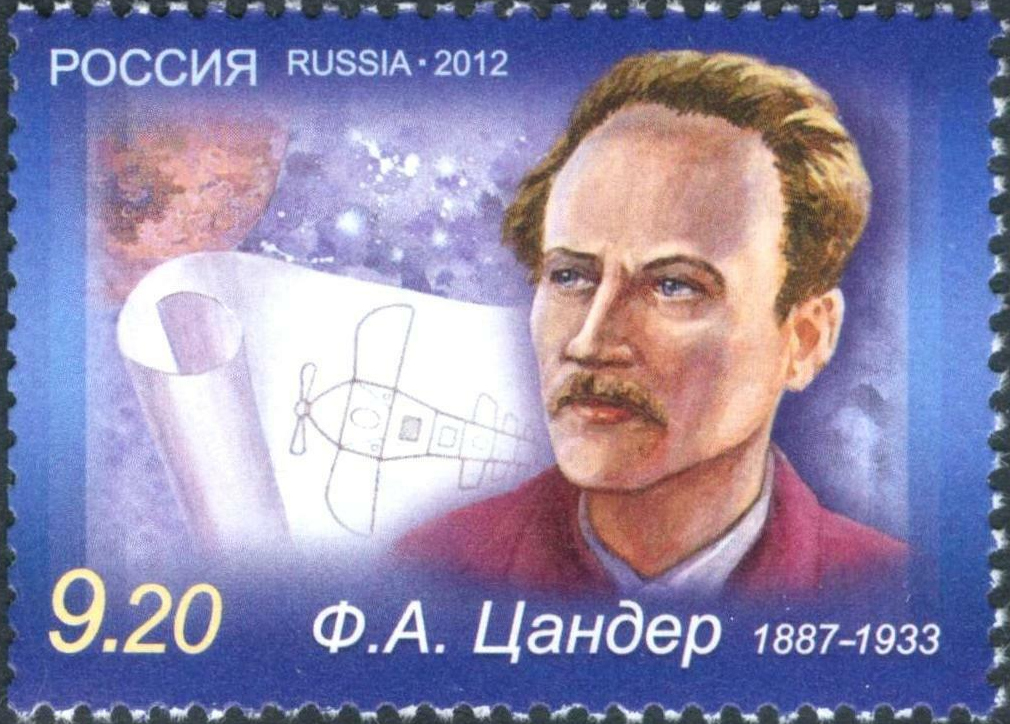
Friedrich Zander. 2012: 1620, M:1852.

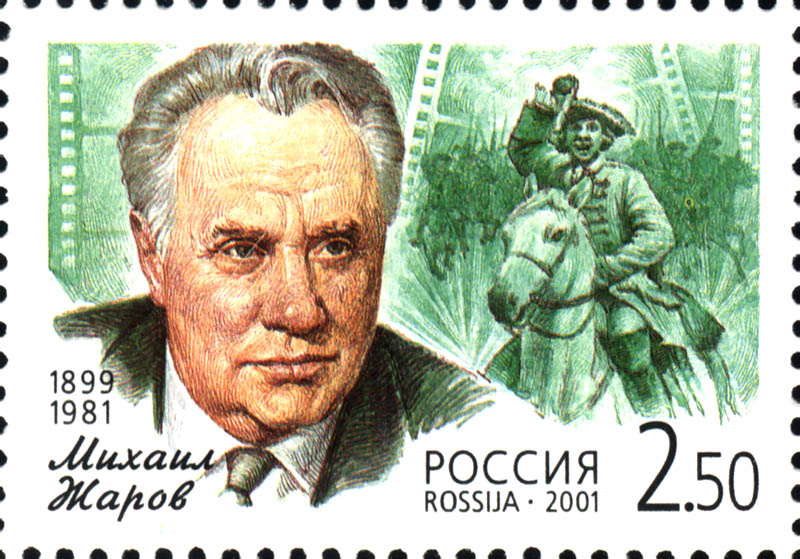
Mikhail Zharov. 2001: 702, M:934, S:6657.

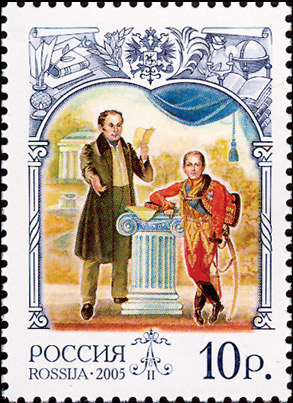
Vasily Zhukovsky. 2005: 1011, M:1243, S:6894. Vasily Zhukovsky (on the left) with his pupil Crown Prince Alexander.

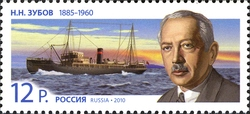
Nikolai Zubov. 2010: 1434, M:1666.

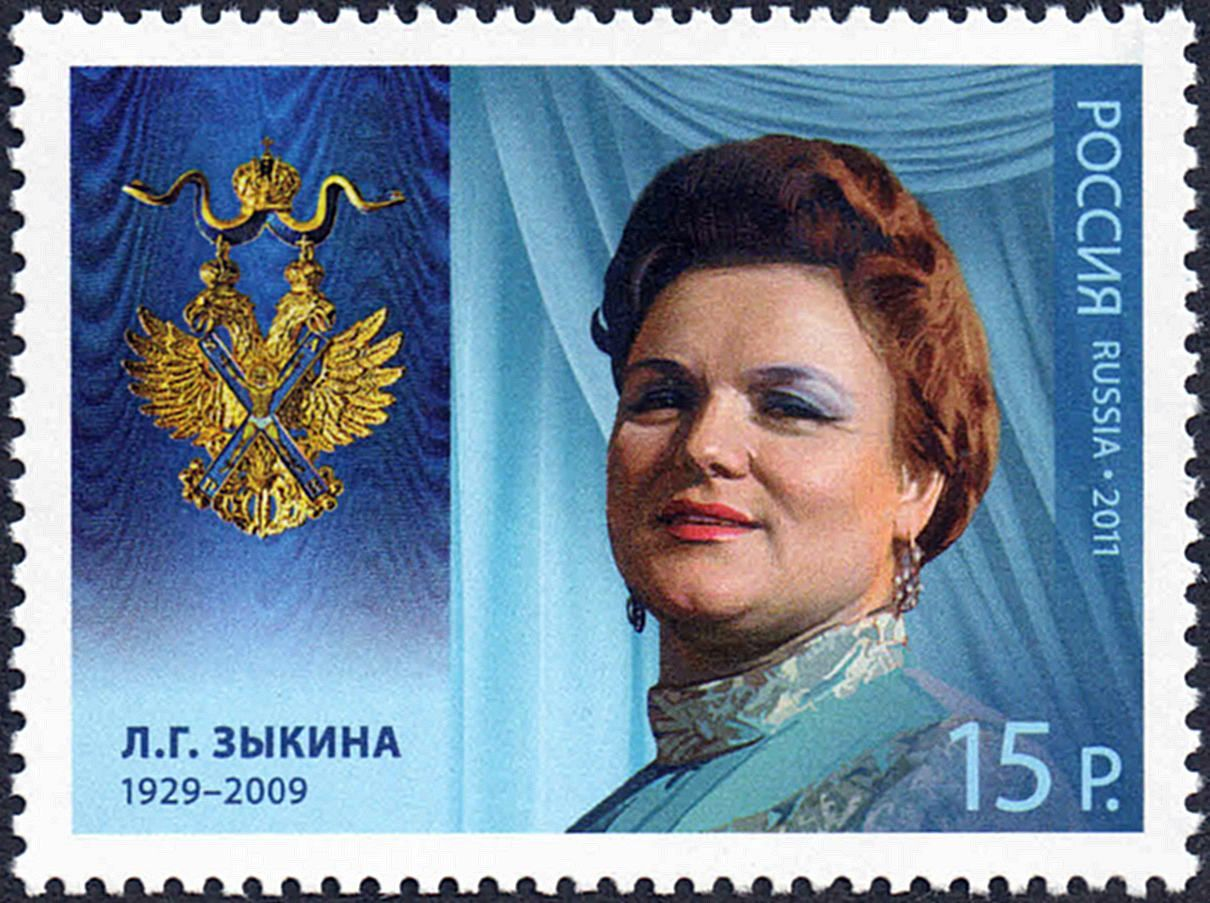
Lyudmila Zykina. 2011: 1508, M:1740.

== Index of persons by occupation ==
- Actors. Irina Arkhipova • Gleb Kotelnikov • Nikolai Kryuchkov • Yevgeny Leonov • Vsevolod Meyerhold • Andrei Mironov • Yuri Nikulin • Lyubov Orlova • Anatoli Papanov • Faina Ranevskaya • Nikolai Rybnikov • Constantin Stanislavski • Mikhail Zharov
- Astronauts. Gherman Titov
- Aviators. Grigory Bakhchivandzhi • Valentina Grizodubova • Pyotr Nesterov • Marina Raskova • Alexander Pokryshkin • Anatoly Serov • Gherman Titov
- Constructors. Ivan Bubnov (submarines) • Mikhail Koshkin (tanks) • Gleb Kotelnikov (parachutes) • Pyotr Nesterov (aviation) • Pyotr Sobolevsky (system of gas lighting) • Friedrich Zander (rocket engines)
- Diplomats. Viktor Chernomyrdin • Grigory Langsdorff • Afanasy Ordin-Nashchokin
- Directors (cinema and theatre). Vsevolod Meyerhold • Constantin Stanislavski • Mikhail Zharov
- Explorers. Christopher Columbus (American continents) • Yevgeny Fyodorov (Arctic) • Grigory Langsdorff (Brasília) • Nicholas Miklouho-Maclay (Oceania, Southeast Asia) • Boris Vilkitsky (Arctic) • Lavrenty Zagoskin (Alaska) • Nikolai Zubov (Arctic)
- Jurists. Gavrila Derzhavin • Anatoli Koni • Oleg Kutafin • Mikhail Speransky
- Members of armed forces (see also Navy Personnel). Grigory Bakhchivandzhi • Dmitry Mikhailovich Galitzine • Valentina Grizodubova • Ernesto Che Guevara • Pyotr Nesterov • Vasily Orlov-Denisov • Alexander Pokryshkin • Aleksey Putsykin • Marina Raskova • Dmitry Razumovsky • Anatoly Serov • Mikhail Skobelev • Gherman Titov • Irina Yanina
- Members of noble families. Glafira Ivanovna Alymova • Dmitry Mikhailovich Galitzine • Georg Heinrich von Langsdorff • Ekaterina Alelseevna Musina-Pushkina • Vasily Orlov-Denisov
- Monarchs and members of royal families. Alexander II of Russia • Maria Alexandrovna • Rurik
- Musicians. Glafira Alymova (harpist) • Irina Arkhipova (opera singer) • Feodor Chaliapin (opera singer) • Andrei Mironov (singer) • Lyubov Orlova (pianist, singer) • Lyudmila Zykina (singer)
- Navy personnel. Ivan Bubnov • Vladimir Istomin • Aldar Tsydenzhapov • Boris Vilkitsky • Lavrenty Zagoskin • Nikolai Zubov
- Religious leaders. Alexy II of Moscow
- Painters. Abram Arkhipov • Vladimir Borovikovsky • Pavel Chistyakov • Nikolai Ge • Orest Kiprensky • Konstantin Korovin • Ivan Kramskoi • Dmitry Levitzky • Mikhail Nesterov • Vasily Perov • Aidan Salakhova
- Physicians. Ernesto Che Guevara • Grigory Langsdorff • Boris Petrovsky • Nikolay Pirogov • Valery Shumakov
- Poets. Valery Bryusov • Gavrila Derzhavin • Rasul Gamzatov • Sergey Mikhalkov • Hovhannes Tumanyan • Vasily Zhukovsky
- Prosaists. Valery Bryusov • Vladimir Dal • Ivan Goncharov • Maxim Gorky • Anatoli Koni • Konstantin Korovin • Sergey Mikhalkov • Hovhannes Tumanyan
- Rescuers. Valery Zamaraev
- Scientists. Ivan Bubnov (applied mathematics) • Vladimir Dal (lexicography) • Sergei Eisenstein (cinema theory) • Georgy Flyorov (nuclear physics) • Ilya Frank (physics) • Yevgeny Fyodorov (geophysics) • Mstislav Keldysh (mathematics, mechanics) • Adolph Theodor Kupffer (physics, chemistry, metrology) • Oleg Kutafin (jurisprudence) • Lev Landau (theoretical physics) • Dmitry Likhachov (philology, history) • Nicholas Miklouho-Maclay (anthropology, ethnology) • Nikolay Pirogov (medicine) • Kirill Shchelkin (physics) • Nikolay Semyonov (chemistry, physics) • Valery Shumakov (medicine) • Pyotr Sobolevsky (chemistry, metallurgy, mining) • Konstantin Tsiolkovsky(theory of cosmonautics) • Friedrich Zander (theory of cosmonautics) • Nikolai Zubov (oceanology)
- Statesmen, stateswomen. Heydar Aliyev (President of Azerbaijan, 1993—2003) • Ernesto Che Guevara (Minister of Industry of Cuba, 1961—1965) • Viktor Chernomyrdin (Prime Minister of the Russian Federation, 1992—1998) • Gavrila Derzhavin (Minister of Justice of the Russian Empire, 1802—1803 ) • Yevgeny Fyodorov (Head of Hydrometeorology Service of the USSR, 1939–1947, 1962–1974) • Anatoli Koni (a member of the State Council of the Russian Empire, 1907–1917) • Afanasy Ordin-Nashchokin (Governor of Posolsky Prikaz, 1667—1671) • Boris Petrovsky (Minister of Health of the USSR, 1965—1980) • Mikhail Speransky (Secretary of State of the Russian Empire, 1810–1812) • Pyotr Stolypin (Prime Minister of the Russian Empire, 1906–1911)
- Teachers. Irina Arkhipova (vocalism) • Pavel Chistyakov (visual arts) • Sergei Eisenstein (cinema theory) • Nikolay Pirogov (medicine) • Mikhail Speransky (court tutor) • Konstantin Tsiolkovsky (schoolteacher) • Vasily Zhukovsky (court tutor)

== Recipients of the highest state awards ==
- Recipients of the Order of Saint Andrew (Russian Empire). Alexander II of Russia • Mikhail Speransky
- Heroes of the Soviet Union. Grigory Bakhchivandzhi • Yevgeny Fyodorov • Valentina Grizodubova • Alexander Pokryshkin • Marina Raskova •Anatoly Serov •Gherman Titov
- Heroes of Socialist Labour. Heydar Aliyev • Irina Arkhipova • Georgy Flyorov • Rasul Gamzatov • Valentina Grizodubova • Mstislav Keldysh • Mikhail Koshkin • Nikolai Kryuchkov • Lev Landau • Dmitry Likhachov • Sergey Mikhalkov • Yuri Nikulin • Boris Petrovsky • Kirill Shchelkin • Nikolay Semyonov • Valery Shumakov • Mikhail Zharov • Lyudmila Zykina
- Recipients of the Order of Lenin. Sergei Eisenstein • Ilya Frank • Maxim Gorky • Yevgeny Leonov • Lyubov Orlova • Faina Ranevskaya • Constantin Stanislavski
- Heroes of the Russian Federation. Aleksey Putsykin • Dmitry Razumovsky • Aldar Tsydenzhapov • Irina Yanina • Valery Zamaraev
- Recipients of the Order of Saint Andrew (Russian Federation).Alexy II of Moscow • Heydar Aliyev • Irina Arkhipova • Rasul Gamzatov • Dmitry Likhachov • Sergey Mikhalkov • Boris Petrovsky • Valery Shumakov • Lyudmila Zykina

=== Nobel laureates ===
Nikolay Semyonov (in chemistry, 1956) • Ilya Frank (in physics, 1958) • Lev Landau (in physics, 1962)

== Index of names in Cyrillic ==
- А. Александр II• Алексий II • Алиев, Гейдар • Алымова Г.И. • Архипов А.Е. • Архипова И.К.
- Б. Бахчиванджи Г.Я. • Боровиковский В.Л. • Брюсов В.Я • Бубнов И.Г.
- В. Вилькицкий Б.А.
- Г. Гамзатов Р.Г. • Ге Н.Н. • Голицын Д.М. • Гончаров И.А. • Горький А.М. • Гризодубова В.С.
- Д. Даль В.И. • Державин Г.Р.
- Ж. Жаров М.И. • Жуковский В.А.
- З. Загоскин Л.А. • Замараев В.В. • Зубов Н.Н. • Зыкина Л.Г.
- И. Истомин В.И.
- К. Келдыш М.В. • Кипренский О.А. • Кони А.Ф. • Коровин К.А. • Котельников Г.Е. • Кошкин М.И. • Крамской И.Н. • Крючков Н.А. • Колумб, Христофор • Купфер А.Я. • Kутафин О.Е.
- Л. Лангсдорф Г.И. • Ландау Л.Д. • Левицкий Д.Г. • Леонов Е.П. • Лихачёв Д.С.
- М. Мария Александровна • Мейерхольд В.Э. • Миклухо-Маклай Н.Н. • Миронов А.А. • Михалков С.В. • Мусина-Пушкина Е.А.
- Н. Нестеров М.В. • Нестеров П.Н. • Никулин Ю.В.
- О. Ордин-Нащокин А.Л. • Орлов-Денисов В.В. • Орлова Л.П.
- П. Папанов А.Д. • Перов В.Г. • Петровский Б.В. • Пирогов Н.И. • Покрышкин А.И. • Пуцыкин А.В.
- Р. Раумовский Д.А. • Раневская Ф.Г. • Раскова М.М. • Рыбников Н.Н. • Рюрик
- С. Салахова А.Т. • Семёнов H.H. • Серов А.К. • Скобелев М.Д. • Соболевский П.Г. • Станиславский К.С. • Столыпин П.А.
- T. Титов Г.С. • Туманян О.Т.
- Ф. Фёдоров Е.К. • Флёров Г.Н. • Франк И.М.
- Ц. Цандер Ф.А. • Циолковский К.Э. • Цыденжапов А.Б.
- Ч. Че Гевара, Эрнесто • Черномырдин В.С. • Чистяков П.П.
- Ш. Шаляпин Ф.М. • Шумаков В.И.
- Щ. Щёлкин К.И.
- Э. Эйзенштейн С.М.
- Я. Янина И.Ю.

== See also ==
- Postage stamps and postal history of Russia
