= Shishlovsky Island =

Island in Rostov Oblast, Russia

Coordinates: 47°13′45.93″N 39°55′4.74″E

Shishlovskiy Island (Russian: остров Шишловский) is an uninhabited river island in the center of Aksaysky District, Rostov Oblast, Russia. The island is located on the river Don. Length - about 900 meters, width - up to 200 meters. The nearest town - Aksay.

This island is covered with woodland and is a popular place for recreation and water sports.

On the beach of the island make a stop ships on the route Rostov-on-Don - Starocherkasskaya.

== Links ==
- Карта-лоция участка Дона с островом Шишловский(in Russian)
