= Aksaysky =

Aksaysky (masculine), Aksayskaya (feminine), or Aksayskoye (neuter) may refer to:

- Aksaysky District, a district of Rostov Oblast, Russia
- Aksayskoye Urban Settlement, an administrative division and a municipal formation which the town of Aksay in Askaysky District of Rostov Oblast, Russia is incorporated as
