= The Rostov Waterpipe Museum =

Museum in Rostov-on-Don, Russia

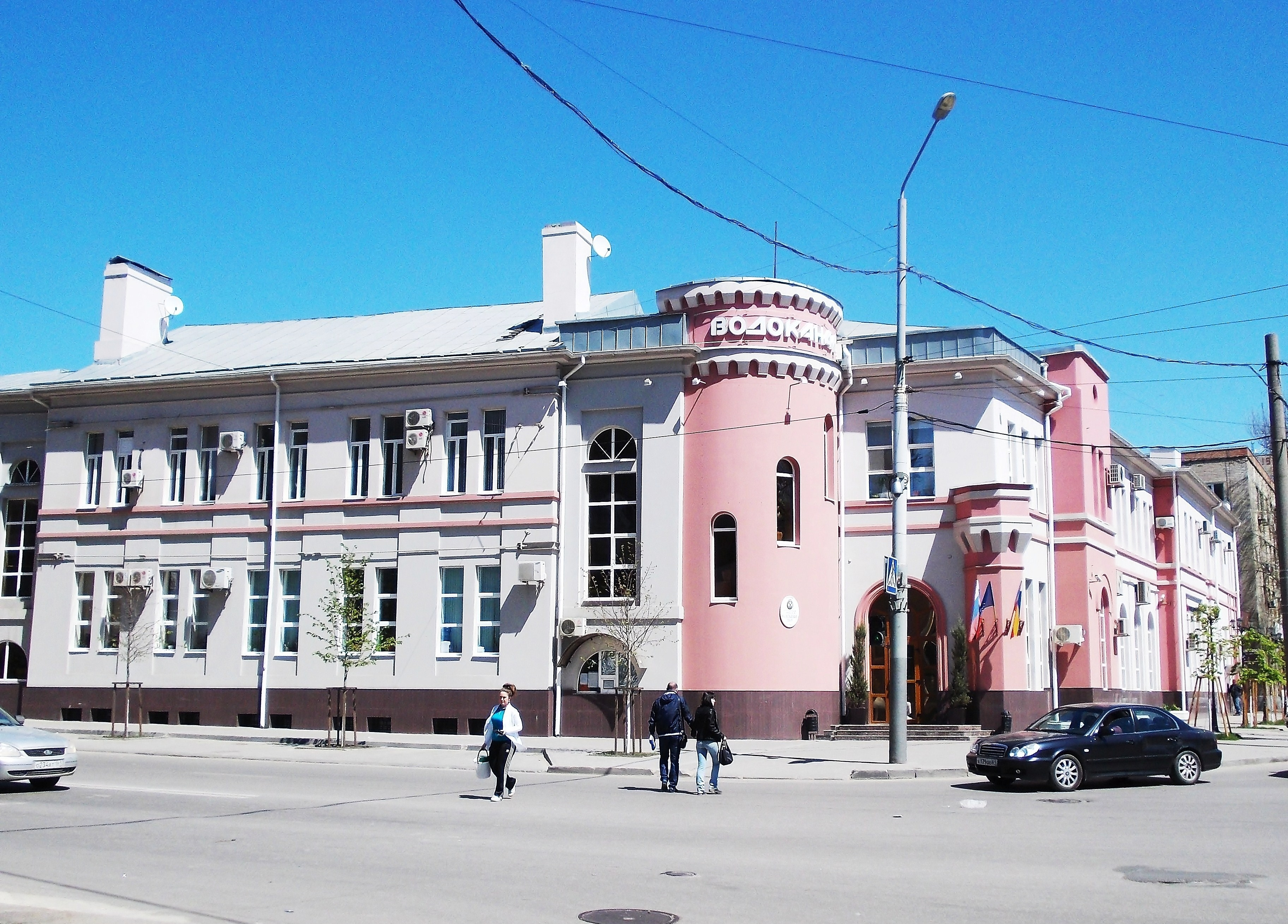
- Established: 2000
- Location: 293, Gorkiy street, Rostov-on-Don, Rostov oblast, Russia

The Rostov Waterpipe Museum (Russian: Музей Ростовского водопровода) is a museum in Rostov-on-Don, Rostov Oblast, Russia dedicated to the city water supply. Museum address: Rostov-on-Don, st. Maxim Gorky, 293.

== History ==
The Museum of the Rostov waterpipe was opened in 2000. A museum is located in Rostov-on-Don in the premises of the administrative building of OAO PO Vodokanal. The building itself belongs to the cultural attractions of the city. The museum was created on the initiative of its current head ZI Akopov. The centralized water supply of the city dates back to 1865. The whole history of its development is reflected in the museum's exposition. The importance of the city water pipeline is underlined by the opening in it of a bronze monument to the city water pipe installed in the Pokrovsky Square of Rostov-on-Don in commemoration of the 140th anniversary of the Vodokanal. The length of the first water pipe launched in Rostov-on-Don in 1865 was about 5.3 km. With the development and expansion of the city the water pipeline was also developed. Among the exhibits of the museum: fire hydrants, water-columns, pumping units and various adaptations of other plumbing equipment. The age of many of the exhibits is more than 100 years. At the stands there are photos and documents. According to the exhibits, one can learn about the technical progress in the field of water supply. In the center of the museum hall there is a plaster copy of the girl's sculpture with a bucket near the column. The same bronze sculpture is installed in the city. Behind the sculpture, there are five stands with photos devoted to the revival of the aqueduct. On the floor is a cast-iron sewer hatch. Visitors to the museum can see the map of the city with the scheme of the first water pipe, which was released in 1865, the old column, the first water meter in 1901, the hatches of the XIX century, the pre-revolutionary fire hydrant, etc. By modern exhibits one can see how much the capacities of the modern Rostov water pipe, progress in wastewater management, water supply and sanitation. Sixty museum stands present documents and photographs on the history of urban water supply and sewerage, the restoration of the enterprise in the postwar years, and the development of the company PO Vodokanal. In the museum there are materials about the employees of OJSC PO PO Vodokanal. Currently, this enterprise serves about 2,600 km of water pipes and about 1,260 km of sewerage networks. It provides water to more than 1.2 million people living in the cities of Rostov-on-Don, Aksay and Bataisk. In the hall of the enterprise there is a bust of the city's head - Andrei Matveyevich Baykov. By him the first water pipe was laid in Rostov-on-Don. In 2004 the Children's Environmental Center was opened in the museum.
