= Transfiguration Church, Starocherkasskaya =

Church building in Starocherkasskaya, Russia

Coordinates: 47.2466°N 40.0430°E

Transfiguration (Ratnenskaya) Church
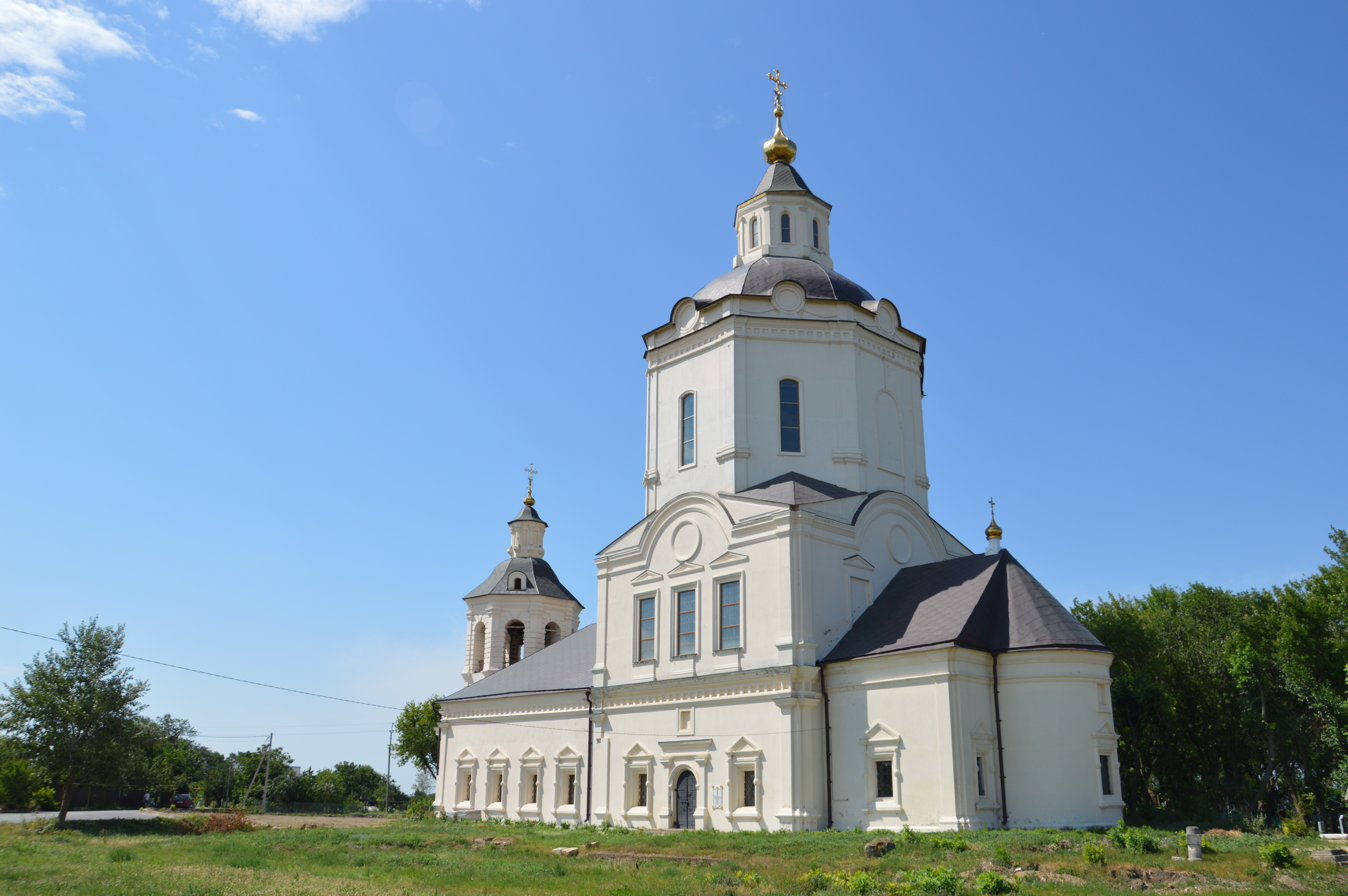
- Transfiguration Church

Religion
- Affiliation: Russian Orthodox

Location
- Location: Starocherkasskaya, Russia
- Interactive map of Transfiguration (Ratnenskaya) Church

Architecture
- Completed: 1740

The Transfiguration (Ratnenskaya) Church (Russian: Преображенская (Ратненская) церковь) ― one of the architectural landmarks of the stanitsa of Starocherkasskaya, Rostov Oblast, Russia. It is the first stone church in Starocherkassk ever built. This church was also the second oldest temple in the stanitsa. It was constructed on the site of the burnt wooden Church of St. Elijah by the same Moscow masters that built the bell tower of the Resurrection Cathedral.

== History ==
The Transfiguration Church is situated next to military cemetery that was established in 17th-20th centuries. The second name of the church ― Ratnaya, is linked to Ratny tract, which had long been a place of Cossack armies' assemble. According to historical sources it is known that in 1673 in the hills just north to Cherkassk there was built a town with a population of about 6,000 people. The reason for establishment of the settlement was the alliance of Don Cossacks and Russia in their fight against the Turks in Azov. Ratnaya Church, dedicated to St. Elijah was built in 1701. The completion is specified in a petition of the Don Cossacks to Tsar Peter I, in which the Cossacks requested some priests to be sent. Local archives point out that the church was made of wood as of 1718. Since 1735 the church is marked in Cherkassk maps. By decree of Elizabeth I on May 31, 1744, in Cherkassk began the construction of a stone church. The bell tower was built in 1751. During the construction there was brought 3276 kg of copper and tin for the production of bells. The church according to some sources, burnt down on August 12, 1744. In 1748 was another fire, and by 1781 the church was restored.

== Present Time ==
In Soviet times, from 1972 to 1979, professional restorers carried out extensive work, restoring the ancient church on the banks of the Don River.

A new phase of the church's restoration began in 2005. In 2025, restoration work continues inside the church, and a project for a new iconostasis has been completed.

Today, liturgical church life is active in the Transfiguration (Ratnensky) Church: Divine Liturgies, memorial services (panikhidas), and other rites (treby) are celebrated.

The tradition of holding Cross-bearing Processions with the participation of Cossacks is preserved. These processions start from the Resurrection Military Cathedral in the stanitsa of Starocherkasskaya, pause at the Transfiguration (Ratnensky) Church for a moleben (prayer service), and then proceed to the Monastery Tract. Processions are also held on the Altar Feast Days: the Prophet Elijah on August 2, the Transfiguration of the Lord on August 19, and the Holy Martyrs Florus and Laurus on August 31.

== Gallery ==
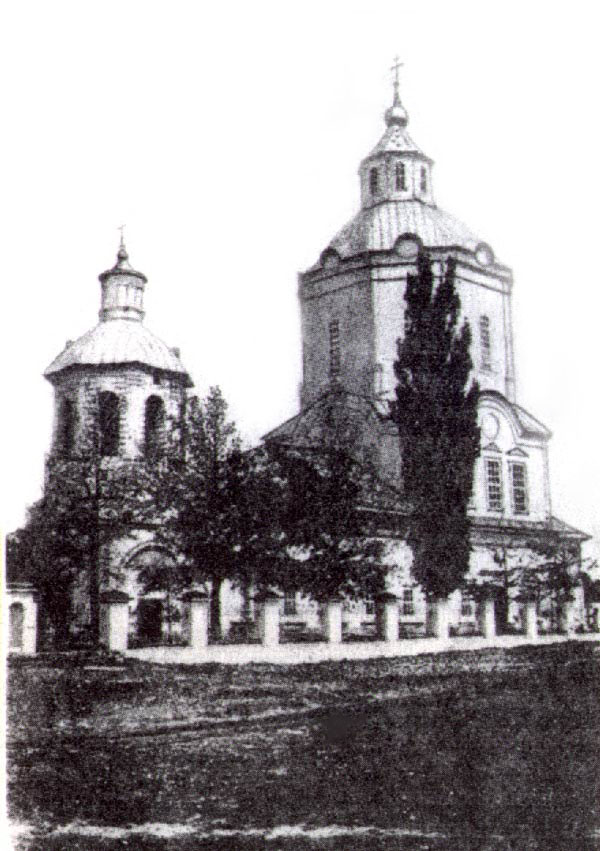
A photo taken in the beginning of the 20th century

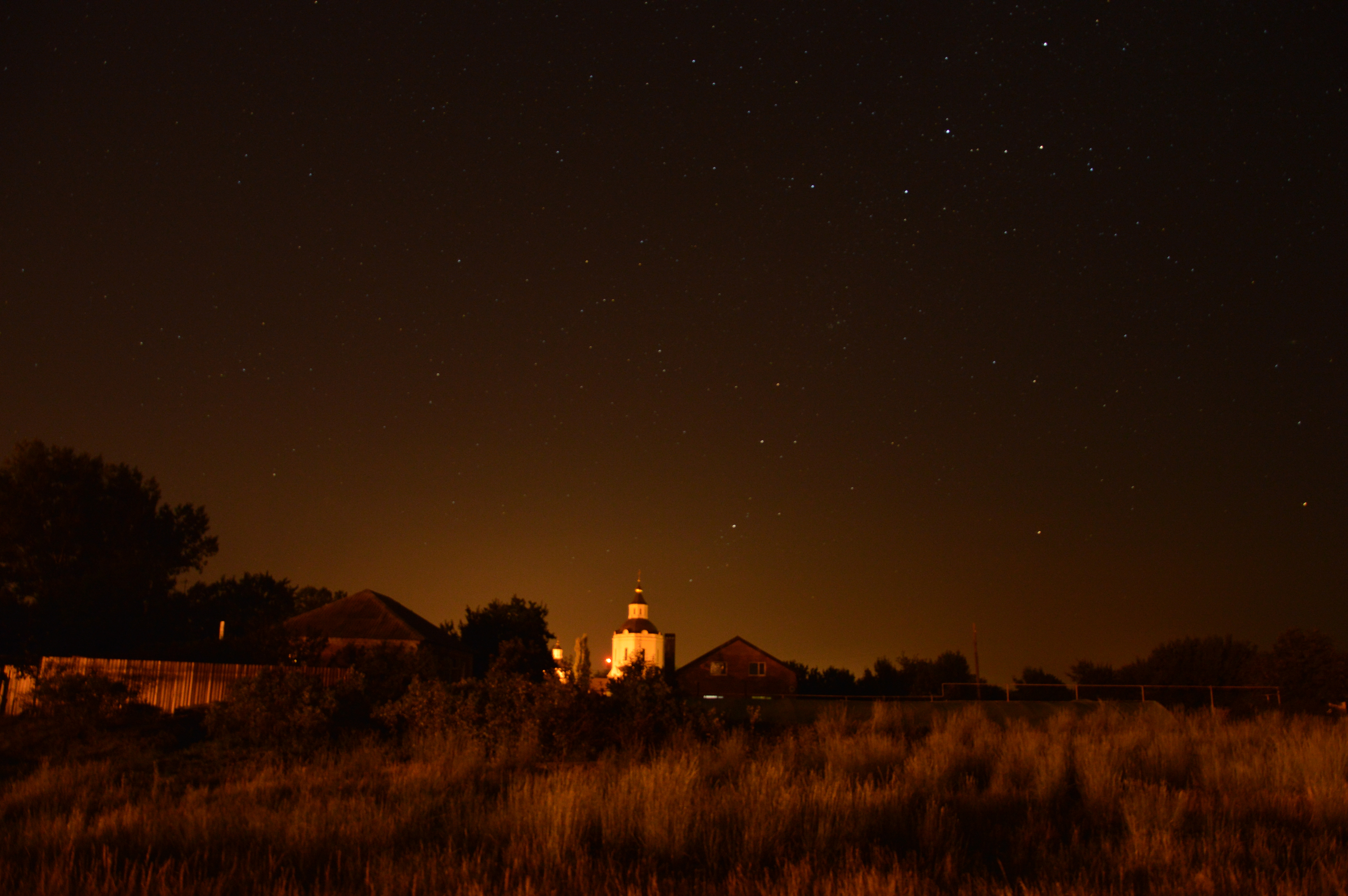
Transfiguration Church at night

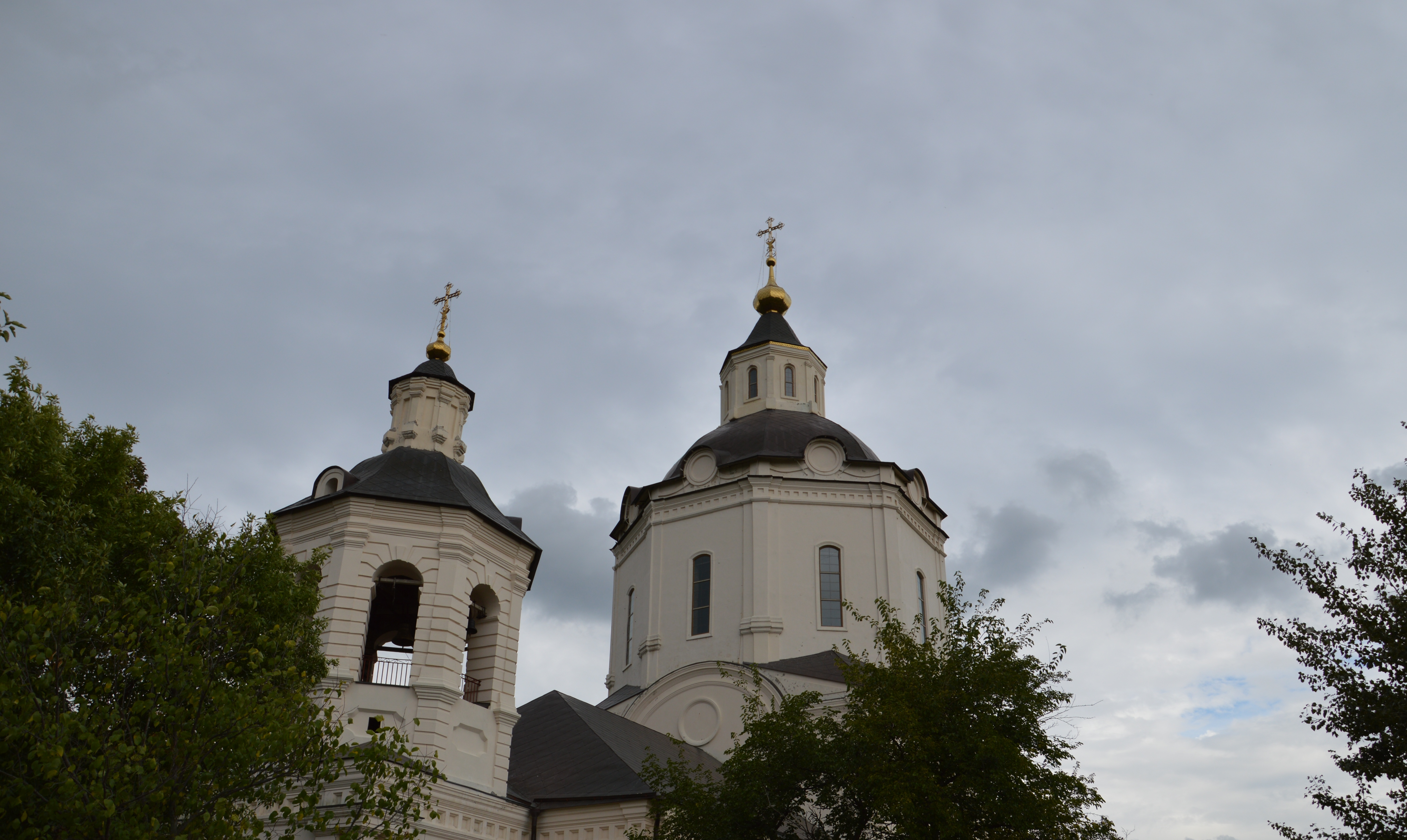
Transfiguration Church, 2013

== Altar Feast Days ==
August 2 (Gregorian calendar) – (Elijah the Prophet) – A non‑moveable church feast in honor of the Prophet Elijah (popularly known as Ilyin Day).

August 19 (Gregorian calendar) – (Transfiguration of the Lord) – One of the twelve great feasts, the Transfiguration of our Lord God and Savior Jesus Christ (popularly called Apple Savior or the Second Savior).

August 31 (Gregorian calendar) – (Florus and Laurus) – The day of remembrance of the Holy Martyrs Florus and Laurus (popularly known as Frolov Day).

== Sources ==
- Забазнов Ю. С. История создания и реконструкции Воскресенского собора в Старочеркасске 'Дон' — Ростов-на-Дону, 1979
- В. И. Кулишов. В низовьях Дона. Москва 'Искусство'. 1987.
- Славный град Черкасск. Собрание сочинений протоиерея Григория Левитского / сост. А.В. Шадрина, Л.А. Штавдакер; под общ. ред. акад. РАН Г.Г. Матишова; автор вступ. ст. и коммент. А.В. Шадрина. – Ростов-на-Дону: Издательство ЮНЦ РАН, 2024.

== Links ==
- Official website
