= Donskoy Convent =

Orthodox monastery in Rostov Oblast, Russia

Coordinates: 47.2394°N 40.0375°E

Donskoy Starocherkassk Monastery Старочеркасский монастырь в честь Донской иконы Божией Матери
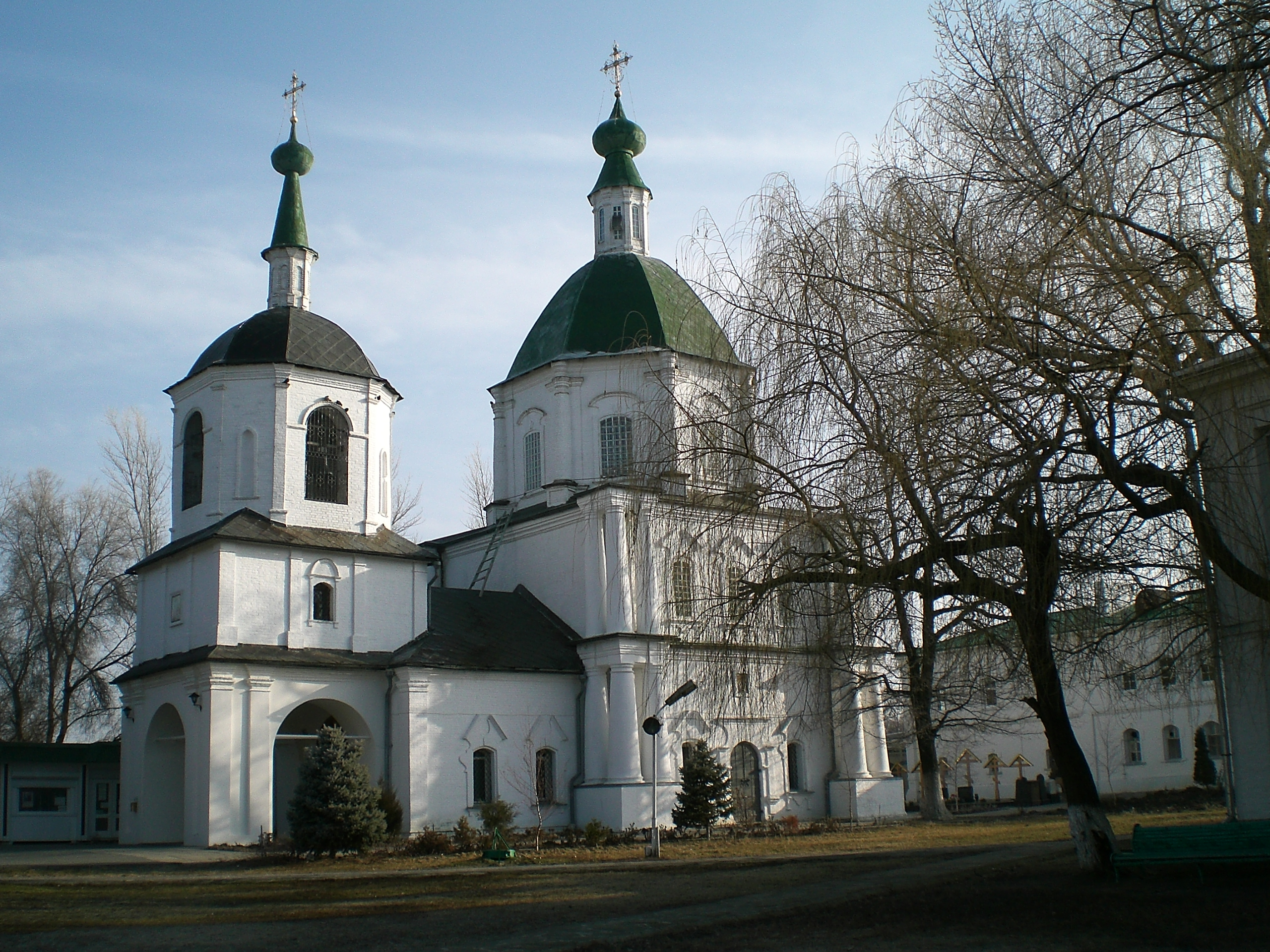
- The katholikon
- Interactive map of Donskoy Starocherkassk Monastery; Старочеркасский монастырь в честь Донской иконы Божией Матери

Monastery information
- Order: Russian Orthodox
- Established: 1994
- Diocese: Diocese of Rostov

Site
- Location: Starocherkasskaya, Aksaysky District, Rostov Oblast, Russia

The Donskoy Starocherkassk Convent (Russian: Старочеркасский монастырь в честь Донской иконы Божией Матери) ― an Orthodox monastery in the stanitsa of Starocherkasskaya, Aksaysky District of Rostov Oblast, Russia. It was established in 1994 on the territory of the former Efremov Convent, which had been functioning from 1837 to 1927, when it was ravaged by Soviet regime.

== History ==
The monastery is centered on the katholikon built between 1756 and 1761 by ataman Stepan Efremov to serve as his house church. Both the church and the monastery are dedicated to Our Lady of the Don.

The convent was inaugurated on September 12, 1837. Money for construction of the convent were donated by the widow of Colonel Daniil Efremov.

At the beginning of the 20th century in the monastery there were 16 salaried nuns, 2 supernumerary nuns, 96 frocked nuns, 135 lay sisters, and 250 people in total.

Relics of the monastery, as well as those of Resurrection Cathedral, were taken abroad during the times of Civil War. Before its reestablishment the monastery was administered by Starocherkassk Historical and Architectural Museum-Reserve.

The monastery was reestablished on October 5, 1994. Initially the monks settled in Starocherkassk in a rented private house and did restoration works of Don Church. They fertilized land around the temple put the graves in order and installed bells in the church.

The first prior of the revived monastery was Archimandrite Modest (Potapov) (1926 ― 2002), who took the veil from his confessor Metropolitan Zinovy (Mazhuga), who was canonized as a local saint.

In 2005, Macarius (Zelenkov) was appointed as a prior.

== Relics ==
Feast Day ― August 19 (Julian calendar), the day of celebration of Our Lady of the Don icon.

In 1995, the Cossacks from Gnilovskaya village gave to the monastery a big-sized Our Lady of the Don icon. It was placed in Resurrection Cathedral for a while, until the monastery church had been restored. Subsequently, the icon was solemnly transferred to the Church of Our Lady of the Don. Now it is kept in antechamber of the temple.

On the left to the choir in the monastery church there is the icon of St. Dimitry of Rostov, the patron of Don. It has and integrated reliquary with the relics of the saint.
