= Aksay dungeons =

Coordinates: 47.268557°N 39.896469°E

- Аксайские подземелья (Russian)
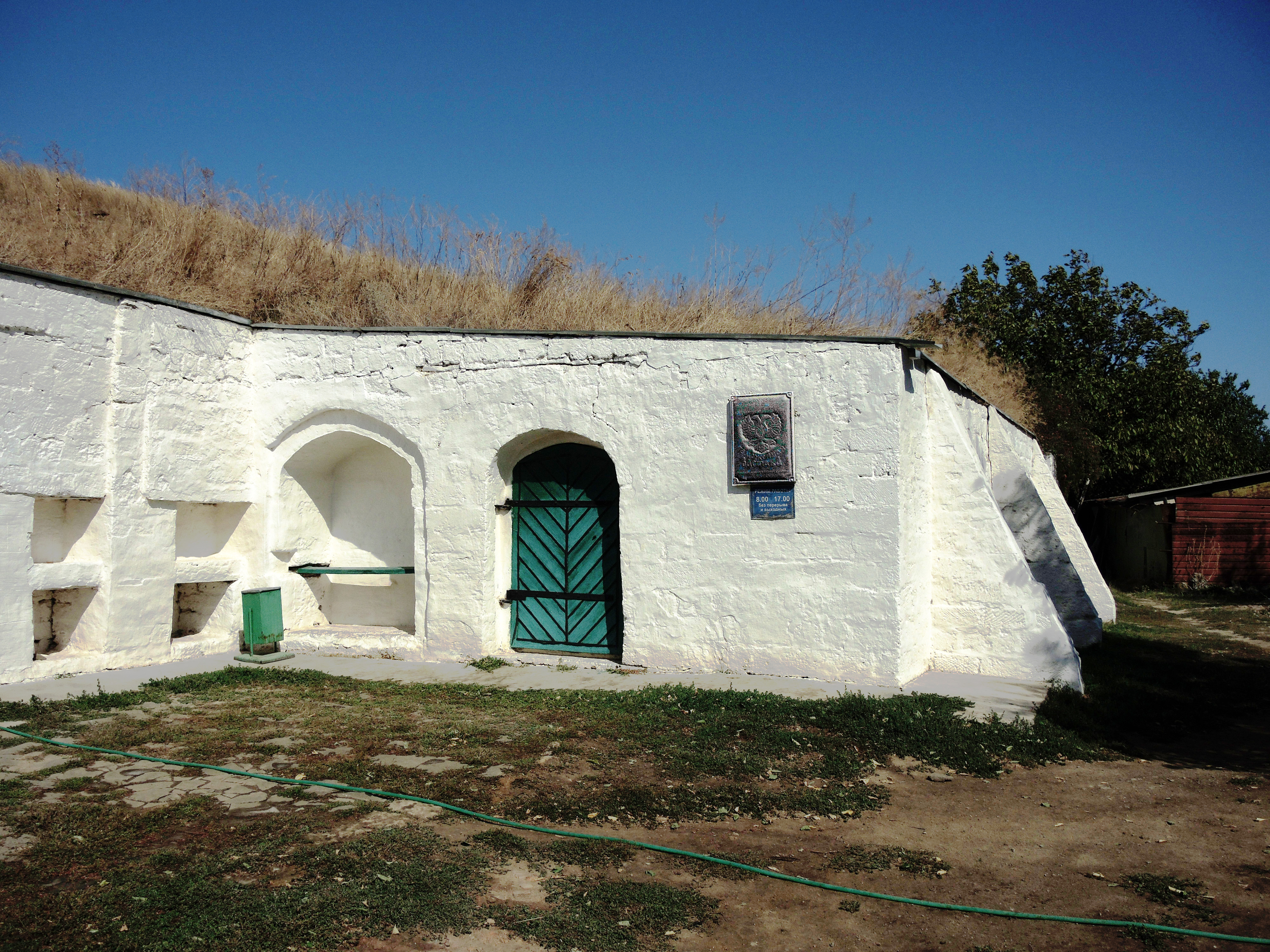

- Location within Russia
- Type: Fortress and Museum
- Location: Aksay, Rostov oblast Russia

History
- Built: XVIII

Aksay dungeons are dungeons of the town Aksay in Rostov oblast.

== History ==
The first recordings about the existence of the dungeons belong to the period of Peter the Great.

On the map with the first layout of the settlement, where the town is located now, the marks of the Turkish fortresses are visible. By the 1850s Aksai had about 30 underground structures of different purposes. According to the engineer Alexander Rigelman, who also built the fortress of Dmitry Rostovski in this area was an underground structure, which was located under the building. There were many entrances to the dungeons.

There was a well near the house No. 15 on Pugachev street earlier in Aksay. Limestone was used for its construction. There was a passage which led to the secret room. The well dates back to the 18th century. The water in the well was filled with 4–5 meters, the width of the well was small. Here was also discovered stage. Behind the wall of the well was a small room with wooden beds and empty bottles.

The list of objects that belong to the dungeons of the city of Aksay is quite large. It is an exposition of the military-historical Museum complex, which can be visited by tourists, the dungeons of the Customs Outpost Dating from the 18th century, the underground headquarters of the Squaw and the catacombs of the Kobyakov settlement, to which tourists have no access. Also these dungeons include tunnels Mukhina beams and caves.
