= Nikolai Gulayev =

Soviet World War II flying ace

Nikolai Dmitriyevich Gulayev
- Николай Дмитриевич Гулаев
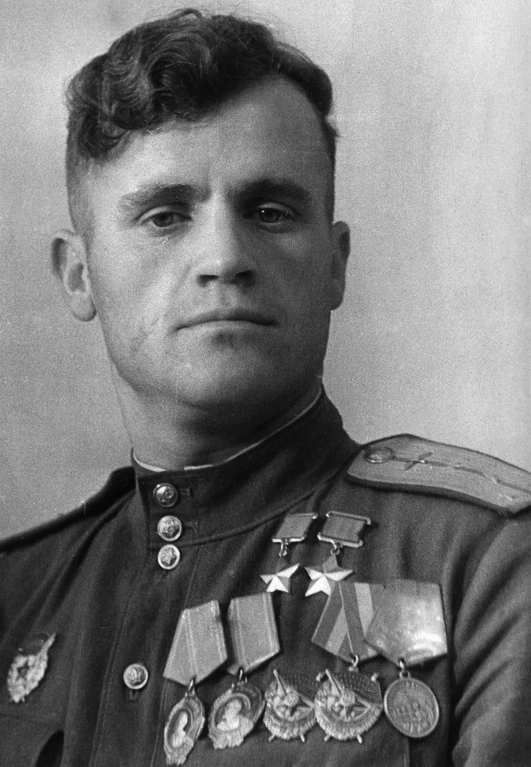
- Born: 26 February 1918; Aksay, Don Host Oblast, Russian SFSR
- Died: 27 September 1985 (aged 67); Moscow, Soviet Union
- Military career
- Allegiance: USSR
- Branch: Soviet Air Force
- Service years: 1938 – 1978
- Rank: Colonel-General of Aviation
- Conflicts: World War II; Eastern Front
- Awards: Hero of the Soviet Union (twice)

Nikolai Dmitriyevich Gulayev (Russian: Николай Дмитриевич Гулаев; 26 February 1918 – 27 September 1985) was the fourth highest scoring Soviet flying ace from World War II, with over 50 individual aerial victories. He went on to become a Colonel-General of Aviation in the Soviet Air Forces.

== Early life ==
Gulayev was born on 26 February 1918 to a working-class Russian family in Aksai village. After completing secondary school in 1934, he attended a vocational school until 1935 and then worked at an enamel factory in Rostov while training at a local aeroclub. He left his factory job to join the military in December 1938 after completing training at the aeroclub.

== World War II ==
Two years after joining the military Gulayev graduated from the Stalingrad Military Aviation School and was assigned to a fighter aviation regiment in the Belorussian Military District. He was sent to the front in June 1941 after the German invasion of the Soviet Union as part of the 162nd Fighter Aviation Regiment on the Western Front, but did not begin flying combat missions until August 1942. From July to September 1941 he underwent retraining in Kuznetsk as part of the 13th Reserve Fighter Aviation Regiment. After completing training he was assigned to the 423rd Fighter Aviation Defense Regiment where he served from April to August 1942 until he was reassigned as commander of the 487th Fighter Aviation Defense Regiment. Despite holding the position of regimental commander he flew missions on MiG-3 and Yak-7B aircraft to provide air cover to strategically important areas of Gorky and Voronezh. On 3 August he scored his first aerial victory when he shot down a Heinkel He 111 at night. He did not receive permission to takeoff from his superior and was reprimanded for making the departure but especially given his lack of training in flying at night but was later praised for the successful shootdown of an approaching enemy aircraft.

In January 1943 he completed navigator's courses from the 3rd Reserve Aviation Brigade based in Saratov and was sent to the 27th Fighter Aviation Regiment as deputy regimental commander. In addition to serving as deputy regimental commander he served as a navigator and squadron commander on missions; the unit later received the Guards designation and was renamed the 129th Guards Fighter Aviation Regiment in October 1943. He distinguished himself in battles over the Voronezh and Steppe fronts and in the battles of Kursk, the Dnieper, Kirovograd, Korsun Shevchenko, Umansko-Botoshanskoy, and Lvov-Sandomir. On 14 May 1943 he rammed a Junkers Ju 87 dive bomber with his Yak-1 over Gostishchevo, Belgorod and bailed out with his parachute after running out of ammunition taking out two other German planes. In June he made his first flight on a Bell P-39 Airacobra; in early July he led a formation of four fighters in an attack on a numerically superior enemy formation of roughly 100 aircraft. All four of his squadron's aircraft safely landed after shooting down enemy four bombers and two fighters, disrupting the formation. That same day his formation made more combat missions and collectively shot down 16 enemy aircraft. For his heroism in aerial combat and his first 95 sorties he was awarded his first Hero of the Soviet Union gold star on 28 September 1943 by decree of the Supreme Soviet.

In early 1944 he served as squadron commander of a group of six Bell P-39 Airacobras and led them in an attack on a formation of 27 bombers led by eight fighters. Within the span of four minutes the group shot down eleven enemy aircraft, five of which were shot down by Gulayev himself, making him an ace-in-a day. On three other occasions other he personally shot down four planes over the course of a single day. After an aerial engagement on 31 May 1944 he sustained a serious wound to his right hand that required surgery, but managed to lead his squadron back to the airfield just before passing out. On 1 July 1944 he received his second gold star for his service. After recovering in the hospital he went back to flying combat missions in August and scored three more victories, but was soon recalled from the front lines to attend the Air Force Academy like many other flying aces from the war. In total he made 200 combat sorties and fought in 69 aerial engagements, scoring 55 individual and five shared (Note: Most sources report he scored 55 individual kills and five group kills, but some report he scored 57 individual kills and 3 group kills.) aerial victories in the process, giving him one of the highest kill ratios of any allied ace in the war.

== Postwar life ==
After the war Gulayev graduated from the Zhukovsky Air Force Academy in 1950 and then went on to hold various leadership positions in the Soviet Air Forces. In 1960 he graduated from the Military Academy of the General Staff and was appointed as commander of the 15th Air Defense Division in Lipetsk, where he served until he was transferred to the 2nd Air Defense Corps in the Tver oblast. He rose through the ranks and held multiple commands before reaching the rank of Colonel-General in 1972. In 1974 he became the deputy commander-in-chief of the combat training division of the Air Defense Forces and in 1976 went on to become the assistant commander of the armament division Moscow Air Defense District, a position he held until he retired from the military in 1979. He died on 27 September 1985 in Moscow and was buried in the Kuntsevo Cemetery.

== Awards and honors ==
Soviet

- Twice Hero of the Soviet Union (28 September 1943 and 1 July 1944)
- Two Order of Lenin (28 September 1943)
- Order of the October Revolution (4 March 1975)
- Four Order of the Red Banner (15 May 1943, 21 January 1944, 29 April 1957, 23 February 1971)
- Two Order of the Patriotic War 1st class (22 October 1944 and 11 March 1985)
- Two Order of the Red Star (22 February 1955 and 26 October 1955)
- campaign and jubilee medals

Foreign

- Poland - Gold Cross of Merit (6 October 1973)
- Romania - Orders of Tudor Vladimirescu 2nd class
- East Germany - Patriotic Order of Merit 2nd class
