= Aksay customs outpost =

Coordinates: 47°16′07″N 39°53′47″E

- Аксайская таможенная застава (Russian)
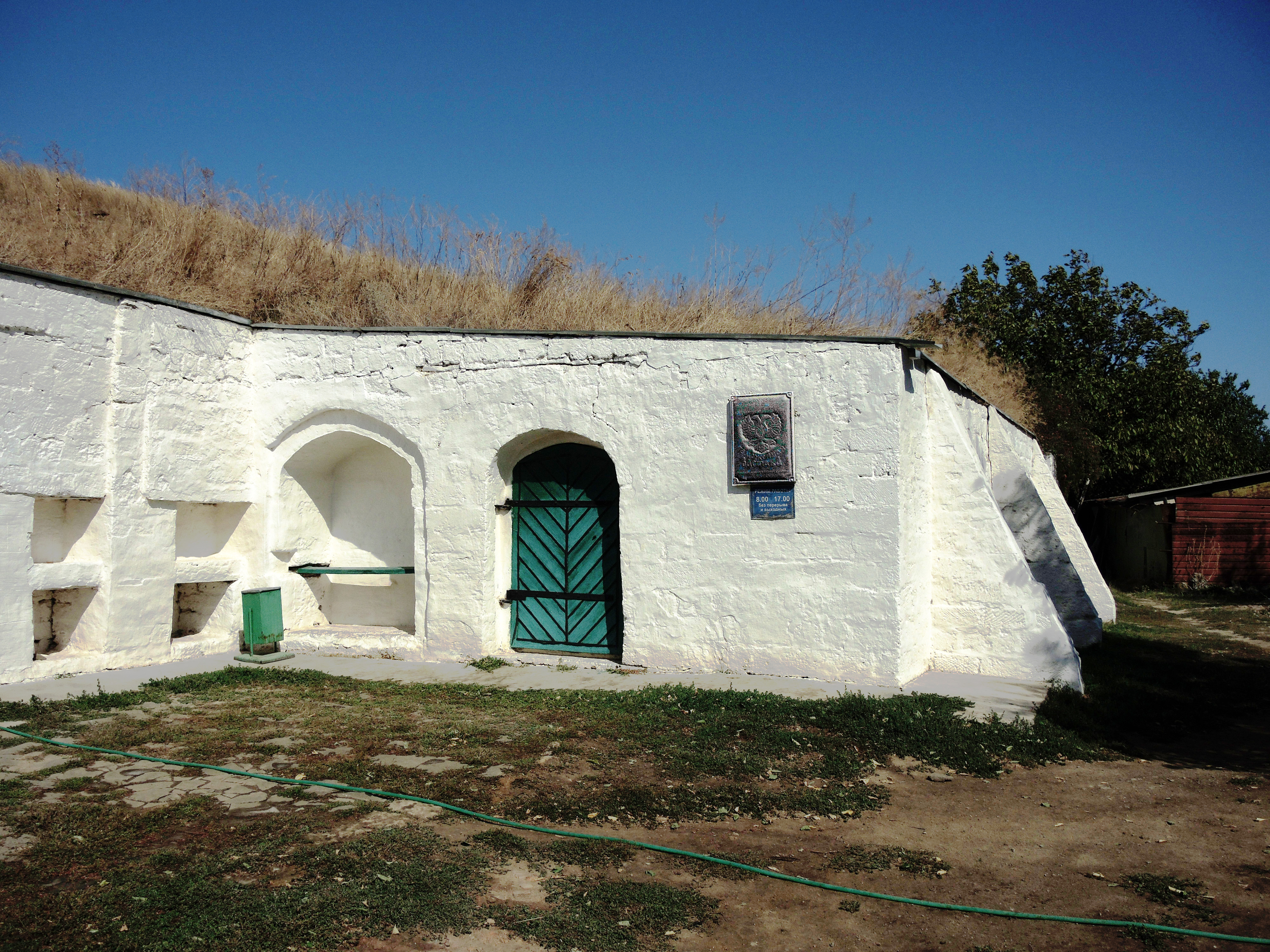

- Location within Russia
- Type: Fortress and Museum
- Location: Aksay, Rostov oblast Russia

History
- Built: 1763

The Aksay customs outpost (Russian: Аксайская таможенная застава) is an earthen fortification construction situated in the Aksay, Rostov region of Russia. It is located on the territory of the former Don Noble estate at the mouth of Small Log Beam. The Czar's outpost was originally built on this territory, followed by a customs post. Erected in the second half of the 18th century, the building is part of the Dmitryi Rostovskiy fortress complex maintained by the military-historical Museum of Aksay.

== History ==
The fortress was built according to the redoubt project standards of the time. The trenches and open space for the Casemates were built and then surrounded by brick walls. Logs and beams were used to construct the walls, which were covered with several layers of rammed and dried clay extracted from the banks of the river. Ventilation channels were added to the ceilings. The walls were approximately 10 meters (33 ft) thick and provided protection against shelling. The erection was completed in the year 1763.

The military-strategic importance of the Aksay fortress was its geographical position at the crossroads of eight trade routes. In the period of the Russo-Turkish wars, the fortress helped to defend Azov, which belonged to Russia following the Constantinople peace treaty in 1700.
