= Kondraty Bulavin house =

Coordinates: 47°14′18″N 40°02′06″E

- Дом Булавина (Russian)
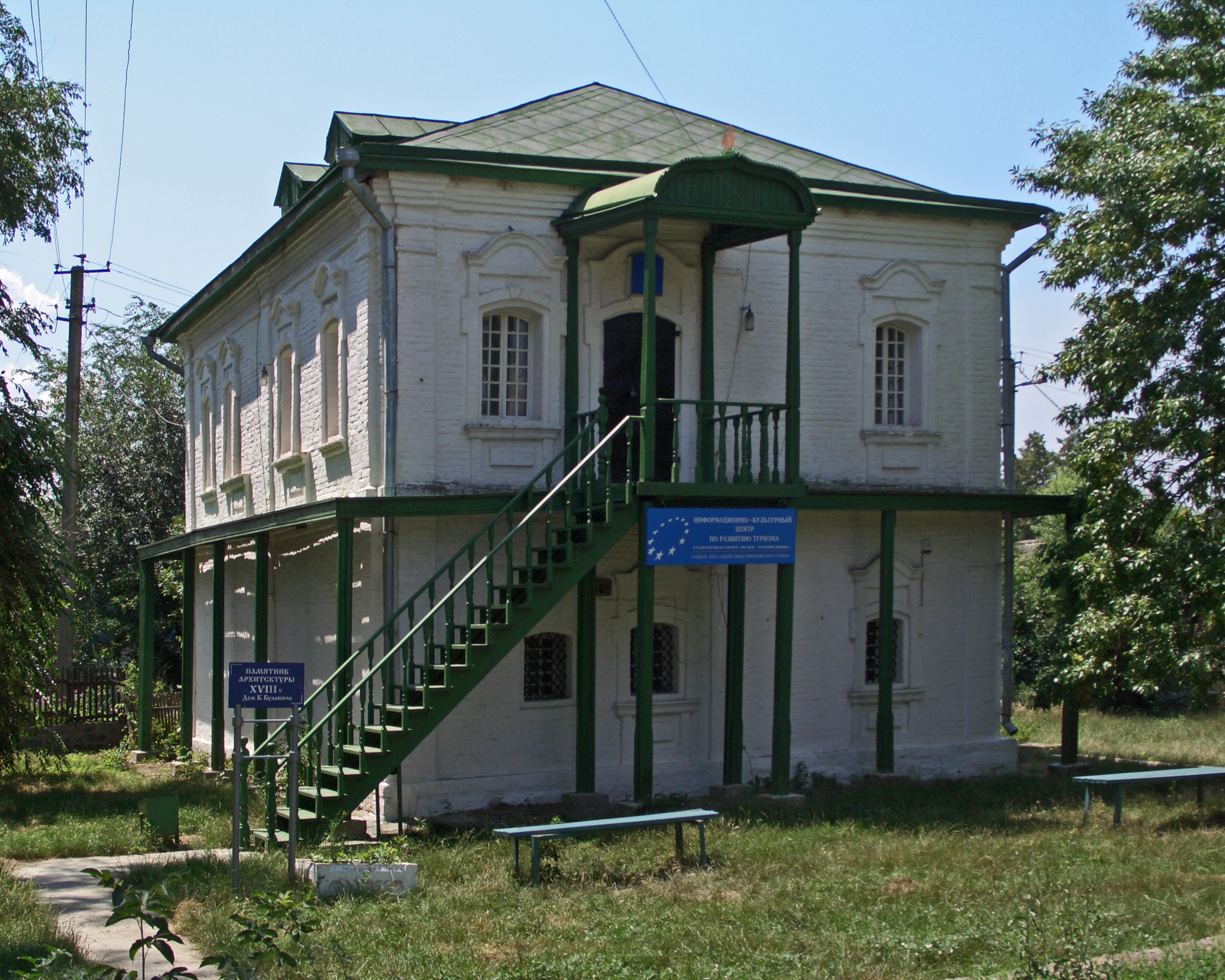

- Location within Rostov Oblast
- Type: Fortress and Museum
- Location: Starocherkasskaya, Rostov Oblast, Russia

The Kondraty Bulavin house, or Bulavin house (Russian: Дом Булавина) is a historical building located not far from the main square of Starocherkasskaya.

== History ==
The house is reputed to have been the place where Kondraty Bulavin, the leader of the Bulavin Rebellion, a peasant war between 1707-1709 lived and died. The house was not Bulavin's property, but was requisitioned by him in 1708 after his capture of Cherkassk and his proclamation as ataman.

The house is an example of stone residential architecture of the first half of the 18th century. The building is square, the walls are about a meter thick, there are vaulted ceilings, lattice windows, and metal doors. These are the signs of a fortified house.

Since the October Revolution in 1917, the building has gradually fallen into disrepair. Annexes were built which distorted the original appearance.
