= Church of the Assumption (Aksay) =

The Church of the Assumption of the Blessed Virgin Mary
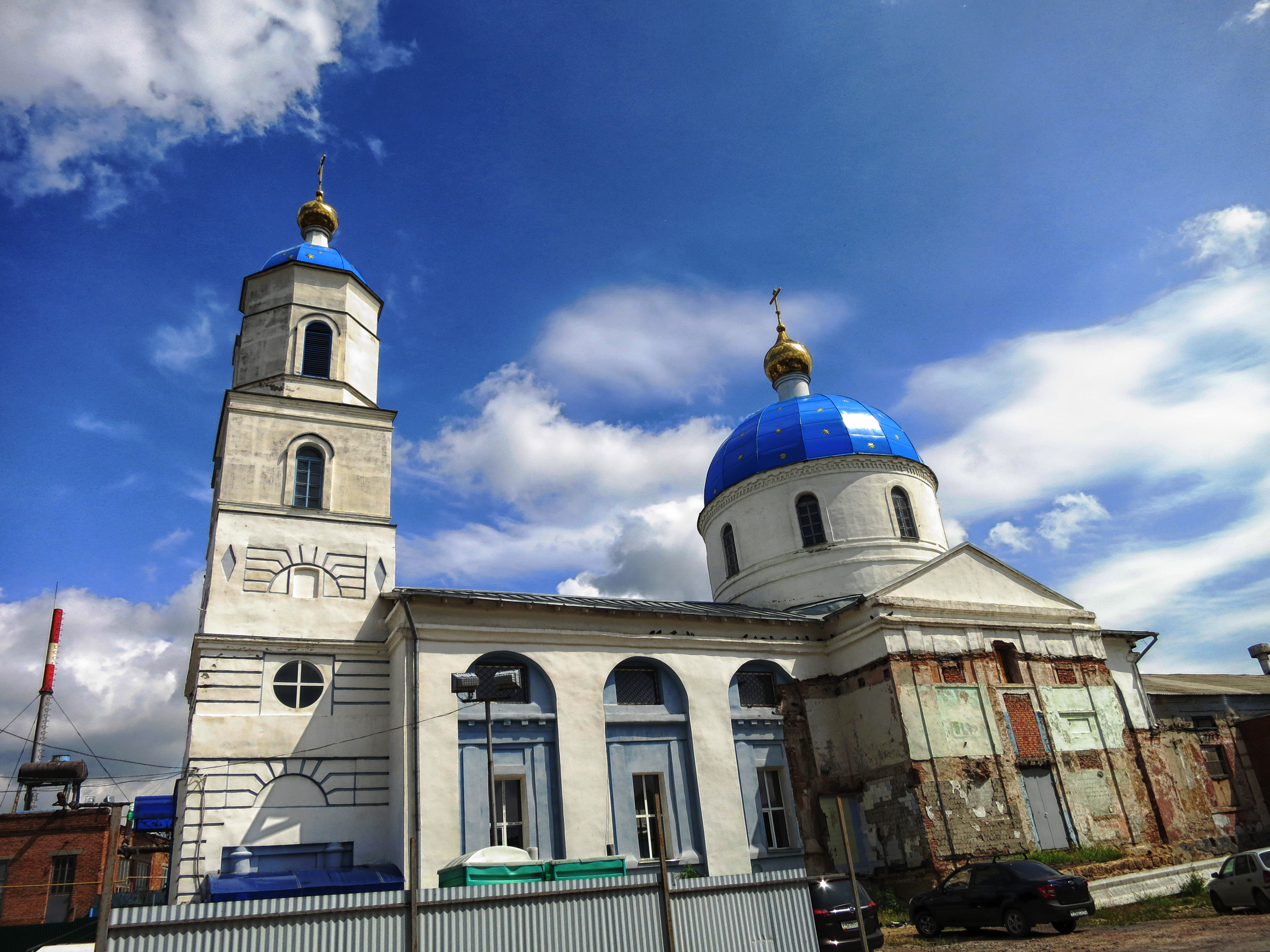

- Location within Russia

Religion
- Affiliation: Russian Orthodox

Location
- Location: Aksay, Rostov Oblast, Russia
- Coordinates: 47.1548°N 39.5210°E

Architecture
- Completed: 1825

The Church of the Assumption of the Blessed Virgin Mary Russian: Церковь Успения Пресвятой Богородицы is a Russian Orthodox church in the city of Aksay, Rostov Oblast, Russia that was built in 1825 in Empire style. It belongs to the Diocese of Rostov and Novocherkassk.

== History ==
The construction of the Assumption Church in Aksay began in 1822 with the blessing of Bishop of Voronezh and Cherkassk. It was built on the funds donated by local dwellers and merchants from Tula. The author of the building project was architect Mikhail Abrosimov.

The church was completed and consecrated in 1825. The church has the form a Latin cross and is flanked by a three-level bell tower 22 meter high. In 1837 the original iconostasis was replaced by a richer one.

The church was closed by the Soviet authorities in 1930s. After World War II the building served as an agricultural machinery repair shop.

In 1995 the church was handed over to the Orthodox community of Aksay and on August 28, 1995, religious services resumed there. The dome was rebuilt in 1998.

== Literature ==
(In Russian)

- В. Гладченко «Свято-успенский храм с золотыми куполами» // Победа; 2004г No. 130–132.
