= Bulavin Rebellion =

1707-1708 Cossack revolt against Russian rule

Don Cossack Rebellion of 1707–1708
Date	8 October 1707 – 7 July 1708 (O.S.)
Location	Don Cossack Host and parts of Sloboda Ukraine, Tsardom of Russia
Result	Russian victory: Death of Kondraty Bulavin; Rebellion crushed

Belligerents
Tsardom of Russia: Izium Regiment; Don Host (1707-1708); Kazakh Khanate	Don Cossack rebels (1707-1708); Don Host (1708); Zaporozhian Cossacks

Commanders and leaders
Peter the Great; Yuri Dolgorukov †; Vasily Dolgorukov; Fedir Shydlovskyi; Lukyan Maksimov (executed) (Kazakh Khanate) Tauke Khan	Kondraty Bulavin †; Ignat Nekrasov

The Bulavin Rebellion (Russian: Булавинское восстание, romanized: Bulavinskoye vosstaniye; Восстание Булавина, Vosstaniye Bulavina) was a war which took place in the years 1707 and 1708 between the Don Cossacks and the Tsardom of Russia. Kondraty Bulavin, a democratically elected Ataman of the Don Cossacks, led the Cossack rebels. The conflict was triggered by a number of underlying tensions between the Moscow government under Peter I of Russia, the Cossacks, and Russian peasants fleeing from serfdom in Russia to gain freedom in the autonomous Don area. It started with the 1707 assassination of Prince Yury Vladimirovich Dolgorukov, the leader of Imperial army's punitive expedition to the Don area, by Don Cossacks under Bulavin's command. The end of the rebellion came with Bulavin's death in 1708.

== Underlying causes ==
A number of social grievances were prevalent in the peasant population of Russia in the years leading up to the Bulavin Rebellion. Peter the Great's radical reforms designed to "Westernize" old Muscovy in the 18th century were met with widespread discontent. The pious, deeply conservative masses saw his reforms as an affront to their traditional way of life and to their Eastern Orthodox faith. Peter was even equated to the Anti-Christ and assumed to be an impostor posing as the true Tsar. On top of this, Peter's newly formed police state was expanding territorially, and by this expansion was encroaching upon salt resource sites coveted by the Cossacks for preservation of their foods. This dispute over land was in one sense an economic issue, but the Cossacks also regarded this as an intrusion upon their semi-autonomous political state. In general, the entire rural Russian atmosphere was in an agitated state, waiting for a catalyst of some kind.

The situation was complicated by the tensions between Don and Sloboda Cossacks, whose lands bordered each other in the area of Bakhmut. Starting from the late 17th century, Bakhmut had served as major centre of salt production along with the nearby Tor fortress, which was controlled by Don Cossacks. As Bakhmut's population consisted predominantly of Cossacks from Sloboda Ukraine, in 1703 Peter I appointed Izium colonel Fedir Shydlovskyi to govern the city. The new administration barred outsiders from obtaining salt in its territory, which produced great dissatisfaction among the Don Cossacks.

== Immediate catalyst ==
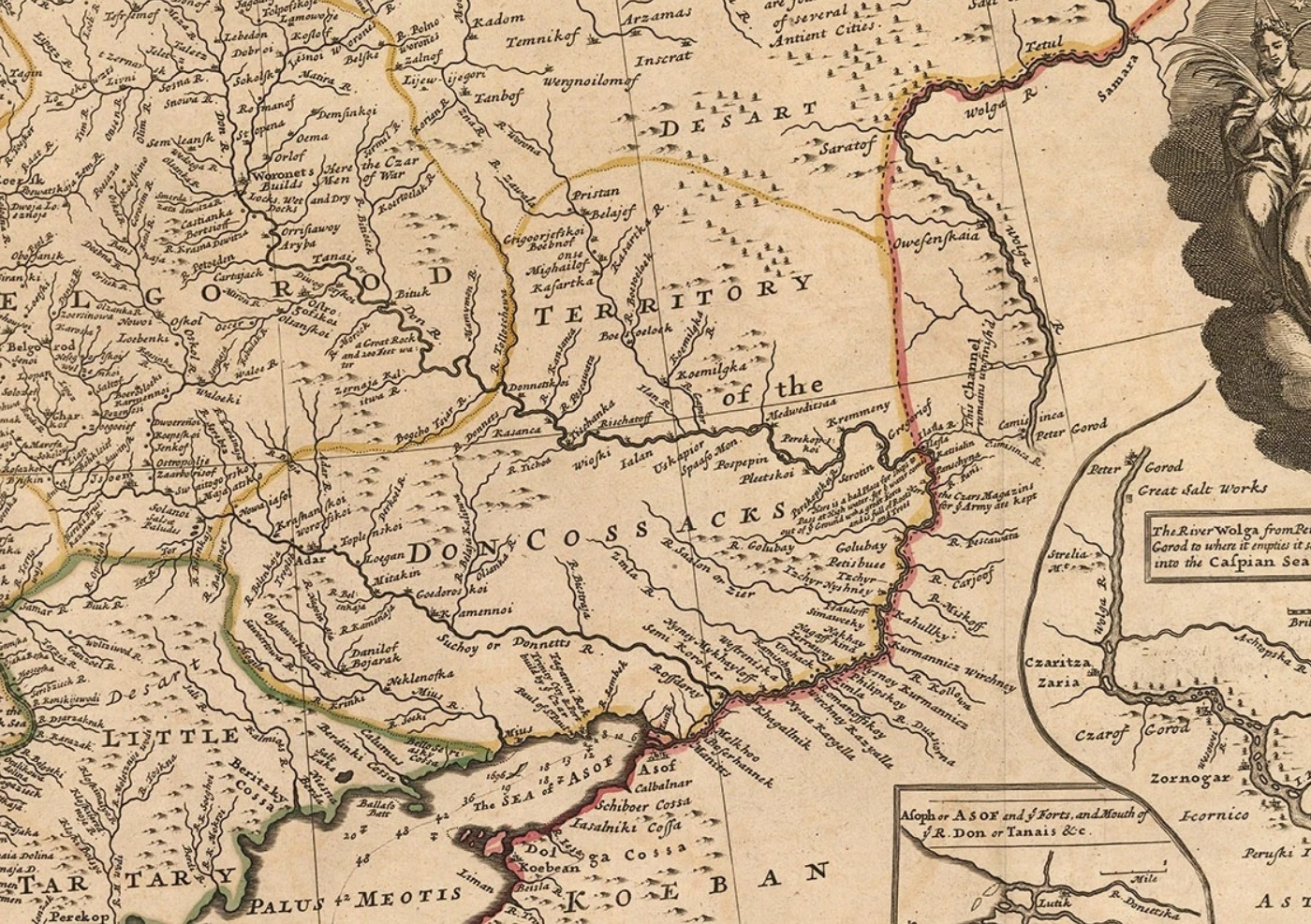
A 1715 map showing the territory of Don Cossack Host and adjacent areas of Sloboda Ukraine (part of Belgorod Razriad) in the west

In 1705, a group of Don Cossacks captured Bakhmut and proclaimed its leader Kondraty Bulavin the town's ataman. Bulavin was born into a Don Cossack family in Triokhizbenka (now in Luhansk Oblast), where his father, a petty noble from Saltov, served as a stanitsa ataman. Bulavin would have been old enough to remember Stenka Razin's revolt during the late 17th century. He had developed some combat experience fighting the Kuban and Crimean Tatars in his youth. However, Bulavin was never a particularly great military commander, and throughout the rebellion that bears his name, he would forever fall short of becoming an undisputed leader. Bulavin was most likely illiterate, but like his contemporary revolutionaries, he possessed a talent for appealing to the people and inciting them to action.

After capturing Bakhmut, Bulavin deflected an attack by Izium Cossacks ordered to recapture the town by the voivode of Belgorod. He also arrested the envoy sent by Azov governor Fyodor Apraksin with a demand to vacate the town. Finally, an order by Don Host ataman Lukyan Maksimov forced Bulavin to leave. However, during their retreat his men destroyed the salt works on the Severski Donets as an act of retaliation for having been evicted by the government as squatters. The conflict was ultimately absorbed into the greater rebellion as it gained momentum.

In response to the constraints and fears of living in Peter's police state, large numbers of serfs absconded, abandoning the major urban areas, especially Moscow and the new capital at St. Petersburg. While some groups emigrated to Poland or Austria, many chose to avoid the border patrols and instead fled to the rural periphery and the river regions already inhabited by the Cossacks. It was Peter's policy to hunt down and arrest absconders and return them to their lords where they could be counted for taxes, a policy which, by this time, had no statute of limitations. However, according to Don Cossack tradition, it was forbidden to deliver newcomers who settled in their area to authorities.

As a reaction to the Don Cossacks' refusal to cooperate, Peter deployed a group of bounty hunters under Yuri Dolgorukov to scout their regions for fugitive peasants. Despite the fact that the Cossacks harbored some resentment towards the peasants (for overpopulating their region and generally competing for local resources), more deplorable to them was the idea of Petrine agents roaming freely through their territory. They not only refused to give up the fugitive peasants, but on 8 October 1707 a small band of local atamans headed by Kondraty Bulavin ambushed and murdered Dolgorukov and his men in the village of Shulgin on the Aidar River, opening the door to violence and beginning the Bulavin Rebellion.

== Course of the uprising ==
=== Beginning and retreat ===
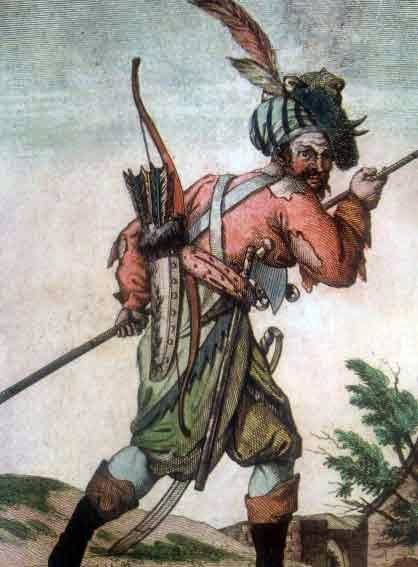
Don Cossack infantryman on a 17th century engraving

Bulavin's rally cries were simple: the goal was to move against Moscow and destroy the evil influences on the Tsar. The rebellion was not against the institution of Tsardom but against the figures in power at the time. It was generally believed that Peter was either not who he claimed (i.e. the Antichrist sitting in place of the true Tsar who was hidden away), or that he was indeed the rightful Tsar but was under the control of evil advisers whose destruction would liberate him, and that if given the freedom to act, he would repudiate all of his wicked reforms.

The rebellion suffered from a number of weaknesses. For one, despite all of his rallying, Bulavin never offered a pretender to the throne or suggested a just tsar to replace Peter. This blunder would condemn the rebellion's end goals to ambiguity and would let slip an immeasurable amount of support he might have mustered. Second, Bulavin did not coordinate his efforts with any other pre-existing Muscovite enemies, so despite being heavily engaged in war with Sweden, the military apparatus under Peter was not as divided as it could have been and found the rebellion to be more of a nuisance than a major conflict. Additionally, Sloboda Cossacks supported Peter I due to their previous territorial conflict with Bulavin. Even the leadership of Don Cossack Host refused to support Bulavin and gathered its forces to oppose the rebels. As a result, one month after the start of the rebellion, the insurgents were defeated on the Aidar River with the help of Kalmyk cavalry, and Bulavin was forced to flee.

=== Alliance with Zaporozhians and new offensives ===
After retreating to Bakhmut, Bulavin established contact with Zaporozhian Cossacks and Crimeans, and moved to the Sich, which was at the time formally subordinate to hetman Ivan Mazepa. The hetman, then still a loyal ally of Peter I, ordered the local administration to arrest Bulavin, but the Cossacks refused. As a result, the rebellious ataman established his camp in Kodak, and later reached Zvonets, where he founded his headquarters.

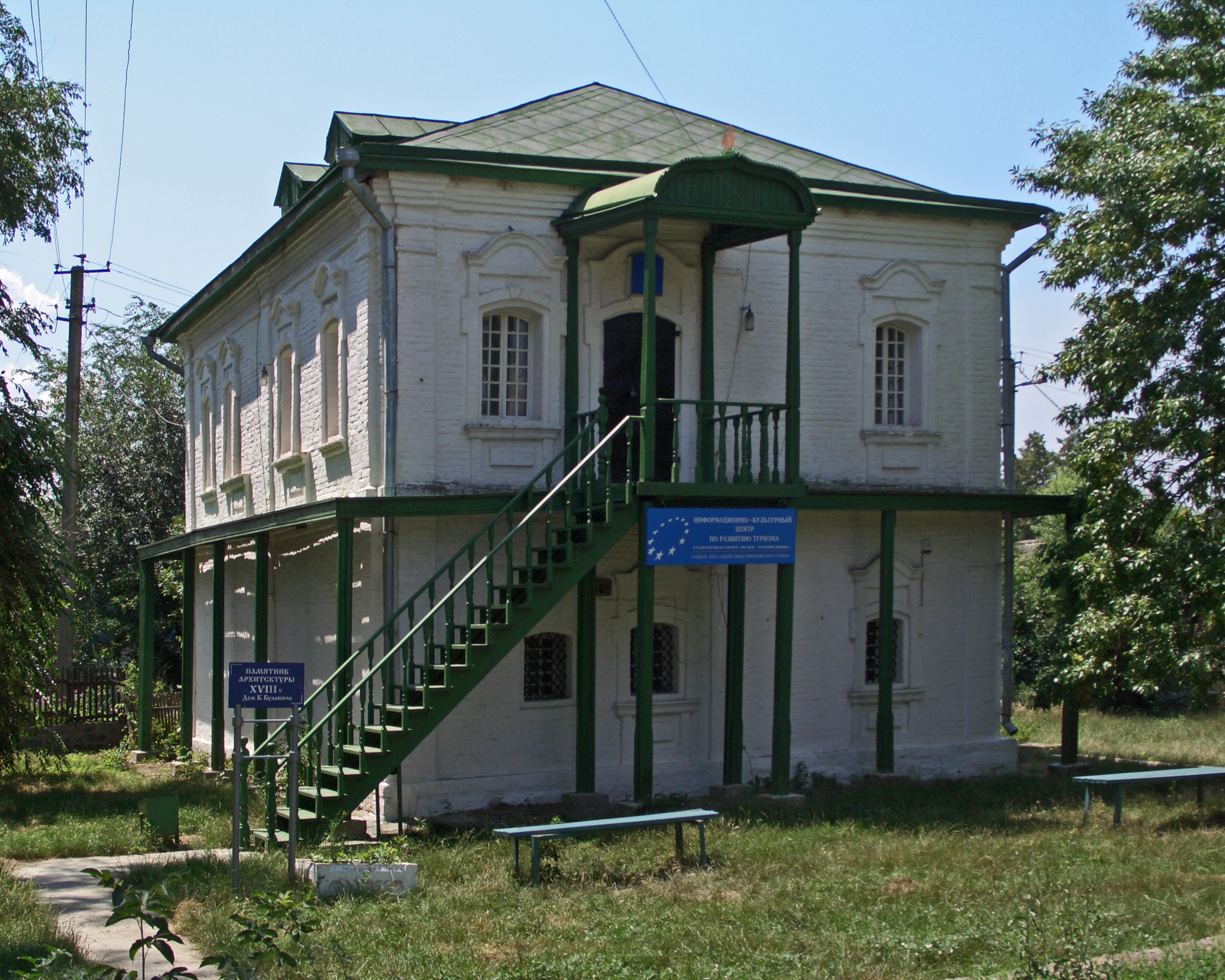
Kondraty Bulavin house, Starocherkassk

Having established his base in Zaporozhia, Bulavin sent appeals for Don Cossacks to join his uprising, promising to protect the ancient rights and freedoms and offering patronage to the Old Believers. As a result, popular unrest spread around the Don, and Bulavin used it to avenge his previous defeat and march on the host's capital in Cherkassk. On 1 May 1708 an uprising of poorer Cossacks allowed the rebels to take the city with little resistance. In the aftermath, chief ataman Lukyan Maksimov and his deputies were executed, and their property and treasury was divided between Bulavin's men. The new administration also limited prices of bread in order to guarantee popular support. On 9 May Bulavin was officially elected ataman of the Don Host.

After his election, Bulavin barred the Cossacks from mentioning the tsar's name, de-facto proclaiming Don an independent state. In order to subdue the revolt, Peter I gathered an army of 30,000 soldiers, headed by Vasily Vladimirovich Dolgorukov, the brother of the deceased Yuri. In these circumstances, Bulavin pleaded the government for peace, simultaneously looking for allies abroad. However, only Zaporozhian Cossacks provided him significant support. In order to gain initiative, rebel forces started an offensive, approaching Saratov and managing to capture Tsaritsyn and Kamyshin. However, Bulavin's men were unable to take the fortress of Azov, which was located in their rear.

=== Defeat ===
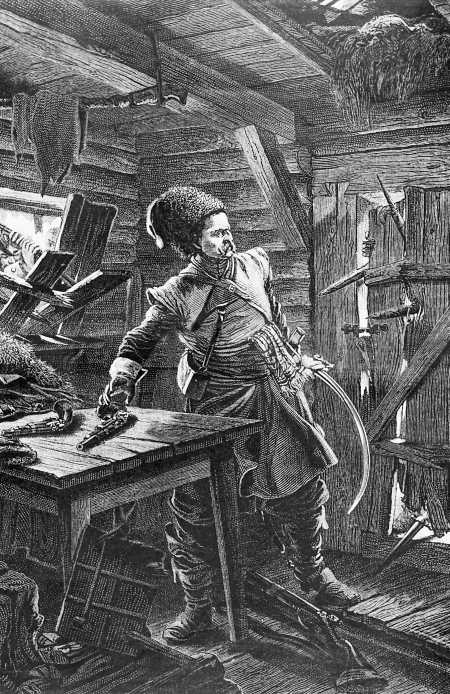
Death of Bulavin on a 19th century illustration

As an answer to the rebellion, the tsar's forces started a campaign of terror against Don Cossacks, plundering and burning the captured stanitsas and murdering their civilian population. By means of its vastly superior size and efficiency, the regular army was ultimately capable of stamping out the rebellion at all levels. In the end, angered by devastating reversals and Bulavin's tiring claims, factions of his own Cossack followers turned against him under the leadership of one Ilya Zershchikov. In July the conspirators attacked Bulavin's residence, surrounding the ataman and his close supporters. After a fierce battle, on 7 July 1708 Bulavin was found dead, having been shot in the head. It is not known whether the wound was self-inflicted or an act of treachery. According to a common version, the ataman killed himself after observing, that the attackers were preparing to burn his house. After being captured by the attackers, Bulavin's body was sent to Azov, where the tsar's administration decapitated and hanged it.

Following Bulavin's death, the rebellion petered out, with pockets of resistance persisting through 1709. His follower Ignat Nekrasov, known for his successful actions at Tsaritsyn, attempted to organize the rebels under a new command, but finally retreated to Kuban, settling in the lands of Crimean khan Devlet II Giray.

== Political and social aftermath ==
As mentioned, the Bulavin Rebellion bore striking similarities to Razin's Revolt a generation earlier. Both were Cossack rebellions in part, aimed against an imposing governmental institution and driven by animosity for the miserable state of peasant life. They effectively set the stage for the Pugachev Uprising under Catherine the Great.

In response to the uprising, Peter tightened his grip on the Don Cossacks, depriving them of part fo their lands and liquidating most elements of self-government in the area. As a result, a group of 2000 Cossacks under Ignat Nekrasov fled under protection of the Crimean Khanate. Descendants of these Nekrasovites would relocate to Anatolia during the Pugachev Uprising and settle near Constantinople, where their traditional culture would continue to the present day.

In the aftermath of the uprising, Cossacks of Izium Sloboda Regiment recaptured Bakhmut and turned it into a fortress. However, conflicts with the Don Cossacks continued until 1715, when salt factories in the area were transferred under the management of state treasury. In 1745 a separate Bakhmut Cossack Host was established by the government from a number of settlers from the Don and Sloboda Ukraine. In 1748 it was transformed into a regular cavalry regiment, tasked with guarding the local salt production from Kalmyk and Nogai raids.

== Legacy ==
In 1971 a monument to Bulavin was installed in central Bakhmut.
