= Aksay Post House =

Russian complex

Aksay post house
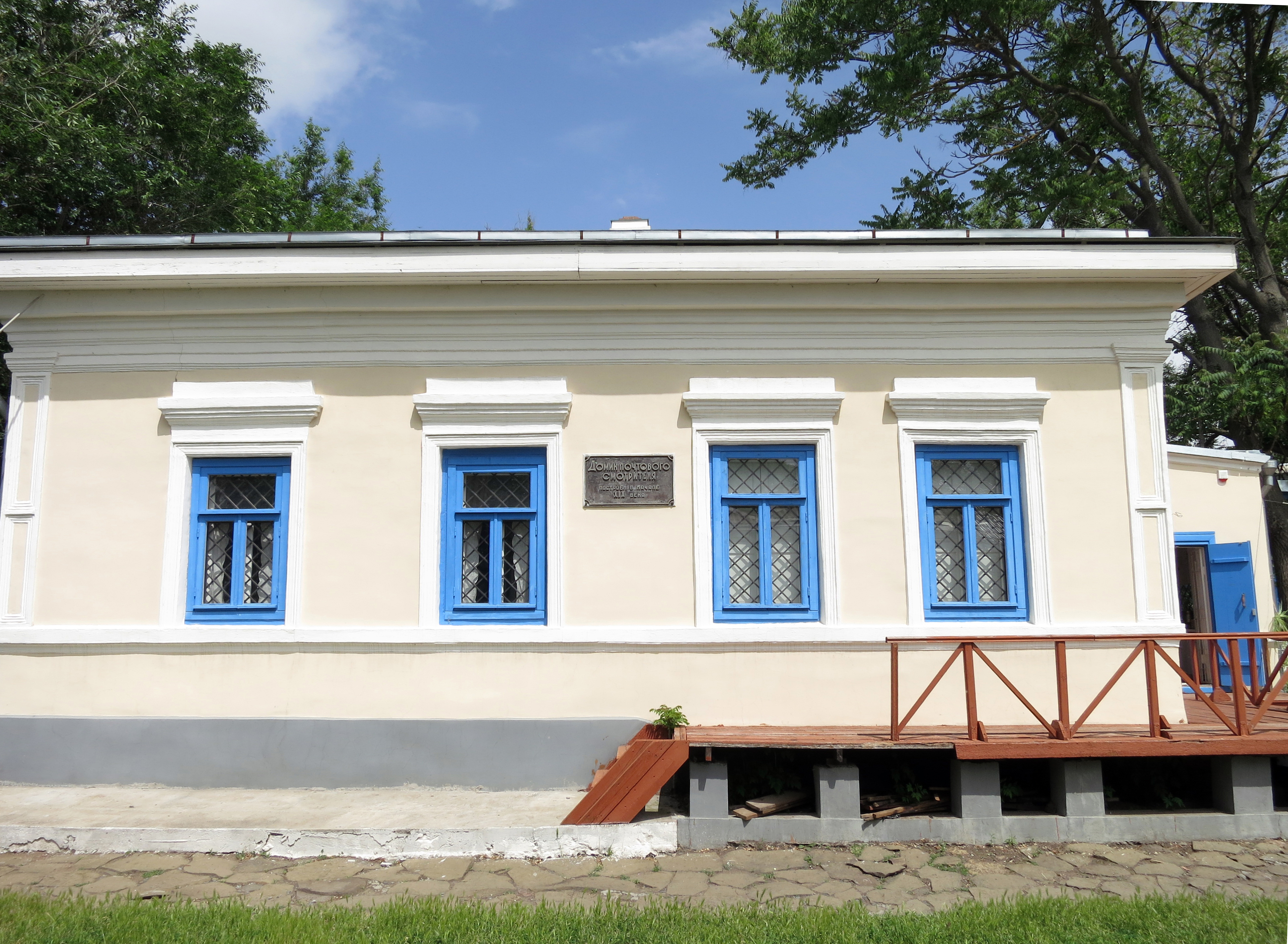
- Aksay post house

- Location within Russia
- Established: 1992
- Location: 3, Budyonnogo street, Aksay, Rostov oblast Russia
- Coordinates: 47.251074°N 39.865031°E

The Aksay post house (Russian: Аксайская почтовая станция, romanized: Aksayskaya pochtovaya stantsiia) is a complex of small buildings of historic posting station in Aksay, Rostov oblast, Russia. It consists of residential facilities and household building. Aksay post house is affiliate of the Aksay war-historical museum. The complex is considered to be an object of cultural heritage.

== History ==
The post house was opened in the 19th century in Aksay. It hosted mail coaches and carriages every day. Alexander Pushkin, Mikhail Lermontov, Alexander Griboyedov, Leo Tolstoi, Alexei Tolstoy, Nicholas I, Alexander I, Alexander II, Peter Tchaikovsky, Nikolay Raevsky, exiled Decembrists and other Russian prominent figures travelled through the station. The museum opened here in 1992. Original interior was reconstructed inside of the post house.

The Pereprava ("River crossing") monument was open alongside of main museum entrance in 1985. It was erected in memory of evacuation of civilian residents from Rostov-on-Don. Fierce fighting took place in the Don region during the Second World War. In 1941-1943 stanitsa of Aksayskaya (now Aksay) was occupied by the Wehrmacht twice. The Pereprava monument consist of truck GAZ-MM and air defence guns on an inclined pedestal. Antiaircraft battery of the 3rd battalion of 495th artillery regiment secured the evacuation of the natives of Rostov-on-Don across the river Don.

== Description ==
The museum complex consists also of keeper's house, hotel building, water well, coach-house and arbor. The post house has several permanent exhibitions. The collection of animal-powered transport in the coach-house feature carts, sled, phaeton britzka from the 19th century. The collection of ancient artefacts (fossils, archaeological finds from the Stone Age, Bronze Age, Iron Age and the Middle Ages) occupies the main museum building. All the exhibits were found in the Aksay river basin.

== Gallery ==
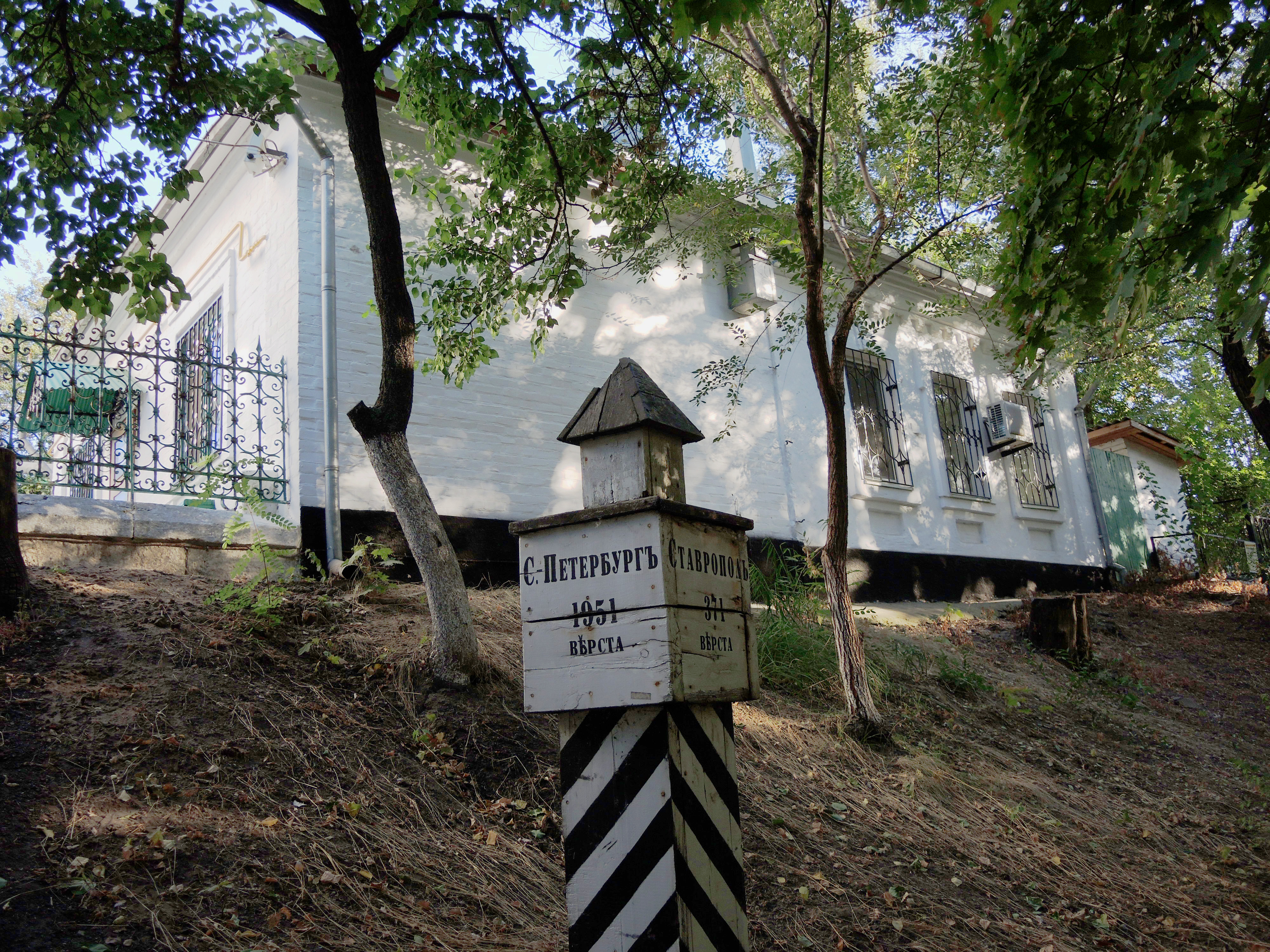
Mile stone

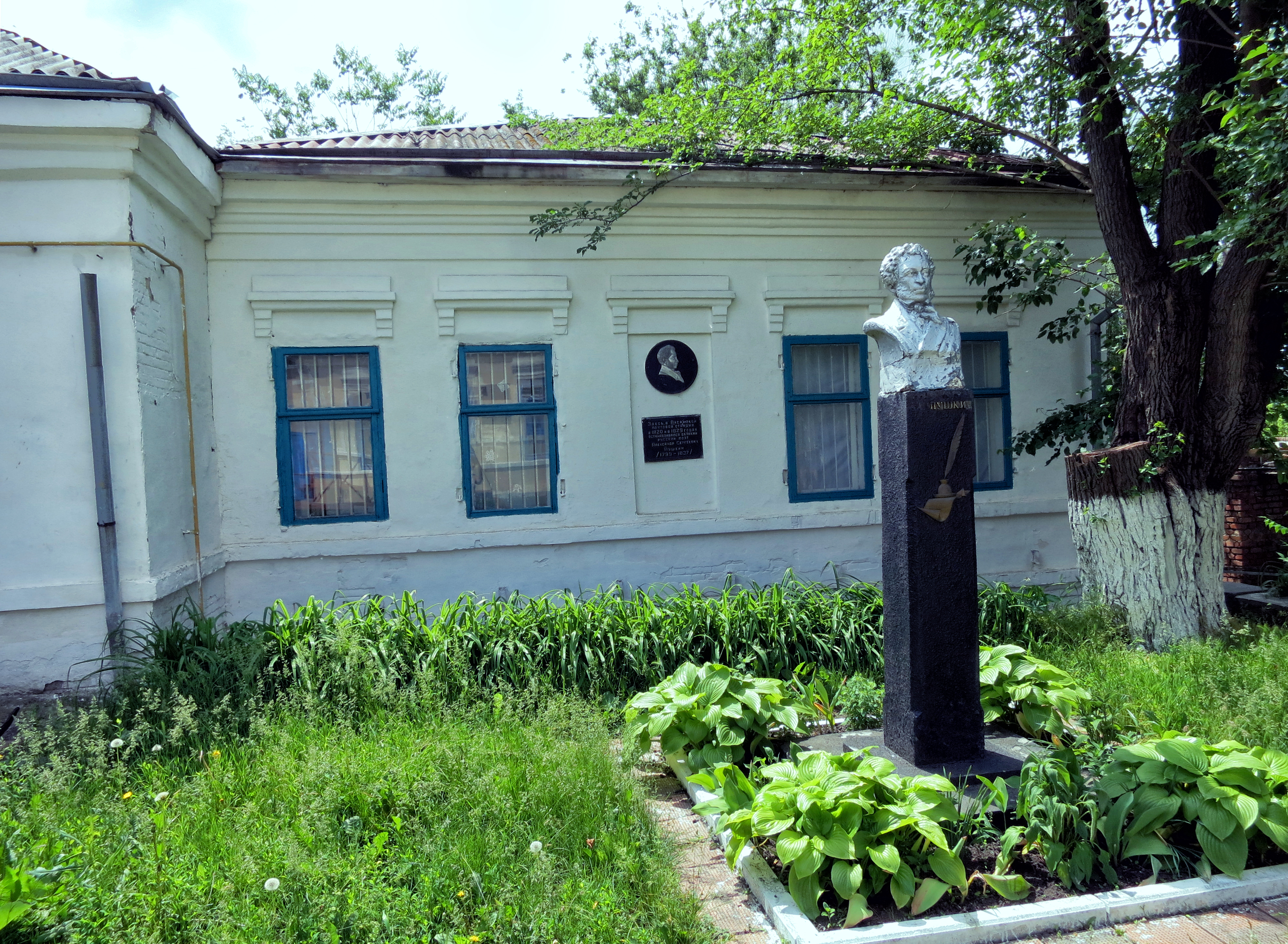
Bust of Alexander Pushkin
