= Starocherkasskaya =

Rural locality in Aksaysky District, Rostov Oblast, Russia

Coordinates: 47.242°N 40.036°E

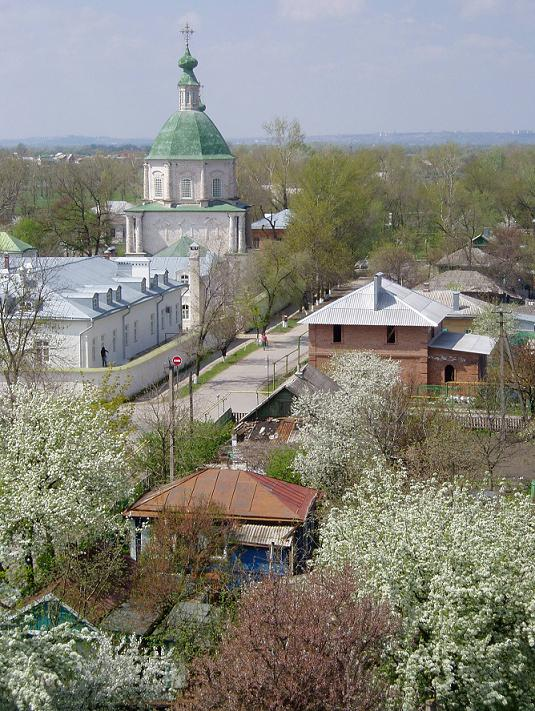
Cherkassk houses and Petropavlovsk Church seen from the bell tower of the Resurrection Cathedral

Starocherkasskaya (Russian: Старочерка́сская, lit. 'Old Cherkassk'), formerly Cherkassk (Черка́сск), is a rural locality (a stanitsa) in Aksaysky District of Rostov Oblast, Russia, with origins dating from the late 16th century. It is located on the right bank of the Don River approximately 35 kilometers (22 mi) upstream from the major Russian port city of Rostov-on-Don.

It is famous for having been the center of Don Cossack culture and politics for nearly two centuries as the capital of the Don Host Oblast. Due to regular spring floods that submerged the small city on several occasions, the Cossacks moved their capital to higher ground at Novocherkassk in 1805.

In and around Starocherkasskaya there are over forty noteworthy historical and cultural sites including the Resurrection (Voskresensky) Cathedral, completed in 1719, and its famous gilded wooden iconostasis.

== History ==
A Cossack fortress on the island of what was later called Monastyrsky on the Don river was probably built before 1570 although it is first mentioned in chronicles from 1593. After fifty years it became the capital of the Don Cossacks, first as an independent entity in between Russia, Turkey and Poland, then a vassal of the Russian tzars, then as an administrative region, then as the Don Voisko Province of the Russian Empire.

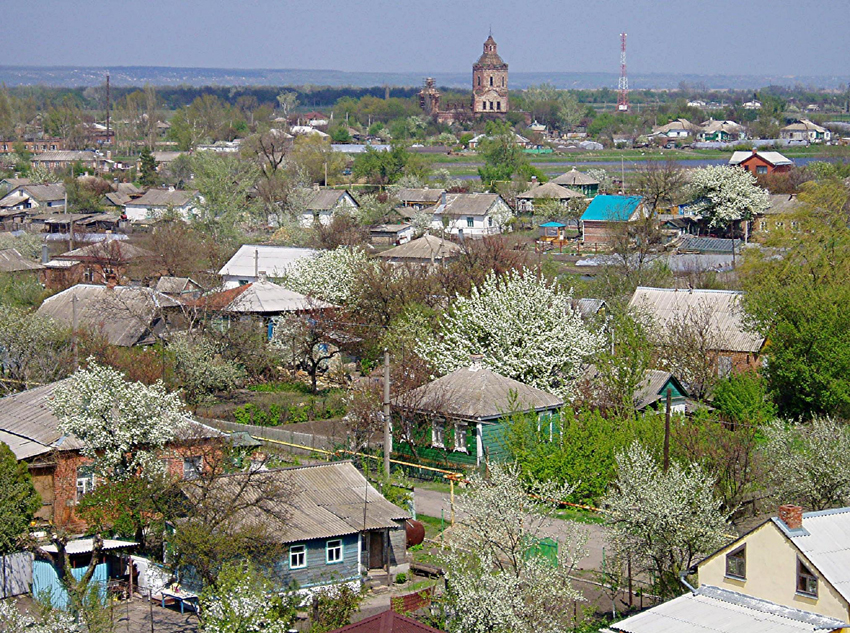
Looking toward the Transfiguration (Preobrazhensky) Cathedral

In its heyday in the 18th century, Cherkassk was a busy city with a strong fortress. The city was the major residence of quite a few famous Don cossacks of the 17th and 18th centuries, including Stepan Razin, Yermak Timofeyevich, Kondraty Bulavin and Matvei Platov. It was also the location of fierce battles between Russian, Ottoman, Crimean and Cossack forces.

Being on an island, the city's position was very convenient for a fortress and military camp, but inconvenient for an administrative and trade center — in spring the island was flooded by Don river and the crowded wooden city was subject to devastating fires.

In 1805, the Don Voisko Province's ataman, Matvei Platov moved the capital to the newly and specially built city of Novocherkassk (literally New-Cherkassk), which was on a hill, about 40 kilometres from Cherkassk. Most of the residents of Cherkassk moved to the new capital. The remnants of the old city got the name of the stanitsa (village) of Starocherkasskaya (literally Old-Cherkassk). Now it is a site of an important museum, tourist center and orthodox male convent. Michail Aleksandrovich Sholokhov was a major contributor to the museum's organization.

== Historical and cultural points of interest ==
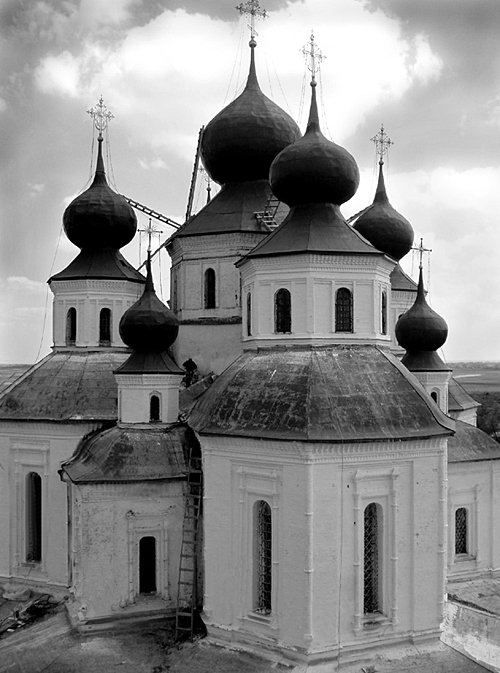
Resurrection cathedral

- Resurrection cathedral and iconostasis; location of the chains which are said to have held Stepan Razin
- Transfiguration (Preobrazhensky) Church (1740)
- Petropavlovsk Church (1751)
- The Ataman estate museum (Атаманское подворье)
- The house of Kondraty Bulavin
- The Annensky fortress ruins (1730)
- Our Lady of the Don monastery
