= Monument to a water supply system =

- Памятник водопроводу
- Interactive map of Monument to a water supply system
- Location: Rostov-on-Don, Pokrovsky Square
- Coordinates: 47°13′31″N 39°43′52″E
- Material: bronze
- Height: 2,2 meters

The Monument to a water supply system (Russian: Памятник водопроводу) is a bronze monument which was open in Pokrovsky Square of Rostov-on-Don opposite to city Musical theater.

== Description ==
As a material for the production of a monumental bronze was chosen. A height of a monument reaches 2,2 meters. On plans of authors, the monument is made in the form of the woman who is dressed as the resident of the 19th century. It gathers water in a bucket from a water column. Such symbol was chosen not accidentally — at that time, according to established orders, the woman was responsible for providing a family with drinking water, therefore, emergence in the city of a water supply system significantly facilitated household tasks of women. The monument was made in honor of the first water supply system in the city which earned in 1865. The Rostov water utility initiated the creation of a monument. The sculptor Sergey Oleshnya became one of the authors of a monument.
