= Starocherkassk Cathedral =

Cathedral in Starocherkasskaya, Russia

Coordinates: 47.2369°N 40.0432°E

Resurrection Cathedral
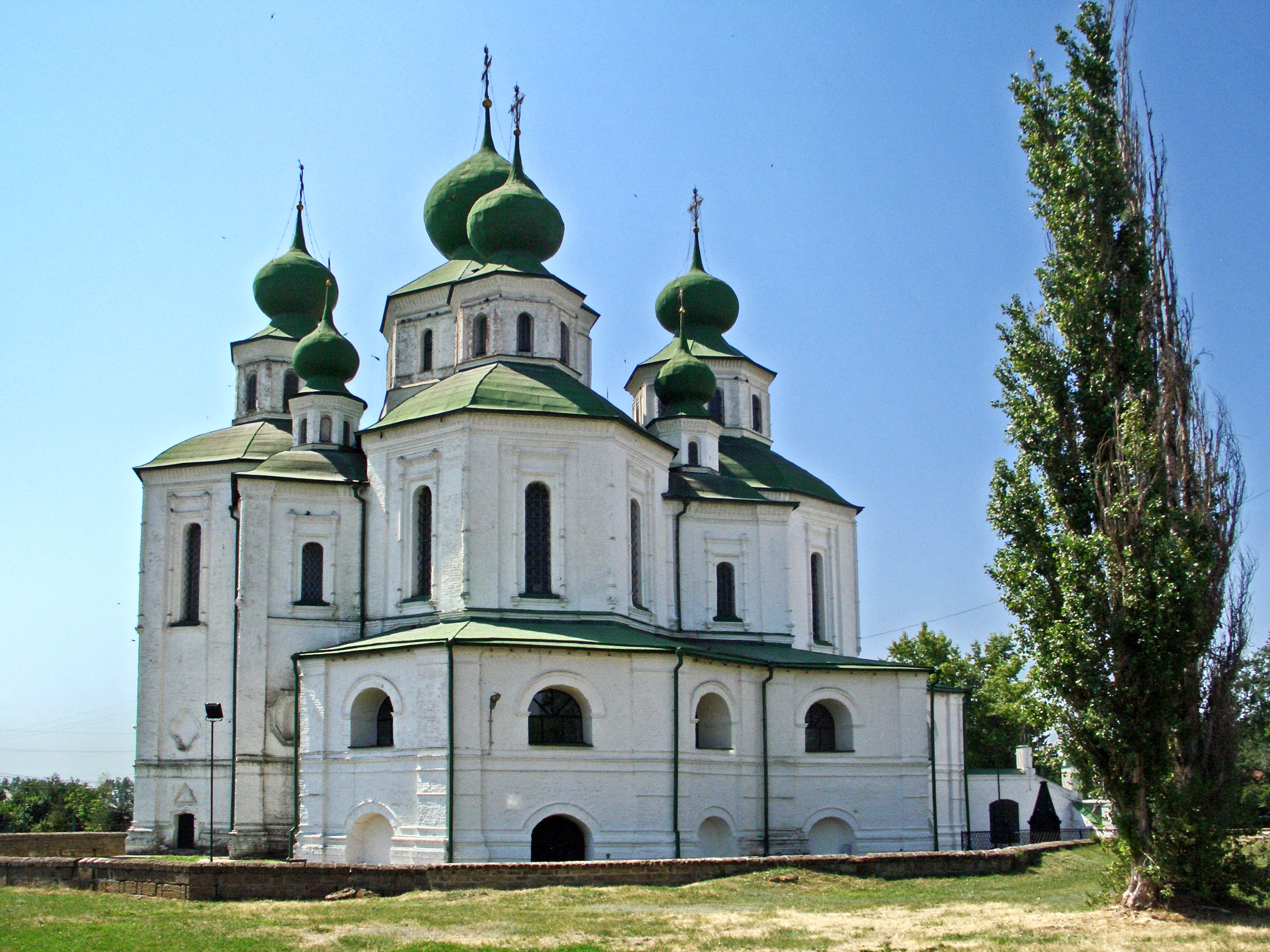

Religion
- Affiliation: Russian Orthodox

Location
- Location: Starocherkasskaya, Russia
- Interactive map of Resurrection Cathedral

Architecture
- Completed: 1719

The Military Cathedral of Christ's Resurrection (Russian: Воскресенский войсковой собор) was built between 1706 and 1719 as the first stone church in the Lower Don region. It was the main Christian shrine of the Don Cossack Host in the 18th century. It is situated in the stanitsa of Starocherkasskaya (the former city of Cherkassk), Rostov Oblast, Russia.

== History ==
In 1650, during the siege of Azov, the defending Cossacks vowed to build a wooden cathedral on the square where the cossack leaders held assemblies. Because of frequent fires in Cherkassk (the former name of the town), the cathedral burned twice.

The stone cathedral had been being built from 1706 to 1719. It was constructed in contrary with Peter I's decree banning the construction of stone buildings anywhere except for St. Petersburg. However, in view of political necessity, Peter himself contributed to construction works, helping with money and gifting utensils, and is said to have personally taken a symbolic part in the process of construction, putting a few bricks on the plaster (this fact is stated on the commemorative inscription made, however, already in the 19th century). It is also believed that the main construction works were carried out by architects from Moscow, who were specially sent by the Tsar.

== Description ==
Resurrection Cathedral has a height of 49 metres. It was built in the Cossack Baroque style by an unknown architect.

Near the entrance to the cathedral one can see walled massive chains, in which was allegedly chained Stepan Razin before he had been sent to be executed. Close to the chains, in the gallery, there is also kept ashes of Ataman Kirill Yakovlev.

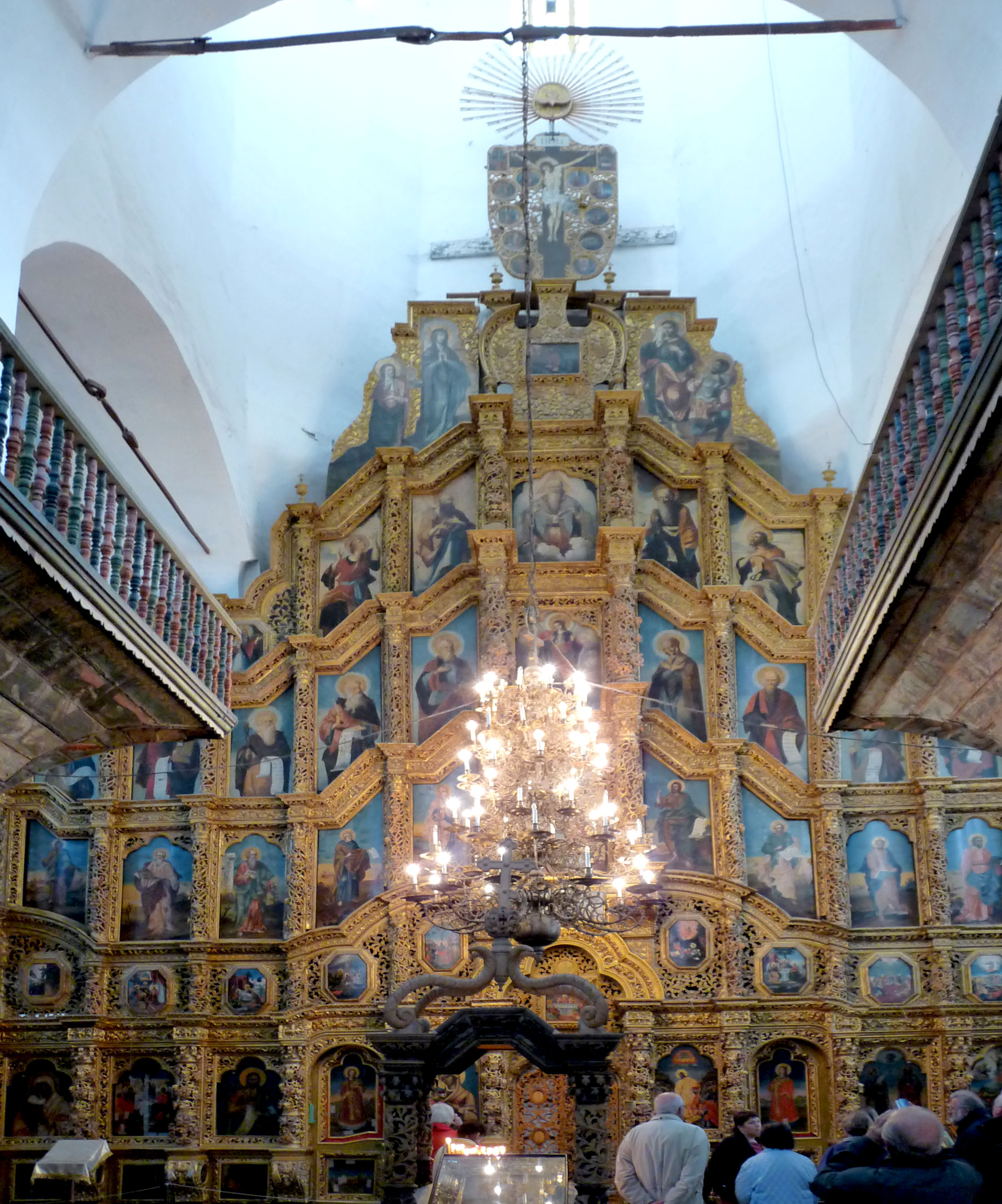
Baroque iconostasis

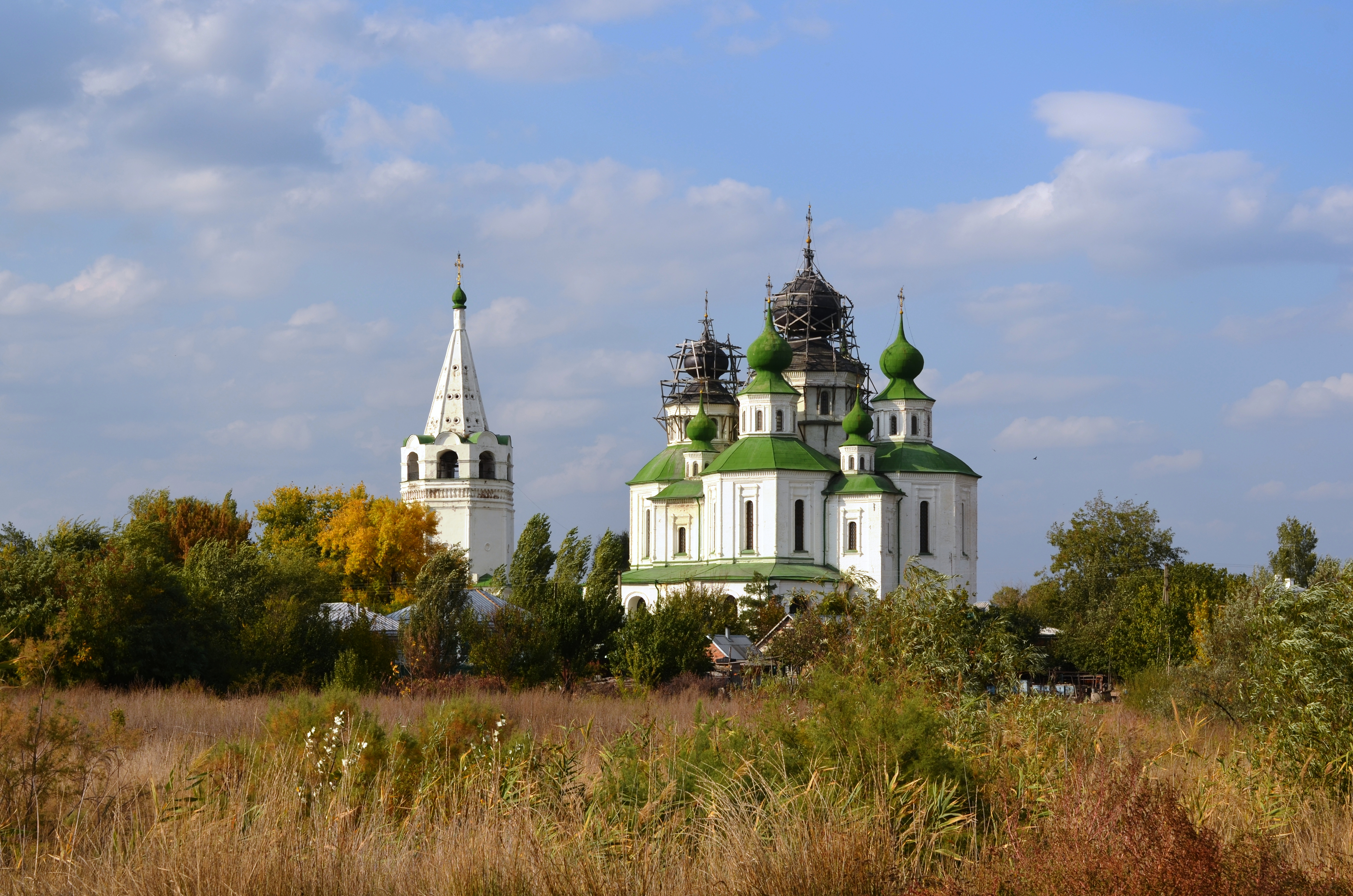
General view of the cathedral compound

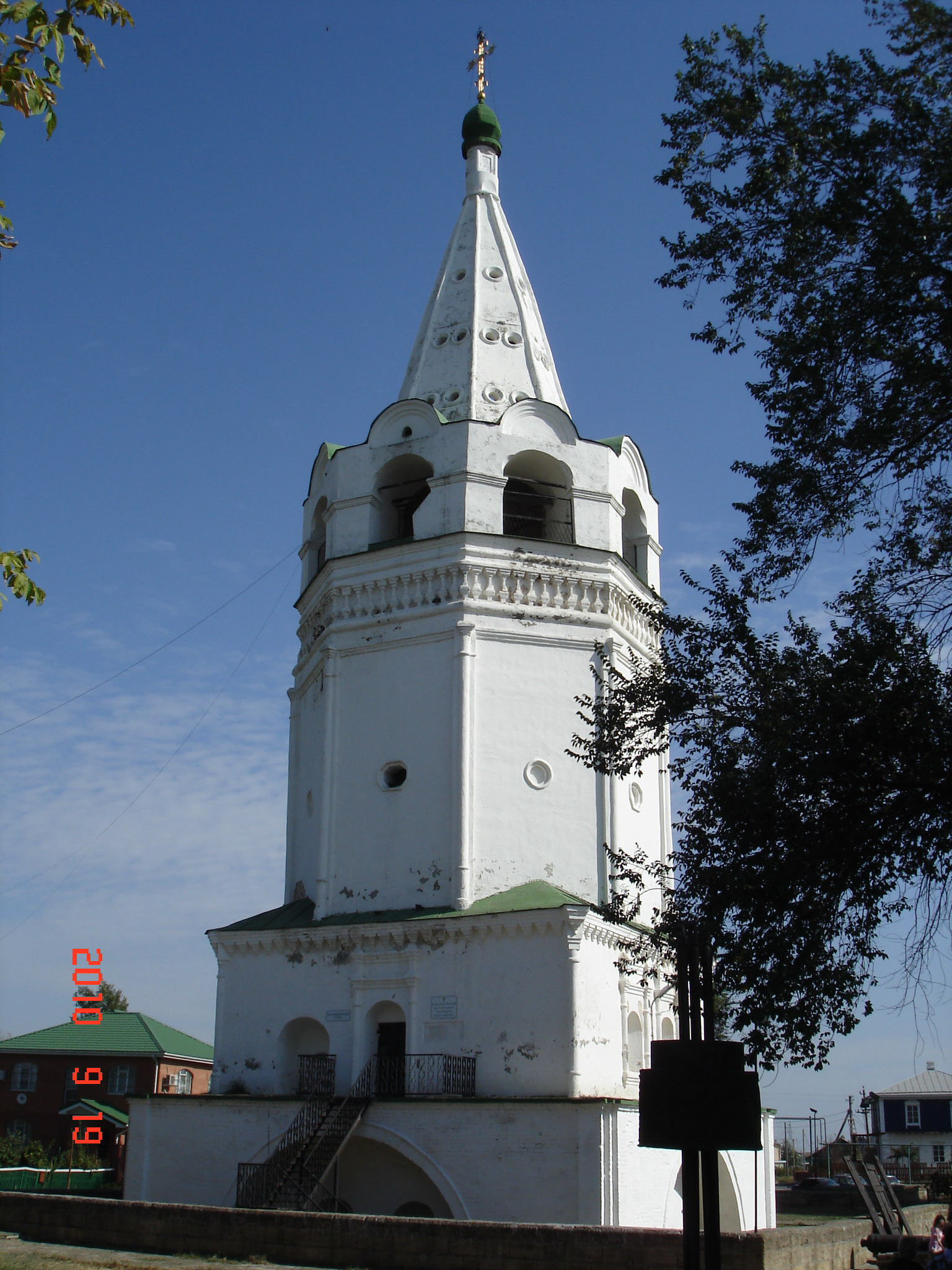
Separately standing bell tower is traditional for Russian architecture of the 17th century.

== Sources ==
- Шадрина А. В. Когда Старочеркасский воскресенский храм стал собором // Донской временник. Год 2016-й / Дон. гос. публ. б-ка. Ростов-на-Дону, 2015. Вып. 24. С. 98–101.
- Кирьянова С. А. Иконописец Егор Грек и иконостас Воскресенского собора Старочеркасска // Донской временник. Год 2016-й / Дон. гос. публ. б-ка. Ростов-на-Дону, 2015. Вып. 24. С. 102–106.
