= Aksaysky District =

Aksaysky District Аксайский район (Russian)
- District
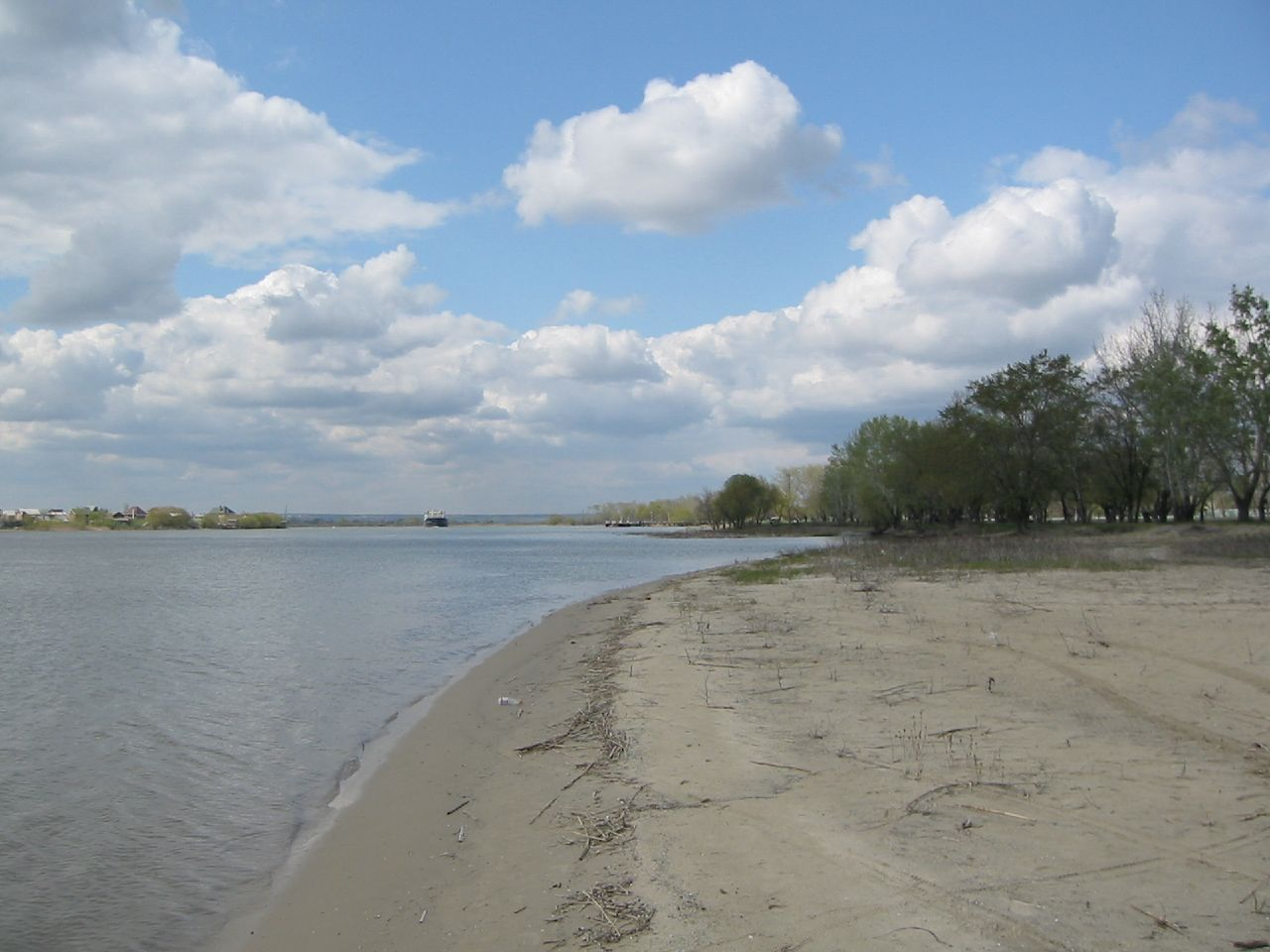
- The Don River near the stanitsa of Starocherkasskaya in Aksaysky District

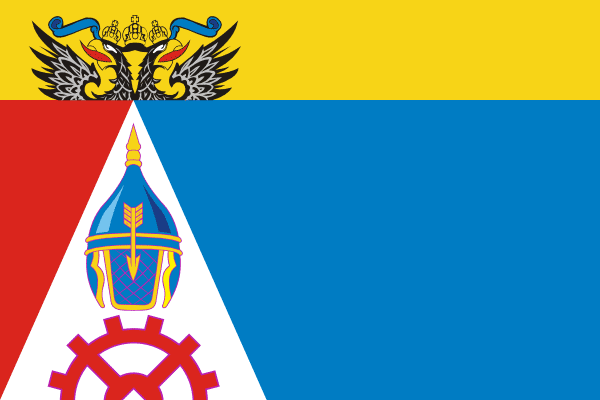
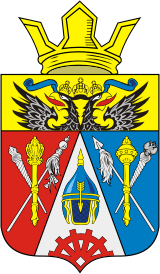
- Flag Coat of arms
- Location of Aksaysky District in Rostov Oblast
- Coordinates: 47°16′N 39°52′E
- Country: Russia
- Federal subject: Rostov Oblast
- Established: 1936
- Administrative center: Aksay

Area
  - Total: 1,162 km^{2} (449 sq mi)

Population (2010 Census)
  - Total: 102,369
  - Density: 88.10/km^{2} (228.2/sq mi)
  - Urban: 41.0%
  - Rural: 59.0%

Administrative structure
  - Administrative divisions: 1 Urban settlements, 10 Rural settlements
  - Inhabited localities: 1 cities/towns, 51 rural localities

Municipal structure
  - Municipally incorporated as: Aksaysky Municipal District
  - Municipal divisions: 1 urban settlements, 10 rural settlements
- Time zone: UTC+3 (MSK)
- OKTMO ID: 60602000
- Website: http://www.aksayland.ru/

Aksaysky District, or Aksay Region (Russian: Акса́йский райо́н) is an administrative and municipal district (raion), one of the 43 in Rostov Oblast, Russia. It is located in the western central part of the oblast. The area of the district is 1,162 square kilometers (449 sq mi). Its administrative center is the town of Aksay. Population: 102,369 (2010 Census); 88,899 (2002 census); 73,361 (1989 Soviet census). The population of Aksay accounts for 41.0% of the district's total population.

== Geography ==
- Shishlovsky Island

== Economy ==
=== Transportation ===
Platov International Airport, which will serve Rostov-on-Don, located at the stanitsa of Grushevskaya, which has commenced all services on 7 December 2017.
