= Aksay, Rostov Oblast =

Town in Rostov Oblast, Russia

Aksay Аксай
- Town
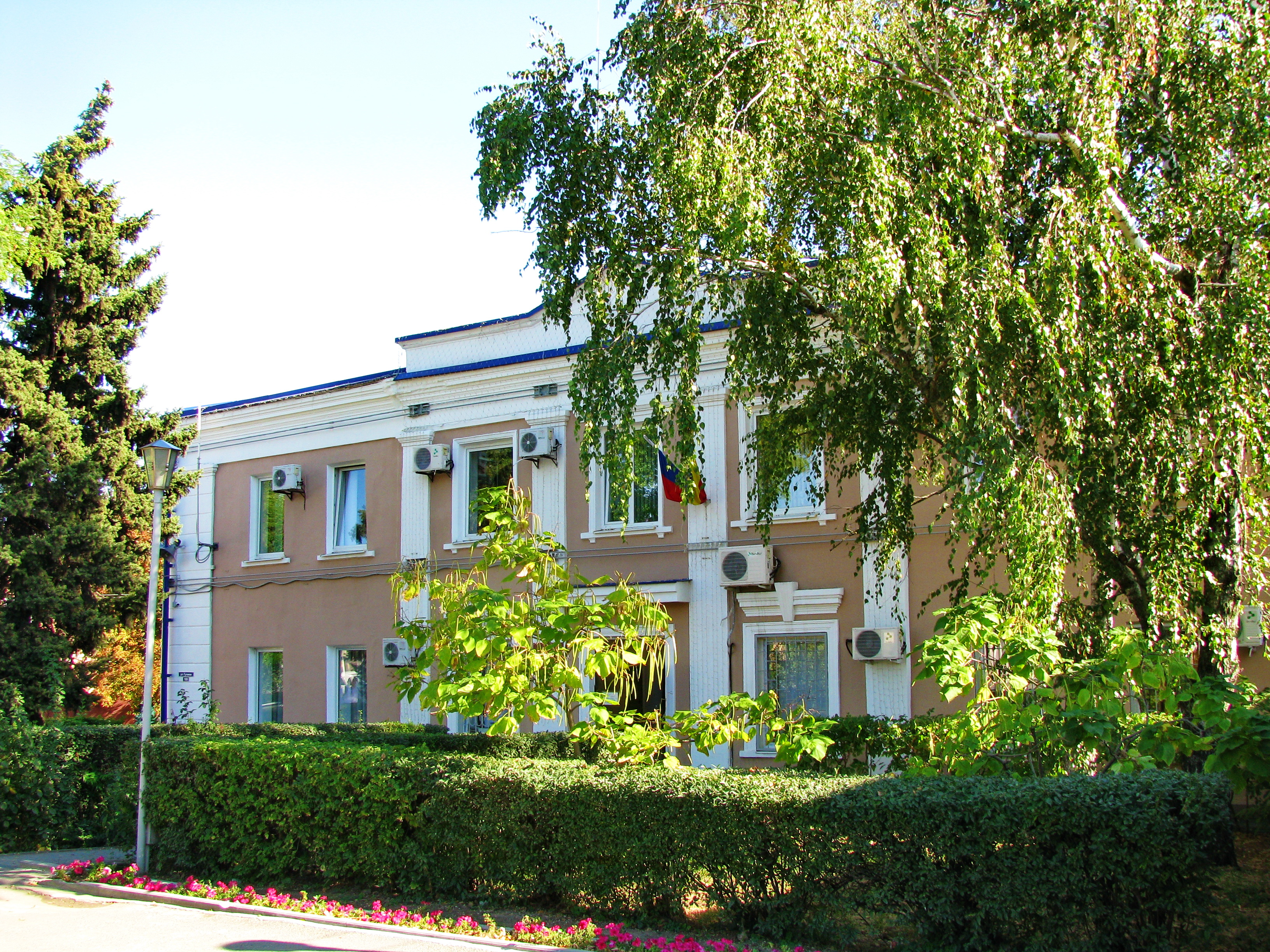

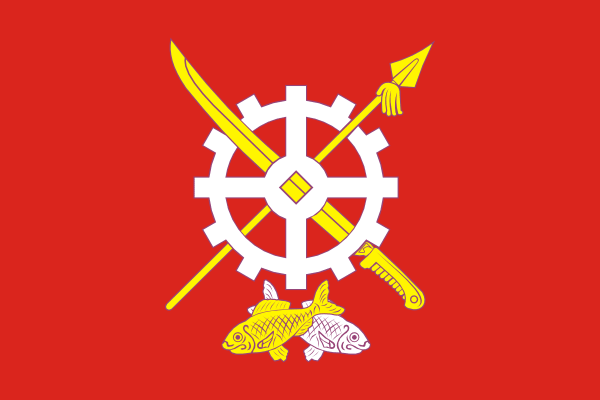
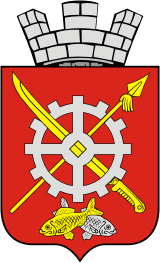
- Flag Coat of arms
- Interactive map of Aksay
- Location of Aksay Aksay (Rostov Oblast)
- Coordinates: 47°15′N 39°52′E
- Country: Russia
- Federal subject: Rostov Oblast
- Administrative district: Aksaysky District
- Urban settlementSelsoviet: Aksayskoye
- First mentioned: 1569
- Town status since: 1957
- Elevation: 80 m (260 ft)

Population (2010 Census)
  - Total: 41,969
  - Estimate (2021): 48,372 (+15.3%)

Administrative status
  - Capital of: Aksaysky District, Aksayskoye Urban Settlement

Municipal status
  - Municipal district: Aksaysky Municipal District
  - Urban settlement: Aksayskoye Urban Settlement
  - Capital of: Aksaysky Municipal District, Aksayskoye Urban Settlement
- Time zone: UTC+3 (MSK)
- Postal codes: 346720, 346721, 346723, 346724, 346739
- OKTMO ID: 60602101001
- Website: www.gorod-aksay.ru

Aksay (Russian: Аксай) is a town and the administrative center of Aksaysky District in Rostov Oblast, Russia, located on the right bank of the Don River, 18 kilometers (11 mi) northeast of Rostov-on-Don, the administrative center of the oblast. Population: 41,969 (2010 census); 38,012 (2002 census); 33,389 (1989 Soviet census). It was previously known as Ust-Aksayskaya (until 1791), Aksayskaya (until 1957).

== History ==
It was first mentioned in 1569 as a Cossack settlement. Until 1791, it was known as Ust-Aksayskaya (Усть-Акса́йская). From 1791, it was known as the stanitsa of Aksayskaya (Акса́йская). In November 21–29, 1941, Aksayskaya was occupied by German troops. In 1957, it was granted town status and renamed Aksay.

== Administrative and municipal status ==
Within the framework of administrative divisions, Aksay serves as the administrative center of Aksaysky District. As an administrative division, it is incorporated within Aksaysky District as Aksayskoye Urban Settlement. As a municipal division, this administrative unit also has urban settlement status and is a part of Aksaysky Municipal District.

== Economy ==
Aksay serves as an industrial satellite of Rostov-on-Don.

== Attractions ==
There are many monuments and museums in Aksay. Among them:

- Museum complex "Customs Outpost of the 18th century". The Museum contains exhibits of everyday life of customs officers, weapons, maps, ancient manuscripts.
- "Military-historical complex named Gulaeva". The Museum is on the site "Mukhina Balka". The Museum has collected Soviet and Russian military equipment. Underground facility — command post of the North Caucasus district.
- The Museum "Postal station of 19th century." Stayed here Griboyedov, Lermontov, Rajewski, Pushkin, Tolstoy, Tchaikovsky, Rosene etc.
- The memorial complex "Crossing". Built in memory of the soldiers who fell here during the great Patriotic war.
- Kobyakovo hillfort settlements with the remnants of the Sarmatians, Polovtsy, Tatars and Rus.
- Aksay military history Museum. The Museum contains military equipment of the early 20th century: rockets, cars, guns, planes, tanks, military boats and more.
- The Strength Of Aksai. The fortress of the 18th century is a monument of military architecture, part Iskauskas military-historical Museum. Earthen fortress in 1763 was part of the Rostov fortress of Dmitry of Rostov.
- The temple in honor of icon of Mother of God "Hodegetria" (19th century).
- Assumption Church (1825). Built in Empire style by the architect M. A. Abrosimova.
- Military-historical Museum of the mid-twentieth century "House of Suvorov". The Museum's seven buildings. Alexander Suvorov spent the winter of 1783-1784.
- Nature reserve "Golden hills" in the floodplain of the don river.
- The monument twice hero of the Soviet Union N. D. Gulaev — the monument of regional significance.
- Aksay dungeons.
- The Monument to Vladimir Lenin.
- Aksay Post House.

== Gallery ==
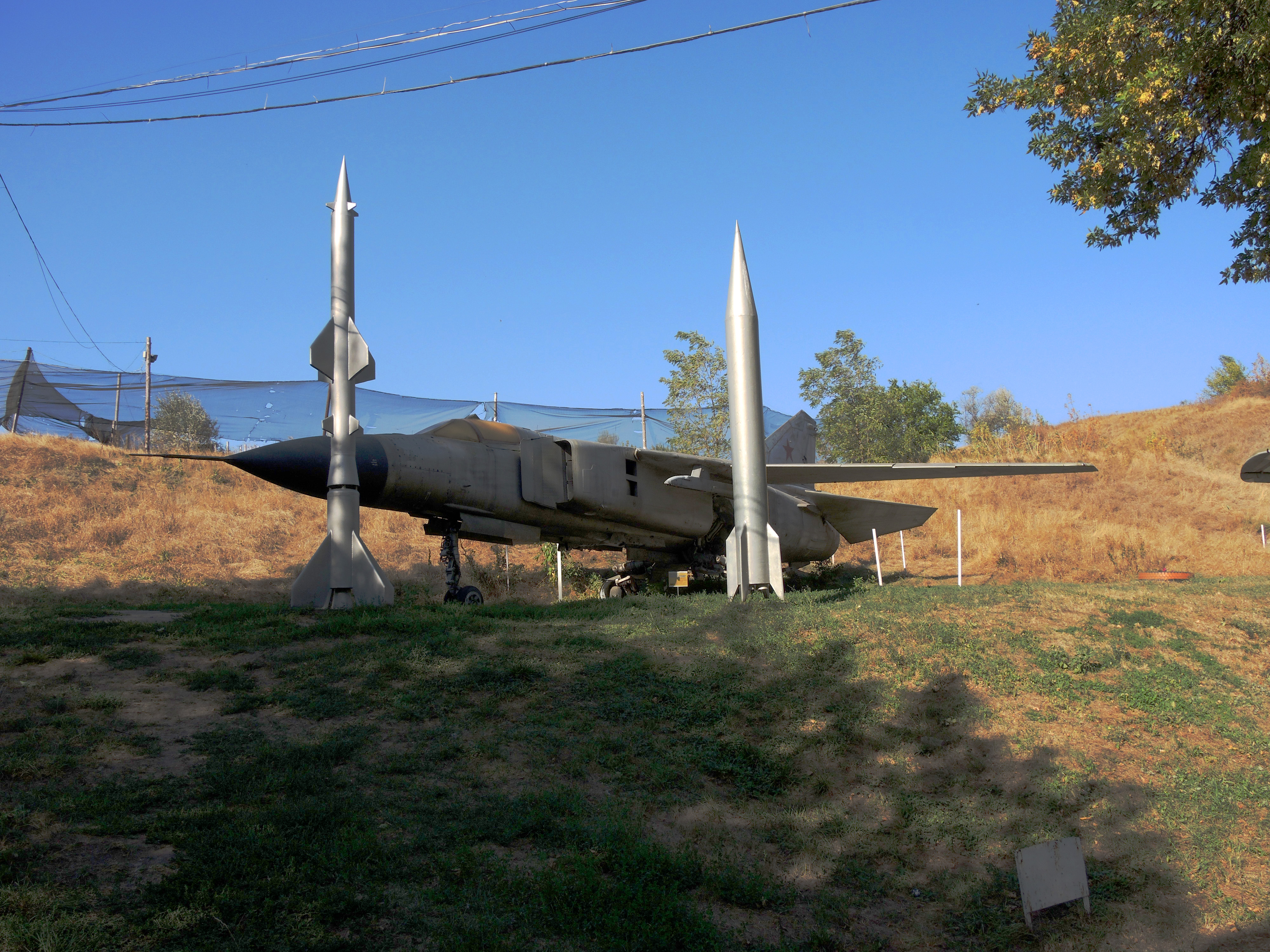
Museum of military equipment

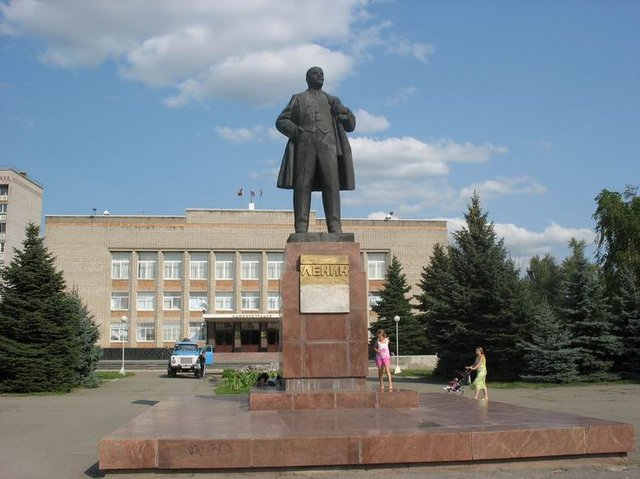
The Monument to Lenin

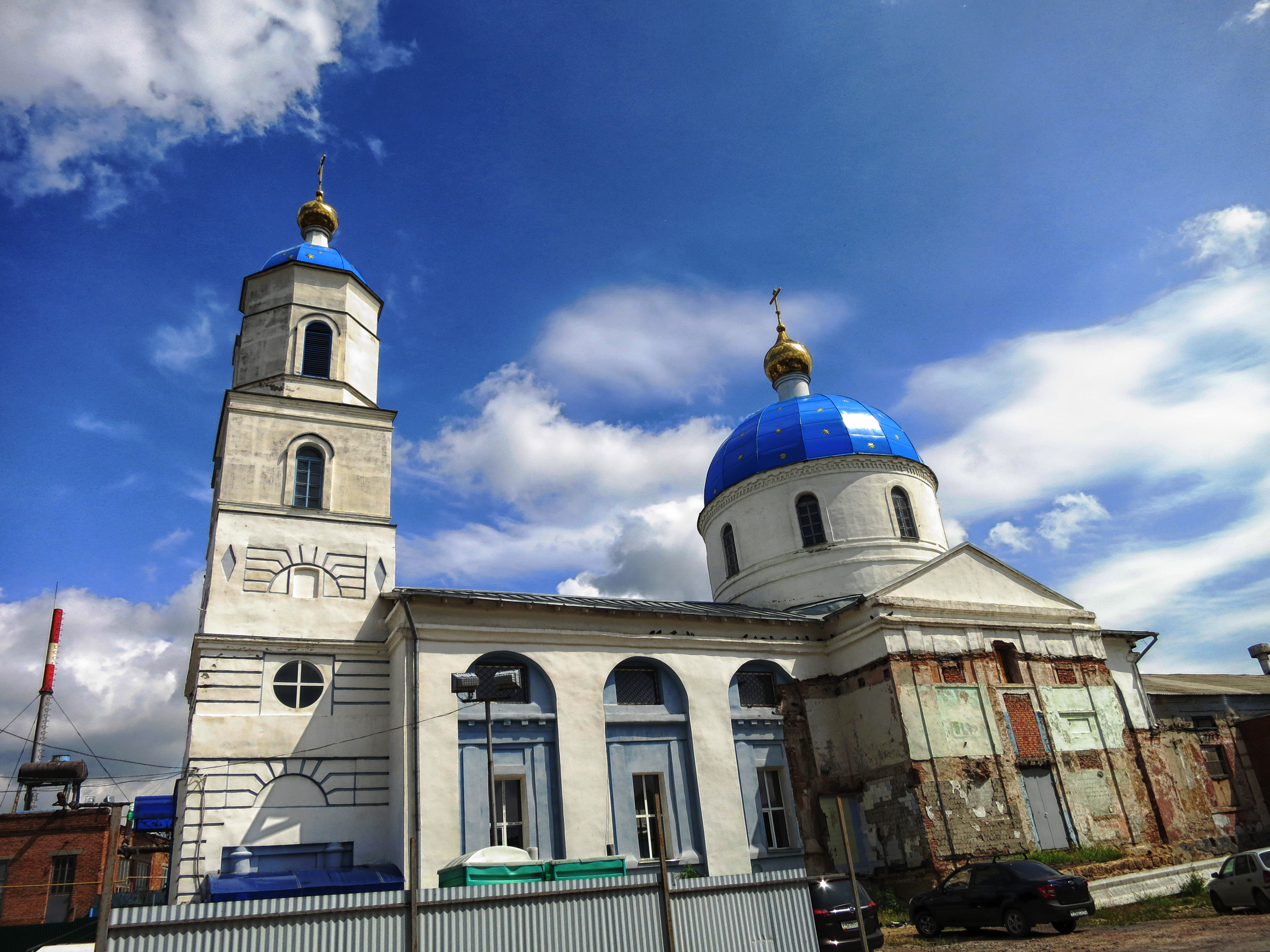
Dormition Cathedral

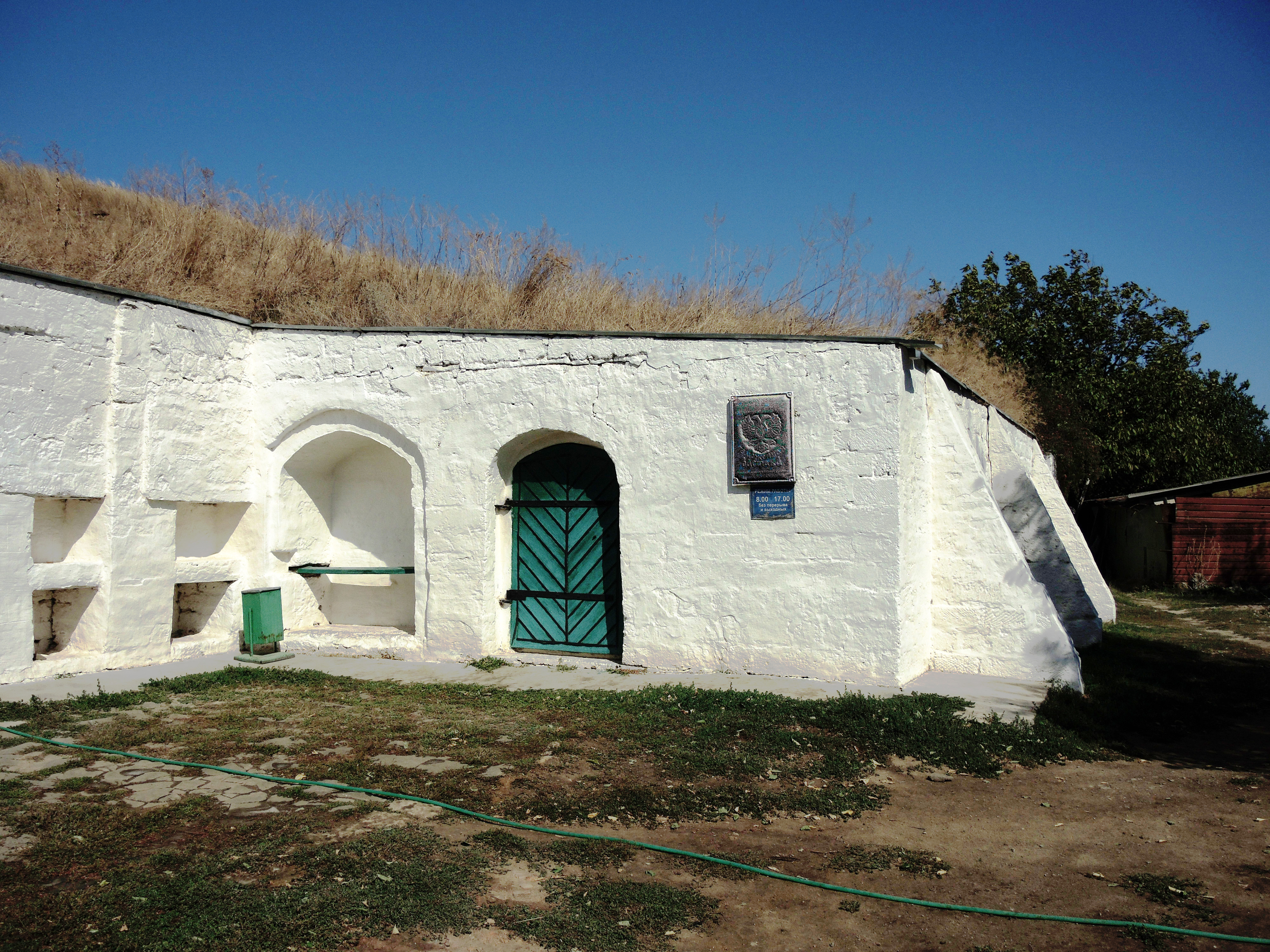
Customs gate

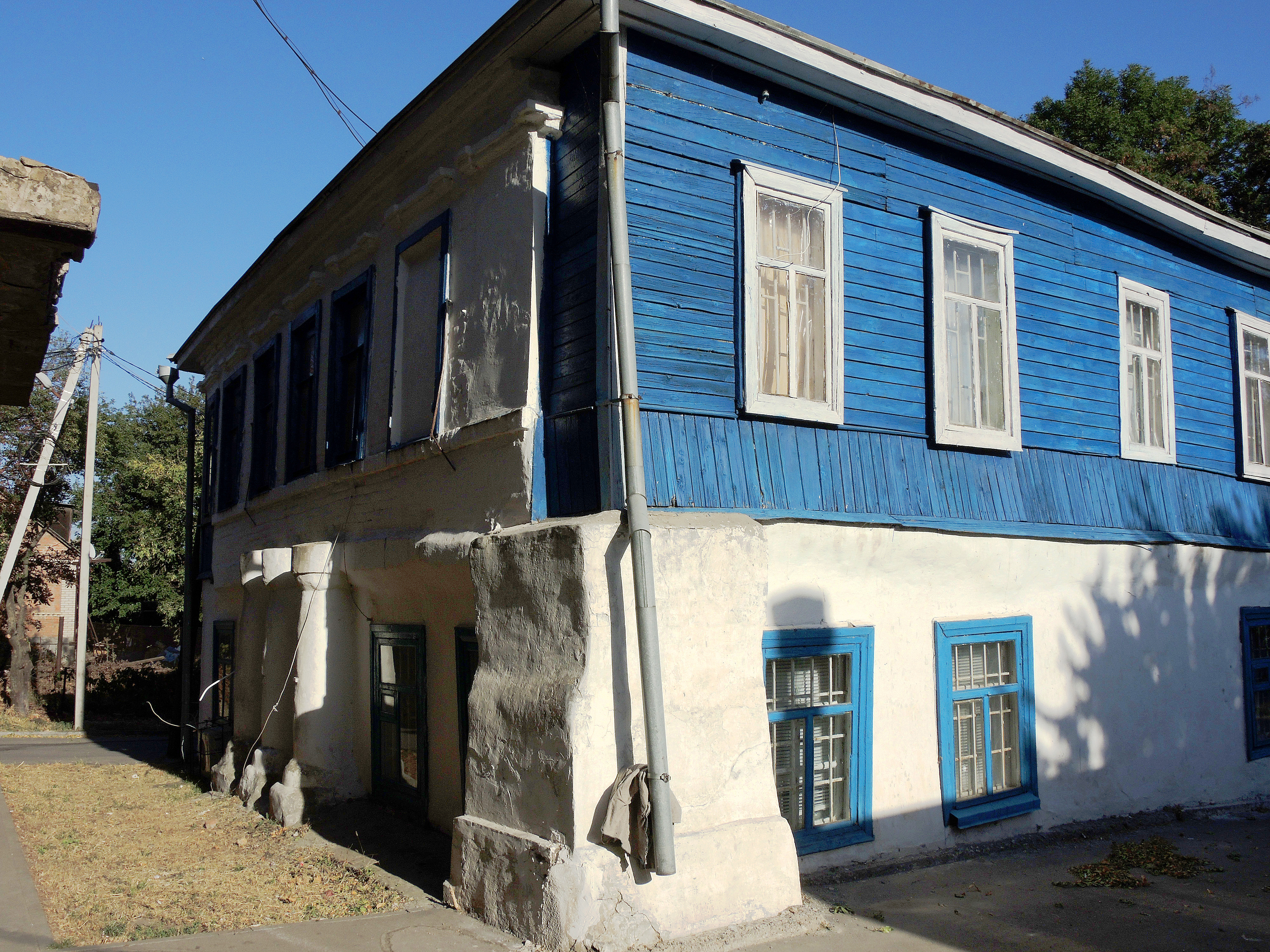
"House of Suvorov"
