= List of Don Cossacks noble families =

Noble families of Don Cossacks in alphabetical order includes the old original Cossack noble families from Free Don, families which titles were granted by the Tsars of Moskovia and Russian Imperators after including of the territories of Free Don in to Russian Imperium. Most of the origin Don Cossacks families were a landowners that provoked Russian peasants to escape to Don and work on their lands, like General Atamans of the Efremov family. Free territories of Don Cossacks known from the beginning of 14th century until the end of the 16th century when Moscow gained control of them.

| Name of the family | Time span | Titles | Notes | Coat of arms |
|---|---|---|---|---|
| Denisov family | 17th – today | Count (since 1799) | Noble family of Don Cossacks origin, Fedor Petrovich Denisov (1738 — 1803), General of Cavalry, was a first Earl of the Don Cossacks. | |
| Orlov-Denisov family | 18th – 20th century | Count (since 1801) | Noble family of Don Cossacks origin, Vasily Orlov-Denisov, grandson (on his mother's side) of the first Earl of the Cossacks, General of Cavalry, Fedor Petrovich Denisov. Count of the Russian Empire in 1801. Shikhany manor was passed from the wife of Vasily Orlov-Denisov baroness Maria Vassilieva (1784—1829). | |
| Platov family | 18th – 20th century | Count (since 1812) | Noble family of Don Cossacks origin, ataman Matvei Platov (1751–1818) founded Novocherkassk. Count of the Russian Empire in 1812. He was awarded an honorary degree of low by the University of Oxford (1814). | |
| Grabbe family | 18th – today | Count (since 1866) | Don Cossacks noble family of a Finnish nobility origin. Paul Hrisztoforovicz Graf Grabbe (1789—1875) was a Russian Full General of Cavalry in time of Napoleonic Wars. | |
| Golubintzev family | 18th – today | | Noble family of Don Cossacks origin. Alexander V. Golubintzev (1882 - 1963) was a Don Army Major General in time of Russian Civil War. | |
| Baklanov family | 17th – today | | Noble family of Don Cossacks origin, the earliest reference dates back to 1670, with Ingnaz Baklanov being the oldest of known ancestors. The most famous member of the family is Jacov Petrovich Baklanov (1809—1873) who was a Cossack Lieutenant General, one of the Russian commanders in time of Caucasian War. | |
| Bogaewsky family | 17th – today | | Noble family of Don Cossacks origin from stanitsa Kamenskaya. The most famous member of the family is Afrikan Petrovich Bogaewsky (1872—1934), who was a Lieutenant General of Russian Imperial Army and Don Host Ataman. | |
| Chernozubov family | 18th – today | | Noble family of Don Cossacks origin. Ilia Chernozubov (1765—1821), was a Russian General in time of Napoleonic Wars. Theodore G. Chernozubov (14 September 1863 – 14 November 1919) was a Russian Imperial Army Lieutenant General. He was trained at Pazheskom corps and later Imperial General Staff Academy in 1889. He was the head of the cavalry training of Persian Cossack Brigade (1902 - 1906). | |
| Efremov family | 17th – today | | Efremov, (sometimes transliterated as Yefremov). Noble family of Don Cossacks origin, the earliest reference dates back to 1670, with Efrem son Petrov being the oldest of known ancestors. | |
| Ilovaiski family | 17th – today | | Noble family of Don Cossacks origin, Makij Ilovaiski founded Makiivka at the end of 17th century and this property was named after its owner. This family owned a lot of lands and properties in Don Voisko. Twelve of the Ilovski family join the Napoleonic wars, and the most famous member of the family was Alexei Ilovaiski (1767 — 1842), a Russian General and Don Cossacks Ataman (1823 - 1827). | |
| Krasnov family | 18th – today | | Noble family of Don Cossacks origin, the most famous members of the family are Ivan Kuzmich Krasnov, Ivan Krasnov, Nikolay Krasnov and Pyotr Krasnov. | |
| Kaledin family | 18th – today | | Don Cossacks origin, the most famous member of the family Alexey Kaledin (1861–1918) was a Russian Full General of Cavalry who led the Don Cossack White movement in the opening stages of the Russian Civil War. | |
| Khanzhonkov/Hanschonkoff family | 15th – today | | Noble family of historical Turkic peoples origin, Cercetae. The family name can be traced back to an patronymic with Khan (title), based on the given name of a descendant of one of the potentates of the nomadic tribes out from Pontic–Caspian steppe. The earliest reference dates by Don Cossacks back to 1670, with Ataman Iwan Jakovlevic Khanzhonkov/Hanschonkoff. The most famous member of the family is Alexander Khanzhonkov, a Russia's first cinema entrepreneur. | |
| Krawtzoff family | 18th – today | | Kravtzov, (sometimes transliterated as Krawtzow). Don Cossacks noble family of a Polish origin from Pomerania. Owners of the Ragozina Balka property near Antratsyt in the steppe. Petr Kravtzov, (1861—1919) was a Russian General during the First World War and Don Cossack White movement General in the opening stages of Russian Civil War. He was killed by Bolsheviks in Battle for Tsaritsyn. Anton Chekhov was his teacher and friend of him and his father. | |
| Kutejnikov family | 18th – today | | Noble family of Don Cossacks origin, the most famous member of the family Dmitri Kutejnikov (1766 — 1844) was a Russian Full General in time of Napoleonic Wars. | |
| Melnikov family | 17th – today | | Noble family of Don Cossacks origin. | |
| Martynov family | 15th – today | | Don Cossacks noble family of a Polish origin. Pavel Martynov (1782—1838) was a General-Adjutant of the Emperor of Russia Nicholas I. | |
| Pisarev family | 18th – today | | Noble family of Don Cossacks origin, the most famous member of the family Petr Pisarev (1874 — 1967) was a Russian General during the First World War and White movement Lieutenant General in the Russian Civil War. Commandant of the garrison of Tsaritsyn in 1919 and of Sevastopol in 1920. | |
| Rykowski family | 18th – today | | Rykovski, (sometimes transliterated as Rykovskov). Don Cossacks noble family of a Polish origin. Landowners and owners of Rykovski Mines in Yuzovka. Colonel Petr Rykovskov commander of the 14th Regiment of Don Cossacks. | |
| Tschebotarioff family | 18th – today | | Noble family of Don Cossacks origin. Gregory P. Tschebotarioff (1899 - 1985) was a full professor of civil engineering at Princeton University. His father Porphyry G. Tschebotarioff was a Lieutenant General of Don Republic in the Russian Civil War. | |
| Turchaninov family | 18th – today | | Turchaninov, (sometimes transliterated as Turchin). Noble family of Don Cossacks origin, the most famous member of the family Ivan Turchaninov (1821–1901) known as John Basil Turchin, was a Union army brigadier general in the American Civil War. | |
| Venevitinov family | 17th – today | | Noble family of Don Cossacks origin, the earliest reference dates back to 1622, with Tereh from Venyov being the oldest of known ancestors. The most famous member of the family Dmitry Venevitinov (1805 - 1827), was a minor Russian Romantic poet. | |
| Varvakis family | 18th – today | | Varvakis, (sometimes transliterated as Varvatsi). The most famous member of the family was Ioannis Varvakis (1745-1825) of a Greek origin. | |

== See also ==
- List of Russian commanders in the Patriotic War of 1812
- Military Gallery of the Winter Palace
- Russian nobility
- Don Cossacks
