= First Cadet Corps =

Military School

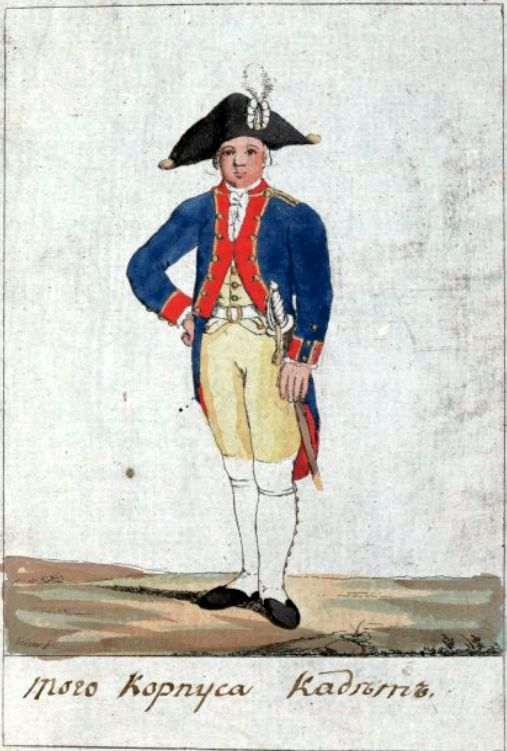
Cadet uniform of the Land Gentry Cadet Corps (1793)

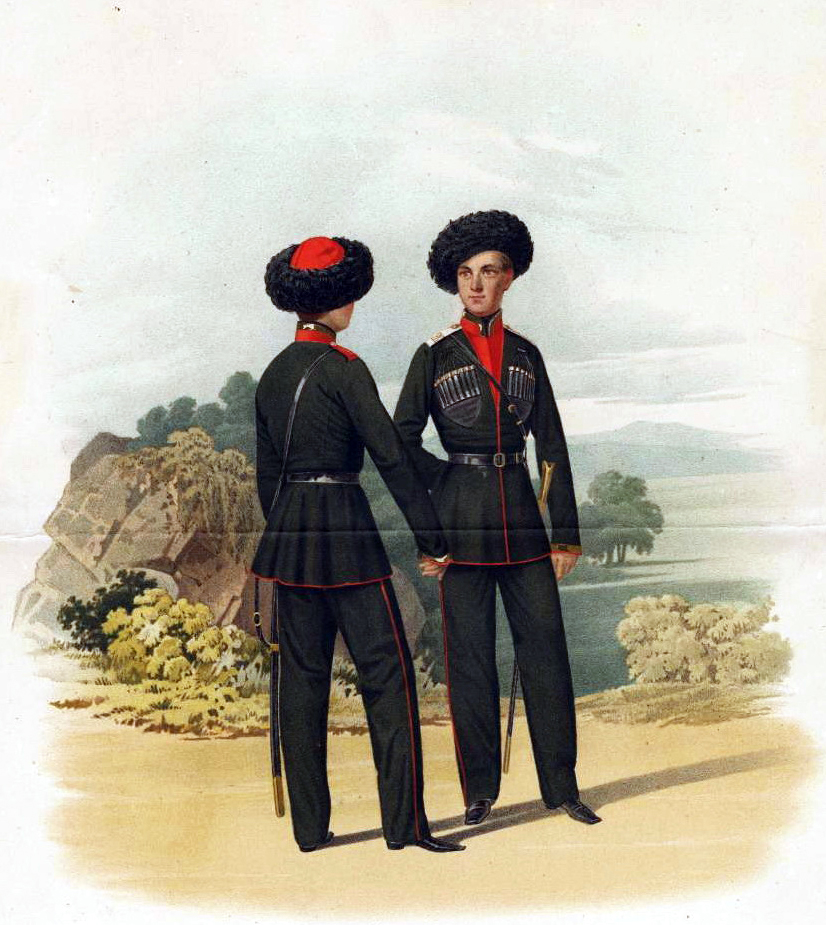
Karl Piratsky. Pupils from the mountaineers of the First and Second Cadet Corps. 1855

The First Cadet Corps was a military school in Saint Petersburg.

== History of creation ==
The initiative to create cadet corps for noblemen in Russia came from Count Pavel Yaguzhinsky. By the decree of Empress Anna Ioannovna of July 29, 1731, the Senate was ordered to establish a cadet corps. Menshikov Palace on Vasilyevsky Island was transferred to the placement of the school.

The opening took place on February 28, 1732; with 56 cadets. When in June the number of cadets was already 352, they were divided into three companies. The first graduation took place on June 8, 1734: all 11 graduates were promoted to ensigns.

The first teachers were accepted without any test; since 1736, the best students began to be involved in teaching.

== Education system ==
Initially, the corps was conceived for the training of the military, but due to the lack of educational institutions, it began to train civilian officials. This led to non-military disciplines being taught together with the military sciences: languages including German, French, and Latin, "oratorio" and other subjects. Teachers at school rarely explained the material, reducing learning to memorizing sections. This system changed in 1766, when Ivan Betskoy, who headed the corps, compiled the "Charter of the Land gentry Cadet Corps for the upbringing and training of the noble Russian youth". Instead of dividing the cadets into companies, a division into five ages was introduced. Only children of 5-6 years of age were accepted, whose training was to last 15 years. The youngest age was under female supervision, and starting from the 4th age, pupils shared, "at will or by inclination", to prepare for military or civil services. Each age was divided into five sections. In these departments, both noble children and gymnasium students (children of commoners) studied together. High school students studied on an equal footing with the Cadets. In the corpus, theatrical art, dance, music were studied, while military disciplines were not among the priority ones. As a result, a situation emerged that Semyon Vorontsov estimated as follows:

The officers who left the old cadet corps were only good military men; those brought up by Betskoy, played comedies, wrote poems, they knew, in short, everything except what the officer should have known.

A fundamental change occurred in 1794, when the corps was headed by Mikhail Kutuzov, who reorganized according to the instructions of Emperor Paul I. Instead of five age groups, four musketeer and one grenadier company were introduced. All civilian teachers were replaced by military officers. Tactics and military history classes were introduced, for officers as well as cadets.

=== Names ===
- from 1732 to 1743 – Knight Academy;
- from 1743 to 1766 – Land cadet corps;
- from 1766 to 1800 – the Imperial land gentry cadet corps;
- from 1800 to 1863 – First Saint Petersburg Cadet Corps;
- from 1864 to 1882 – the First Saint Petersburg Military Gymnasium;
- from 1882 – First Saint Petersburg Cadet Corps;
- from February 1917 until its dissolution in January 1918 – the First High School of the military department.

=== Chief Directors (General Directors) ===
- Count Burkhard Christoph von Münnich (December 29, 1731 – March 3, 1741) (Minich was the Chief Director of the corps; the directors were consistent with him: very briefly – Baron Luberas von Pott and Baron von Münnich (Burkhard Münnich's cousin); then – von Tetau);
- Prince Anthony Ulrich of Brunswick (March 27, 1741 – November 25, 1741);
- Prince Ludwig Wilhelm of Hesse-Homburg (December 11, 1741 – August 26, 1745);
- Prince Vasily Anikitich Repnin (August 26, 1745 – August 01, 1748);
- Prince Boris Grigoryevich Yusupov (February 19, 1750 – February 12, 1759);
- Grand Duke Peter Fedorovich (February 12, 1759 – March 14, 1762);
- Ivan Shuvalov (March 14, 1762 – 1767);
- Jacob Larionovich Brandt (1767 – 1772);
- Chevalier Konstantin Alexandrovich de Lascari (1772 – 1773);
- Andrey Yakovlevich Purpur (1773 – 1784);
- Count Anton Bogdanovich de Balmen (1784 – 1786);
- Count Fedor Astafyevich Anhalt (November 8, 1786 – May 22, 1794);
- Mikhail Kutuzov (1794 – 1797);
- Count Ivan Evstafevich Ferzen (December 24, 1797 – December 24, 1798);
- General Andreevsky (1798 – 1799);
- Lieutenant-General Matvey Ivanovich Lamzdorf (March 22, 1799 – April 12, 1800);
- The Most High Prince Platon Zubov (November 23, 1800 – 1801);
- Major General Fedor Ivanovich Klinger (since 1801);
- Ivan Ivanovich Dibich (since 1811);
- Peter Andreevich Kleinmichel (1817);
- Mikhail Stepanovich Persky (1820 – 1832);
- Pavel Petrovich Godein (1832 – 1843);
- Konstantin Antonovich Shlippenbach (1843 – 1847);
- Nikolai Pavlovich Gartong (1862 – 1864);
- Evgeny Karlovich Baumgarten (1864 – 1876);
- Pavel Ivanovich Nosovich (1877 – 1887);
- Vasily Parfenyevich Verkhovsky (1887 – January 15, 1900);
- Vasiliy Pokotilo (February 12, 1900 – December 11, 1904);
- Fedor Alekseevich Grigoriev (January 8, 1905 – 1917).

== Famous graduates ==
=== 18th century ===
1738 (114 graduates)

- Mikhail Sobakin

1740 (89 graduates)

- Alexander Sumarokov

1747 (135 graduates)

- Alexander Vyazemsky

1751 (144 graduates)

- Nikita Beketov
- Mikhail Kheraskov

1766 (296 graduates)

- Alexander Khrapovitsky

1782 (119 graduates)

- Alexey Bobrinsky
- Alexey Bolotnikov

1785 (92 graduates)

- Dmitry Buturlin
- Ivan Kulnev

1793 (122 graduates)

- Boris Aderkas
- Alexander Aledinsky
- Ivan Argamakov

1796 (84 graduates)

- Pyotr Poletika

1799 (66 graduates)

- Vasily Tizengauzen

=== 19th century and 20th century ===
1802 (114 graduates)

- Michael Braiko

1803 (50 graduates)

- Fyodor Glinka

1804 (24 graduates)

- Karl Merder

1806 (121 graduates)

- Thaddeus Bulgarin

1809 (64 graduates)

- Vasily Bebutov

1812 (180 graduates)

- Alexander Wrangel

1814 (122 graduates)

- Kondraty Ryleev

1815 (65 graduates)

- Edward Brummer

1816 (154 graduates)

- Mikhail Bez-Kornilovich
- Pavel Vitovtov

1817 (98 graduates)

- Alexander Vintulov

1818 (13 graduates)

- Andrei Rosen

1823 (131 graduates)

- Alexey Vedenyapin

1825 (128 graduates)

- Alexander Baggovut

1827 (99 graduates)

- Nikolay Baggovut

1828 (104 graduates)

- Karl Baggovut

1833

- Alexander Veymarn

1835

- Dmitry Kropotov

1839

- Gotgard Wrangell

1843

- Alexander Barsov

1848

- Balakishi Arablinsky

1849

- Alexander Gagemeister

1851

- Karl-Vladimir Arpsgofen
- Konstantin Bodisko

1855

- Konstantin Argamakov
- Alexander Vodar

1856

- Vladimir Bool

1858

- Alexander Balts
- Nikolay Bobrikov

1859

- Vasily Argamakov
- Georgy Bobrikov

1860

- Dmitry Bobylev

1871

- Nikita Batashev

1876

- Ivan Valberg

1884

- Evgeny Baumgarten

1885

- Vladimir Belyaev

1888

- Lev Baikov

1892

- Valerian Andreevsky
- Vsevolod Bunyakovsky

1893

- Vladimir Agapeev

1902

- Christopher Aue

1903

- Mikhail Arkhipov

== Features of the Cadet Corps ==
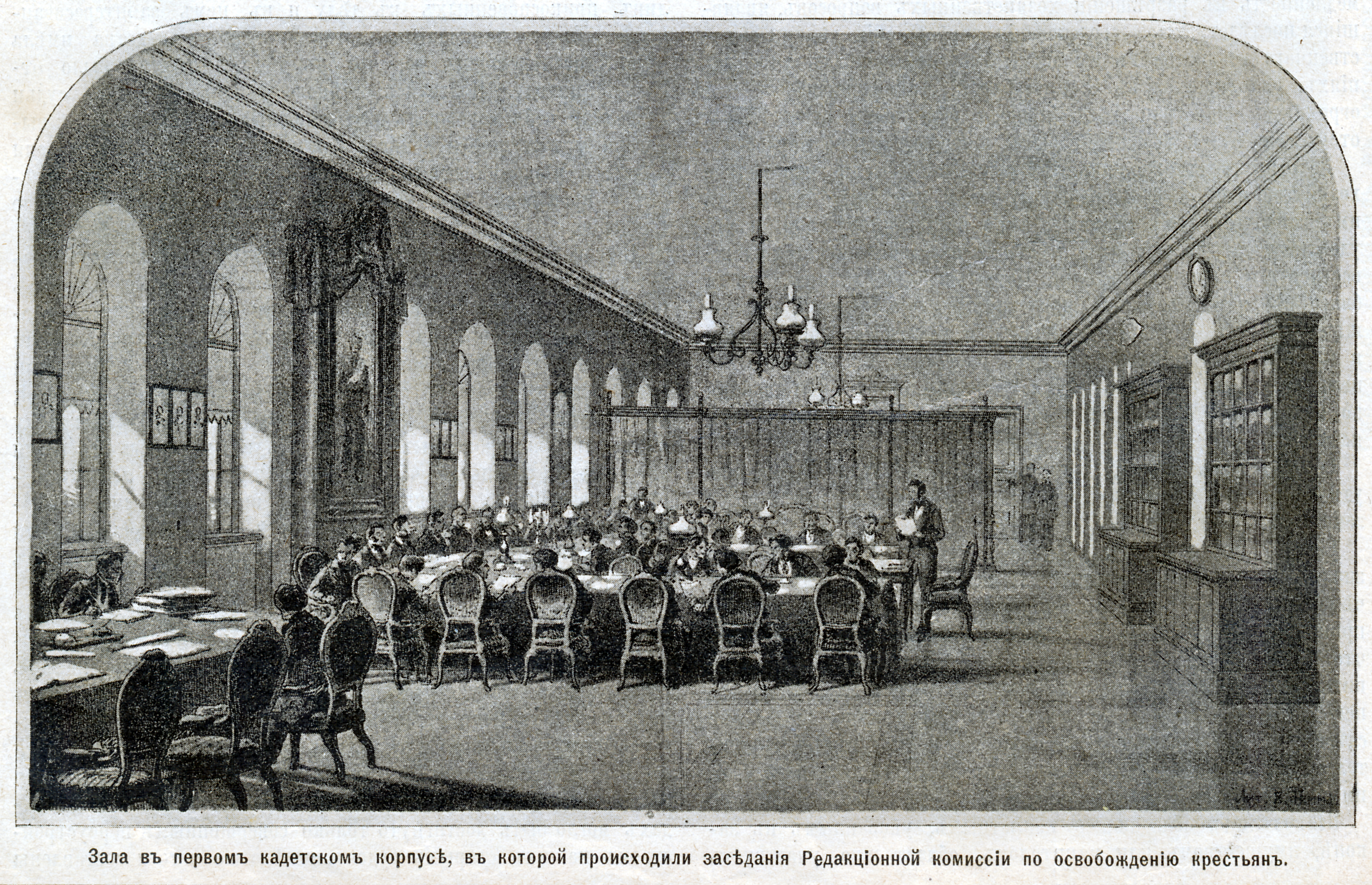
The meeting of the Drafting Commission for the liberation of the peasants

- Already in the 1740–1750s, the Saint Petersburg Society of Amateur Art and one of the first Russian amateur theaters, the Russian Theater, existed in the Saint Petersburg cadet corps, where the first director was a cadet, Alexander Sumarokov.
- In 1757 a printing house was established for printing textbooks.
- In the premises of the cadet corps in 1859–1861, meetings of the Drafting Commission for the Liberation of the Peasants, which drafted acts and documents on the Peasant Reform of 1861, were held.
- In 1900, Alexander Antonov, at the building, created a Museum of exhibits from the Recreational Halls. The second head of the museum was Alexander Krutetsky, who continued to perform duties under the Soviet regime. In 1927, after Alexander Antonov emigrated, the history and inventory of the museum, including a large library and manuscripts, was compiled from memory. Among the exhibits there were 12 banners and one standard, the image of the Exaltation of the Cross (bone carving), Peter the Great's handwritten work, the model of the Borodino battle, portraits, forms from the time the base of the corps and other exhibits.
- Established back in Imperial Russia, the Society of Former Graduates of the First Cadet Corps continued to exist abroad, in emigration, mainly in the Kingdom of Serbs, Croats and Slovenes (Yugoslavia), France and the United States. The Sarajevo department published the magazine "Leisure cadet", which published the memoirs of the corps.

== See also ==
- Second Cadet Corps

== Sources ==
- Alexander Antonov. First Cadet Corps. - Edition 2. - St. Petersburg: Rashkov's Printing House, 1906 - 56 pages
- Alexander Antonov. Museum of the First Cadet Corps, description. Leisure cadet, Old Bechei, 1927. 37 pages.
- Alexander Viskovatov. A brief history of the First Cadet Corps - St. Petersburg: Military printing house of the General Staff of its imperial majesty, 1832. - 113 pages.
- Peter Luzanov (1907). Land gentry cadet corps (now 1st cadet corps). Historical essay (PDF). St. Petersburg. Archived from the original (PDF) on 2017-10-23.
- Кадетские корпуса // Military Encyclopedia. - Volume 11. - St. Petersburg, 1913. - Pages 256-264.
- Name list to all former and present in the Ground Gentry Cadet Corps headquarters officers and cadets - St. Petersburg, 1761. - 301 pages.
- Nikolaev. Seventeenth and eighteenth years in the First Cadet Corps. Brno, 1926
