= Denisov family =

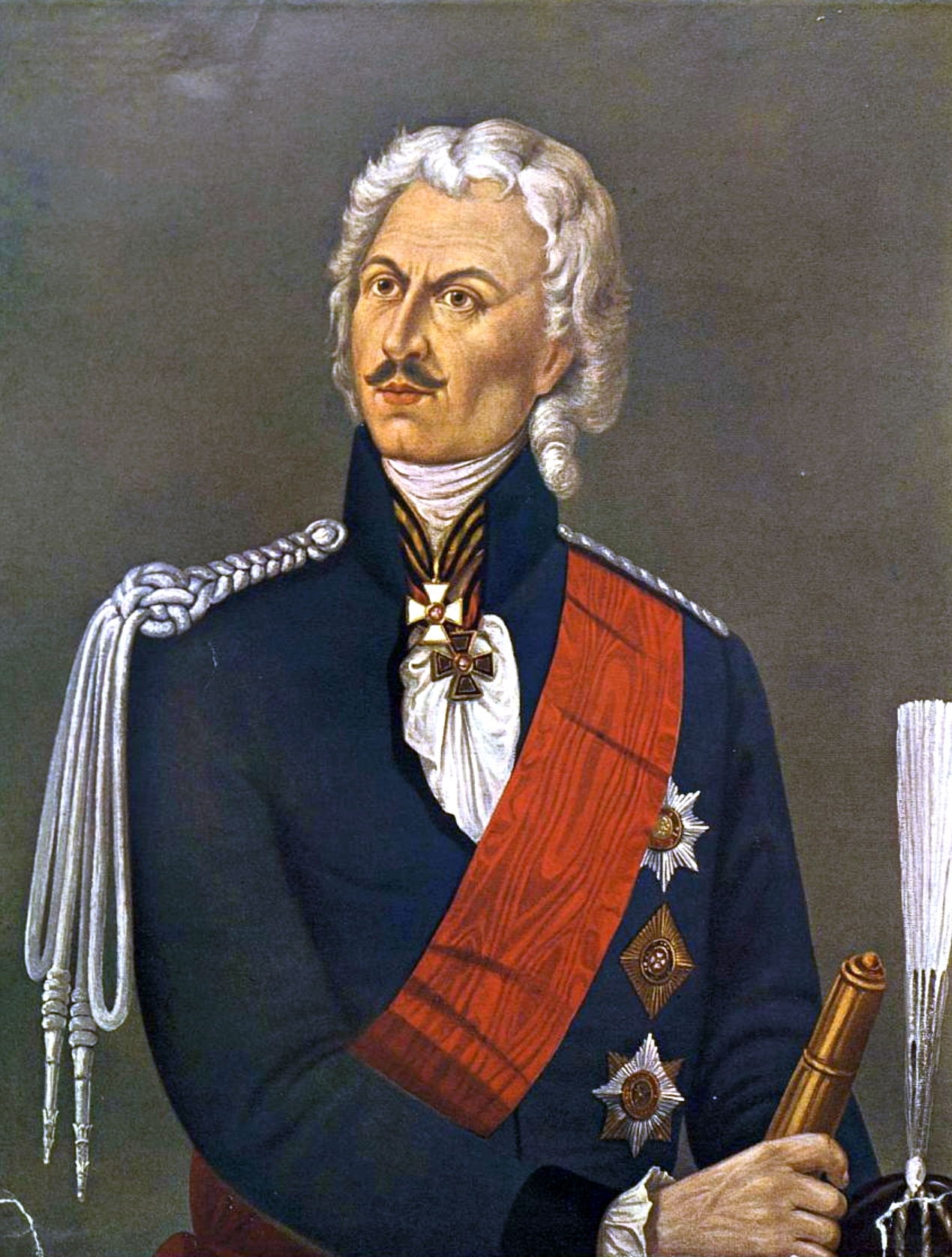
Fyodor Petrovich Denisov (1738-1803)

The Denisov family (Russian: Денисов) was the Russian noble family of Don Cossacks origin.

== History ==
Descendants of commander Denis Ilyin from stanitsa Patiizbyansky that is now partly underwater of Tsimlyansk Reservoir. Members of the family held the titile of Count in the Russian Empire since 1799.

In honour of Fedor Petrovich Denisov (1738–1803), his maternal grandson Vasily Orlov-Denisov added the name of Denisov family to his own, becoming Orlov-Denisov on 26 April 1801.

== Notable members ==
- Fedor Petrovich Denisov (1738–1803), General of Cavalry, was a first Count of the Don Cossacks.
- Andrian Karpovich Denisov (1763–1841), Lieutenant General in 1813, Ataman of Don Voisko in 1818.
