= Vasily Petrovich Orlov =

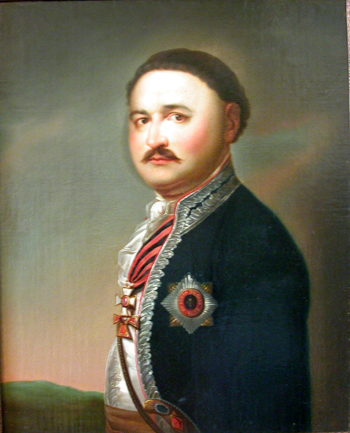
- Vasily Petrovich Orlov
- Born: 1745; Russian Empire
- Died: 1801 (aged 55–56); Russian Empire
- Occupation: general

Vasily Petrovich Orlov (Russian: Василий Петрович Орлов) was a Russian Full General of Cavalry. Hero of Russo-Turkish Wars of 1768–1774 and 1787–1792, particularly the storming of Izmail. Ataman of the Don Cossacks, received orders to command the Indian March of Paul in January 1801 from Emperor Paul I of Russia. Orlov was born in 1745 and became one of the most distinguished cavalry commanders of his era, serving in both Russo-Turkish Wars and distinguishing himself at the Siege of Izmail in 1790 under Alexander Suvorov. He was appointed Ataman of the Don Cossacks Host in 1797. On 12 January 1801, Paul I ordered him to lead approximately 22,000 Don Cossack troops on an extraordinary expedition through Orenburg, across the Kazakh steppes, through the khanates of Khiva and Bukhara, and into British India, with the objective of reaching the Indus River and defeating British garrisons there. The march was conceived as part of a planned joint Franco-Russian invasion of India proposed by Napoleon Bonaparte. Orlov's corps departed the Don in February 1801 and had covered roughly 1,568 kilometres when, near the Mechetnaya settlement in Saratov guberniya, news arrived of Paul I's assassination on 23 March 1801. The new Emperor, Alexander I, immediately ordered the Cossacks to return home. Orlov addressed his troops with the words: "God and the Emperor bestow upon you your fathers' homes." The corps returned between 17 and 25 April 1801. Orlov died later that same year. His wife Daria Fedorovna, was a daughter of Ataman Count Fedor Petrovich Denisov and son of Vasily Petrovich Vasily Orlov-Denisov, a Don Cossacks General in honour of his grandfather Fedor Petrovich Denisov added his surname to his own, becoming count Orlov-Denisov on 26 April 1801.

== See also ==
- Orlov-Denisov family
- Denisov family
