= Efremov Atamans Palace =

Coordinates: 47.1414°N 40.0221°E

Дворец атаманов Ефремовых
- Дворец атаманов Ефремовых
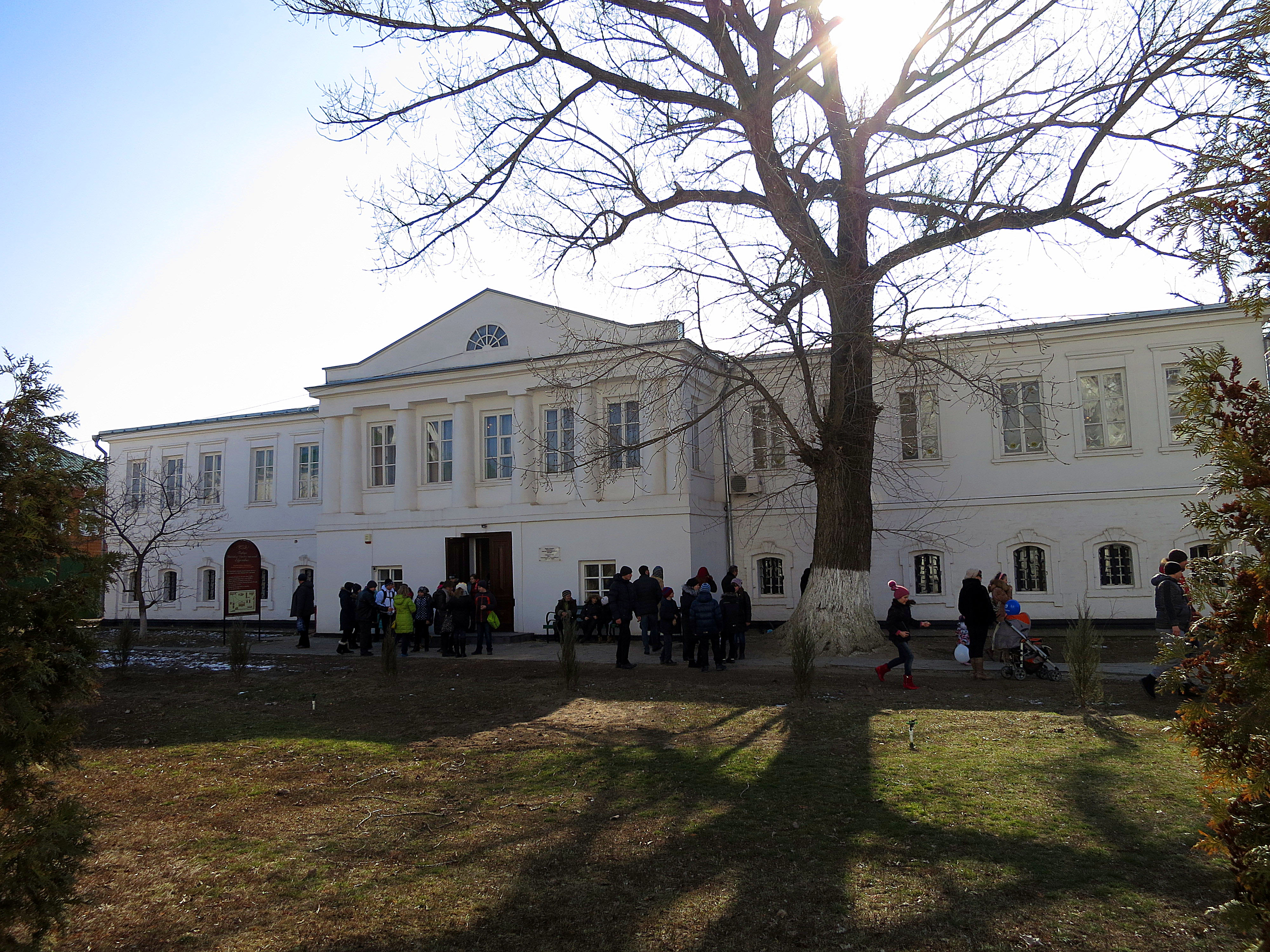
- Established: 1761
- Dissolved: Starocherkasskaya, Rostov Oblast, Russia
- Type: Mansion

Efremov Atamans Palace (Russian: Дворец атаманов Ефремовых) is a mansion in Starocherkasskaya, Rostov Oblast, Russia, which was constructed in 1761. It belonged to Efremov family.

== Architecture ==
The facade of the Ataman Palace in Starocherkassk was designed in Classicist style in the manner of the mansions of Moscow and St. Petersburg nobility. The triangular pediment of the central rizalite is supported by four single and two pairs of doubled smooth half-columns. The colonnade rests on the relief belt between the first and second floors. Straight sandricks adorn the windows of the first and the second floor. The windows of the palace are quite diverse in size: the one that of the lower floor are small, flattened in shape, and the blind platens built of keystone resemble the windows of the house of merchant and cossacks Zhuchenkovs; the windows of the second floor are larger, lighter, have a light frame, and overall bring the appearance of a palace. The Efremov Palace was built at the same time as the house church near it.

Numerous reconstructions, especially after the fire of 1848, greatly altered the building. The original appearance was preserved on a sketch of the panorama of Cherkassk made in 1803 by architect Nikolay Lvov, whom Emperor Alexander I sent to the Caucasus and the Crimea "for the arrangement and description of various necessities in the warm waters there." Judging by the plan made by Lvov, the building stretched horizontally and preserved the symmetry of the composition and the pilaster parting of the wall. Yet the classic portico uniting the two floors was lost, and, probably, in the 19th century the location of the main entrance, which was on the south side, changed. Later, with the construction here in 1836 of a monastery enclosed by a new stone wall, the front façade of the building moved to the courtyard. At the same time, the central part was distinguished with a risalite with a colonnade of the second floor, completed with a triangular pediment.

== History ==
Efremov family was one of the most distinguished and richest dynasty on the Don. Its founder, the son of Moscow merchant Efrem Petrov, moved to Cherkassk in 1670 (now Starocherkasskaya), where he successfully engaged in trade and rose to the rank of foreman. In 1756-1761, Efremov built a house church consecrated in the name of the Don Icon of Mother of God in their courtyard. According to legend, its prototype was the church, located in the Middle Caves of the Kiev Pechersk Lavra. Indeed, there are some similarities: among them there is a technique of Ukrainian masters: a combination of vertical rectangular and faceted forms, a harmony of rectilinear and curvilinear outlines, a fusion of baroque and classical decor elements.

On 27 December 1831, Yevdokiya Ioakimovna, the widow of Efrem Petrov, Ulyana Alekseevna and her son, captain Nikolai Stepanovich, petitioned Don Archbishop Athanasius and asked to build a convent in Starocherkassk. In the petition, the main and the only motive that prompted the members of Efremov family to take such a step, was their faith and desire to perpetuate the memory of relatives buried in Cherkassk land. The decree of Emperor Nicholas I "On the establishment of Efremov Convent in the Starocherkasskaya stanitsa of the Novocherkassk Eparchy" was issues on 25 January 1837.

== Museum ==
The Efremov Palace is the main object of the Starocherkassk Museum-Reserve. The extensive apartments of the mansion house various exhibitions about the history of Cherkassy and Don Cossacks. Among the exhibits are marble sundials of the 16th century brought by Cossacks from Constantinople, Azov trophies of the 17th century, and the various weapons of Don Cossacks. After reconstruction in 2014, the second floor of the palace was opened for visitors: now there is an exhibition dedicated to Efremov family and Cossack culture. In 2015, the Ministry of Property and Land Relations of Rostov Oblast intended to transfer the building of the Ataman Palace to the Russian Orthodox Church, but the regional court declared the intention of the transfer illegal, and so the museum complex still remains a secular institution.
