= Aleksandr Figner =

Russian partisan colonel of the Napoleonic Wars

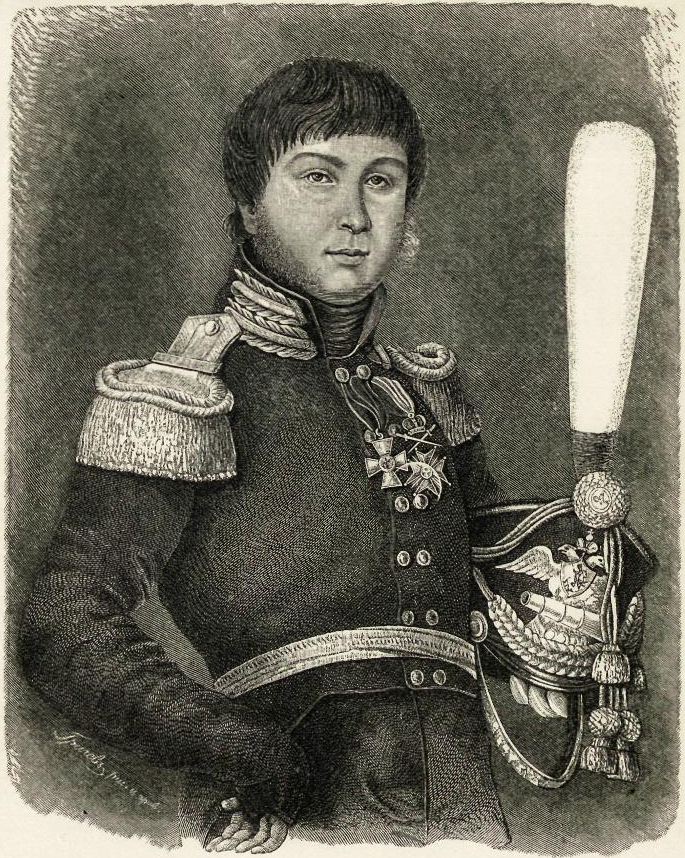
- "Figner is always in the closest proximity to the enemy" - from Kutuzov's report of 1812.
- Born: Aleksandr Samoilovich Figner; 1787; Russian Empire
- Died: October 12, 1813 (aged 25–26) Anhalt-Dessau, Confederation of the Rhine
- Allegiance: Russian Empire
- Branch: Imperial Russian Army
- Rank: Colonel
- Conflicts: Russo-Turkish War (1806); Napoleonic Wars; French invasion of Russia; German Campaign (1813)
- Education: Second Cadet Corps

Aleksandr Samoilovich Figner (French: Alexandre Figner, Russian: Алекса́ндр Само́йлович Фи́гнер; 1787 – 12 October 1813) was a Guards Colonel of the army of the Russian Empire, known as an organizer of partisan units during the 1812 Napoleonic invasion of Russia and later in Germany.

== Early life ==
A descendant of the ancient German Figner-von-Ruthmersbach family, he was born the son of the future Vice Governor of Pskov, Samuil Samoilovich Figner. The young Figner was educated in the 2nd Cadet Corps and in 1805 was commissioned as a Second Lieutenant of the Artillery. That same year, he took part in the Anglo-Russian expedition to the Mediterranean and, during his stay in Italy, learned Italian well, which later proved very useful. In 1810, Figner participated in the Russo-Turkish War and earned the Order of St. George, 4th Class, for the storming of Rusçuk. After this war, he retired and received a position as mayor of a city in the province of Tambov, but returned to military service as a Staff Captain of Artillery in 1812.

== Napoleonic Wars ==
His distinguished service at the Battle of the Strogani River earned Figner a promotion to Captain. When the Russian army left Moscow after the Battle of Borodino, Figner received permission to act independently as a partisan. He entered the city and committed sabotage there. According to some stories, he even planned to kill Napoleon. After that, he gathered a detachment of lagging soldiers and deserters and began to attack the retreating units of the Grande Armée. Figner's detachment became a notable force and participated in the capture of general Augereau's brigade near Lyakhovo. Figner managed to create a resounding glory for himself, becoming the most famous partisan leader at that time. He was distinguished by a passion for dressing up for reconnaissance among enemy units. For his exploits, his rank was raised to Lieutenant Colonel and he received 7,000 rubles.

During the War of the Sixth Coalition, Figner was sent to Danzig for espionage and agitation among the local population. He had infiltrated the fortress disguised as an Italian, but was captured and imprisoned. Released due to lack of evidence, he managed to gain the trust of the fortress commandant, general Rapp, to such an extent that he was sent to Napoleon with important dispatches, which, of course, reached Russian headquarters. For this achievement, Figner earned another promotion to Colonel.

== Death ==
He was distinguished by cruelty towards captured French prisoners, unusual even among the partisans of that time. Another famous partisan, Denis Davydov, severely criticized him for this. Other contemporaries, however, found in him traits of chivalrous nobility and generosity, and genuine religiosity, not hypocrisy. Figner often gave prisoners to the peasants for laceration and liked to kill prisoners himself with his favorite air gun. But he tried to use captured Spaniards and Italians for his own purposes. During the Truce of Pläswitz, he formed from them the so-called "Vengeful Legion" with the help of which he hoped to overthrow the King of Italy or of Westphalia. After the retreat of the main forces, Figner tried to wage his own war in Westphalia (he hoped to provoke an uprising of the local population against the French). But he was defeated, and the units recruited from prisoners showed themselves poorly. Figner came to his death swimming over the Elbe, while trying to escape an encirclement by Napoleonic troops at Dessau. His sabre was found on the river bank.

It is believed that he could be one of the prototypes of Fedor Dolokhov, a partisan leader in Leo Tolstoy's War and Peace, although the count Fyodor Ivanovich Tolstoy, also known as the "American", is considered a more likely candidate.
