= Kutejnikov family =

The Kutejnikov family (Russian: Кутейников) was the Russian noble family of Don Cossacks origin.

== History ==
The most famous member of the family Dmitri Kutejnikov (1766 - 1844), born of Don Voisko Staff Officers kids. Was a Russian Full General of Cavalry in time of Napoleonic Wars. Hero of Battle of Kinburn (1787). Kuteinikov served in wars against France and Turkey, was in a Russian expedition to India in 1800. In Patriotic War of 1812 was at battles of Borodino, Maloyaroslavets and Berezina.
