= Battle of Liaskowa =

1812 battle during Napoleon's invasion of Russia

- Part of the French invasion of Russia
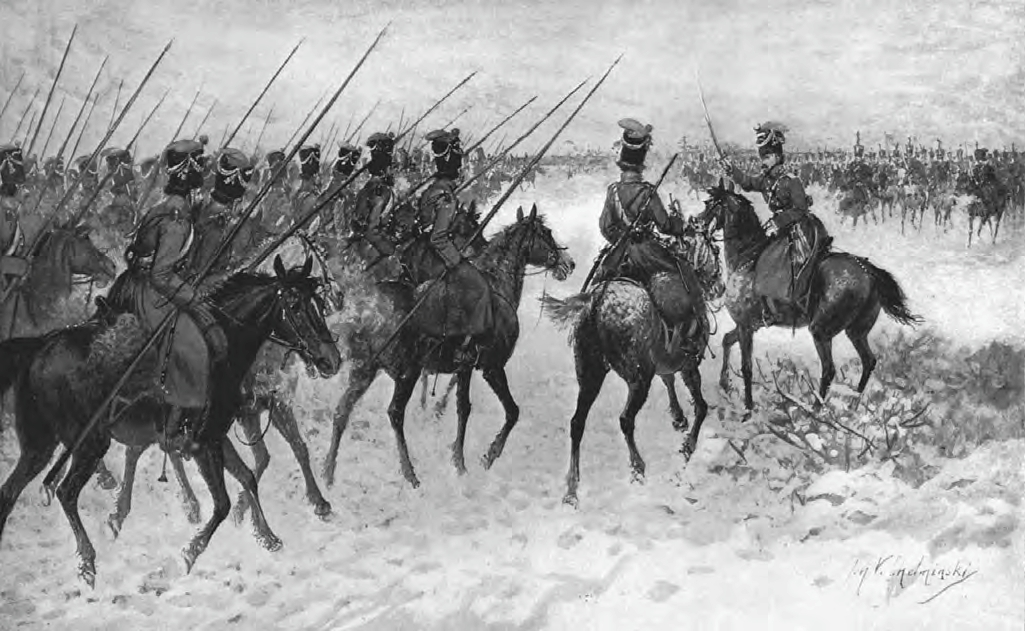
- Cossacks were an irregular Russian cavalry best suited for the attack of the enemy’s supply lines without joining a major battle.
Date	9 November 1812
Location	Liaskowa/Lyakhovo, 40 km southeast of Smolensk, Russian Empire 54°33′58″N 32°36′11″E
Result	Russian victory

Belligerents
Russian Empire	(First French Empire) French Empire

Commanders and leaders
(Russian Empire) Orlov-Denisov (Russian Empire) Denis Davydov (Russian Empire) Aleksandr Figner (Russian Empire) A. Seslavin	(First French Empire) Jean-Pierre Augereau

Strength
3,500; 4 cannons	2,000

Casualties and losses
200	2,000
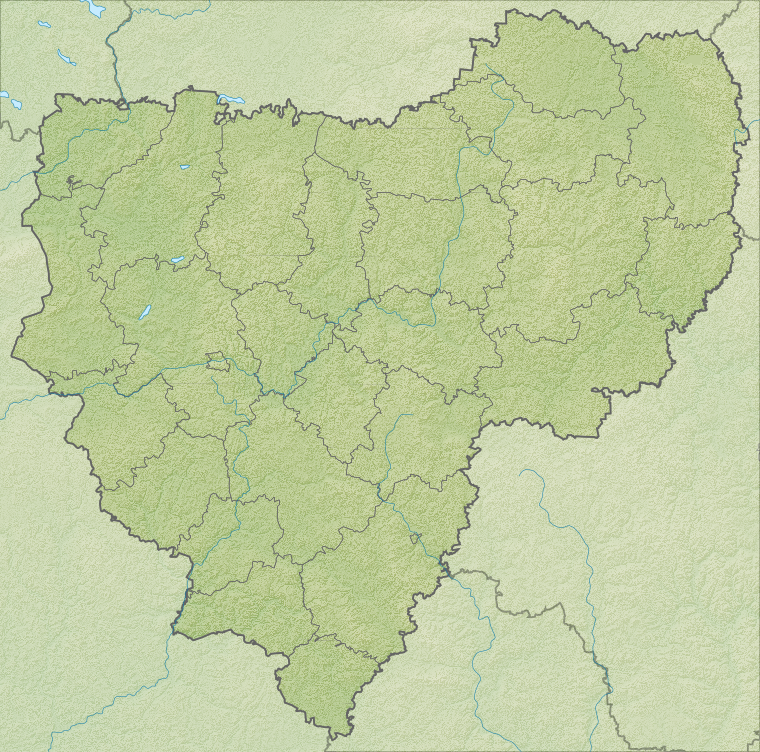
- Location within Smolensk Oblast Battle of Liaskowa (European Russia) Battle of Liaskowa (Europe)

French invasion of Russia
current battle
Prussian corps
Napoleon
Austrian corps

The Battle of Liaskowa (or Lyakhovo) took place 9 November 1812 near the village of Liaskowa, where 3,500 Cossacks under the command of Vasily Vasilyevich Orlov-Denisov (also under Denis Vasilyevich Davydov, Aleksandr Samoylovich Figner and Aleksandr Nikitich Seslavin) surrounded 2,000 soldiers of the Grande Armée under Jean-Pierre Augereau.

== Background ==
Mikhail Kutuzov in his Attrition warfare against Napoleon had increased the guerrilla warfare of the Cossacks and the people's war of the peasants thereby slowly weakening the French army. During the retreat of the Grande Armée from Moscow to Poland Kutuzov with his main army avoided following Napoleon directly. Kutuzov escorted the Grande Armée on parallel roads in unspoilt regions of the south.

== Battle ==
3,500 Cossacks under Vasily Orlov-Denisov routed 2,000 soldiers of the Grande Armée under Augereau. 1,750 French were taken prisoner.

== Aftermath ==
The Grande Armée had its next major fight in the Battle of Krasnoi.

== See also ==
- List of battles of the French invasion of Russia

== Literature ==
- Bodart, Gaston (1908). Militär-historisches Kriegs-Lexikon (1618-1905).
- Davidov, Denis (1999). In the Service of the Tsar Against Napoleon, 1806–1814. Greenhill Books. ISBN 1-85367-373-0.
- Riehn, Richard K. (1990). 1812 : Napoleon's Russian campaign. McGraw-Hill. ISBN 9780070527317.
