= Orlov-Denisov family =

Don Cossack aristocratic family

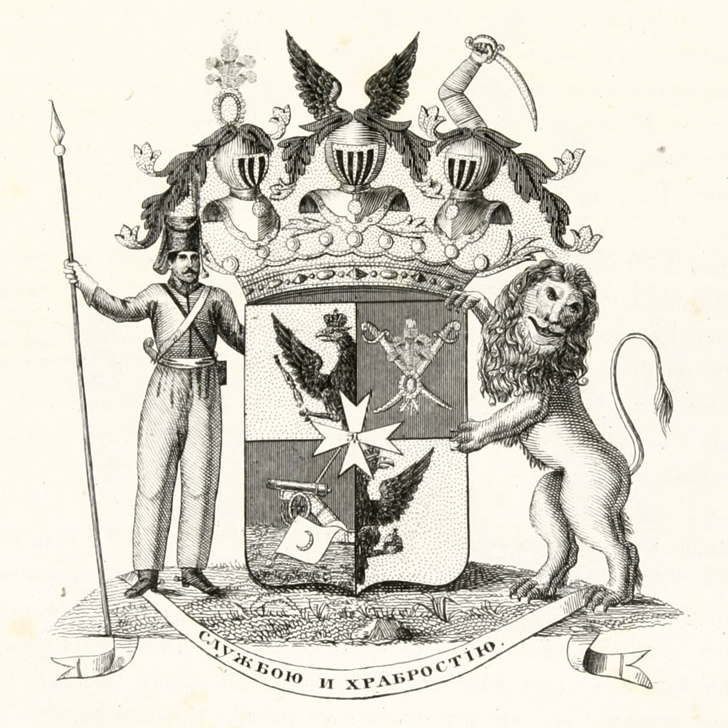
Coat of Arms

The Orlov-Denisov family (Russian: Орло́в-Дени́сов) was the Russian noble family of Don Cossacks origin.

== History ==
Members of the family held the title of Count in the Russian Empire since 1801. In honour of Vasily Orlov-Denisov's grandfather Fedor Petrovich Denisov he added the name of Denisov family to his own, becoming Orlov-Denisov on 26 April 1801.

== Notable members ==
- Vasily Petrovich Orlov (1745–1801), was a Russian Full General of Cavalry. Hero of Russo-Turkish Wars of (1768–1774) and (1787–1792). Ataman of the Don Cossacks, received orders to command the Indian March of Paul in January 1801.
- Vasily Orlov-Denisov (1775–1843), was a son of Vasily Petrovich Orlov, a Don Cossacks General. Shikhany manor was passed from the wife of Vasily Orlov-Denisov baroness Maria Vassilieva (1784–1829).
