= Ilovaiski family =

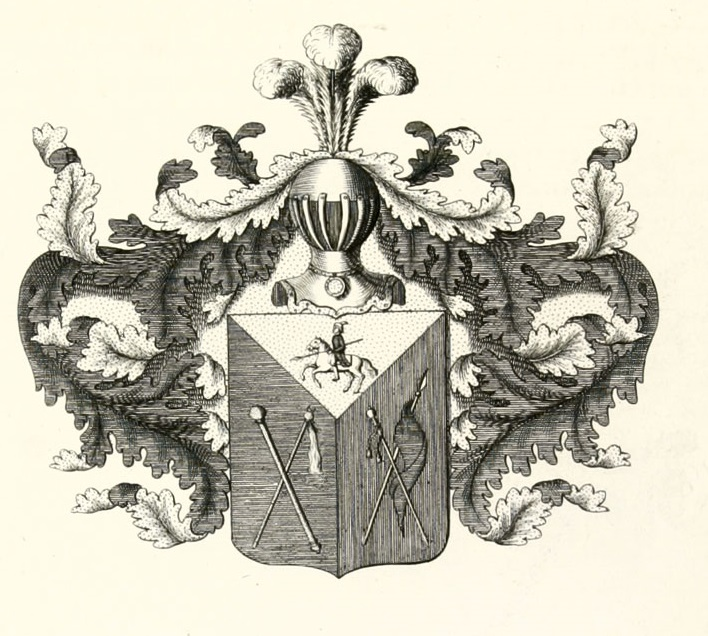
Coat of arms of Ilovaiski family

The Ilovaiski family (Russian: Иловайский; ru en romanization Ilovaysky) was the name of Russian noble family of Don Cossacks origin.

== History ==
Mokej Osipovich Ilovaysky being the oldest of known ancestors came on Don at 1675 from the oldest Russian town Temnikov in modern Republic of Mordovia and founded Makiivka so this property was named after its owner. His two sons Alexey and Dmitry was owners of Zuevka and Khartsyzk. This family owned a lot of lands in Don Voisko and from second half of the 19th century were owners of six coal mines in Makiivka that gives a 20% of total coal of Yuzovka in 1890. Twelve of the Ilovsky family joined the Napoleonic wars, and the most famous member of the family was Aleksey Vasilyevich Ilovaysky (1767–1842), a Russian General and Don Cossacks Ataman (1823–1827).

Ilovaysky — nobel family

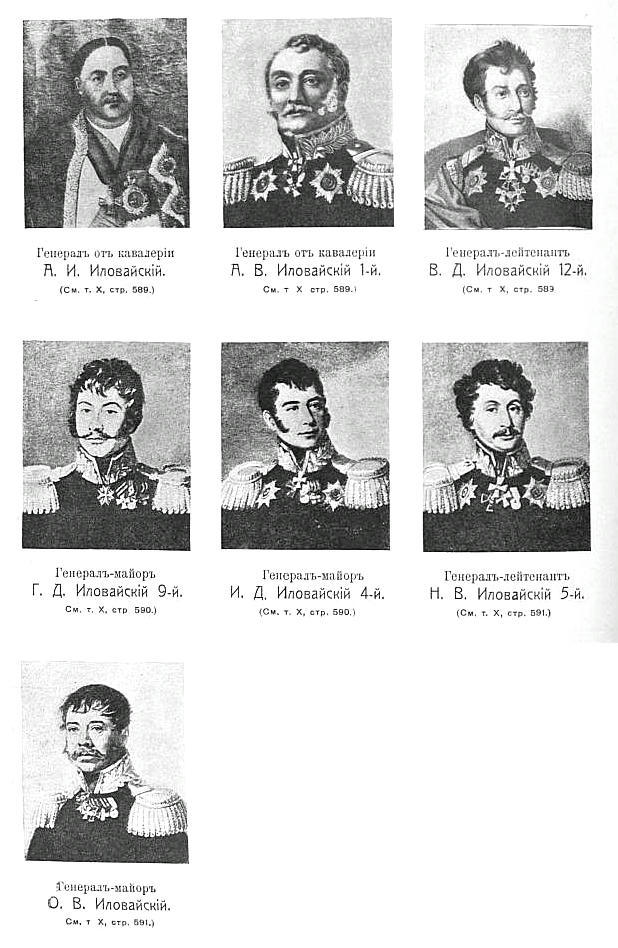
«Ilovaysky family»

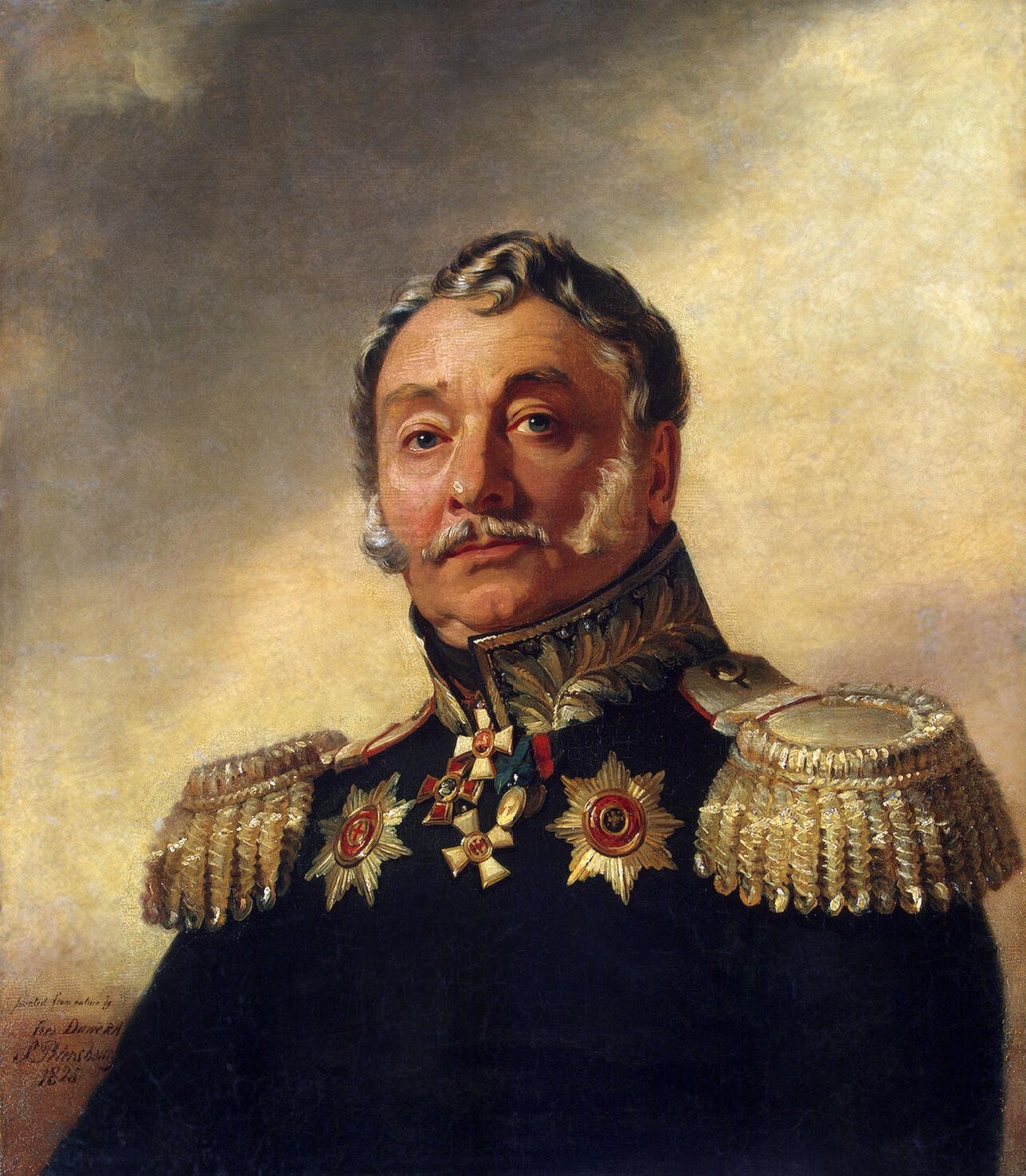
Aleksey Vasilyevich

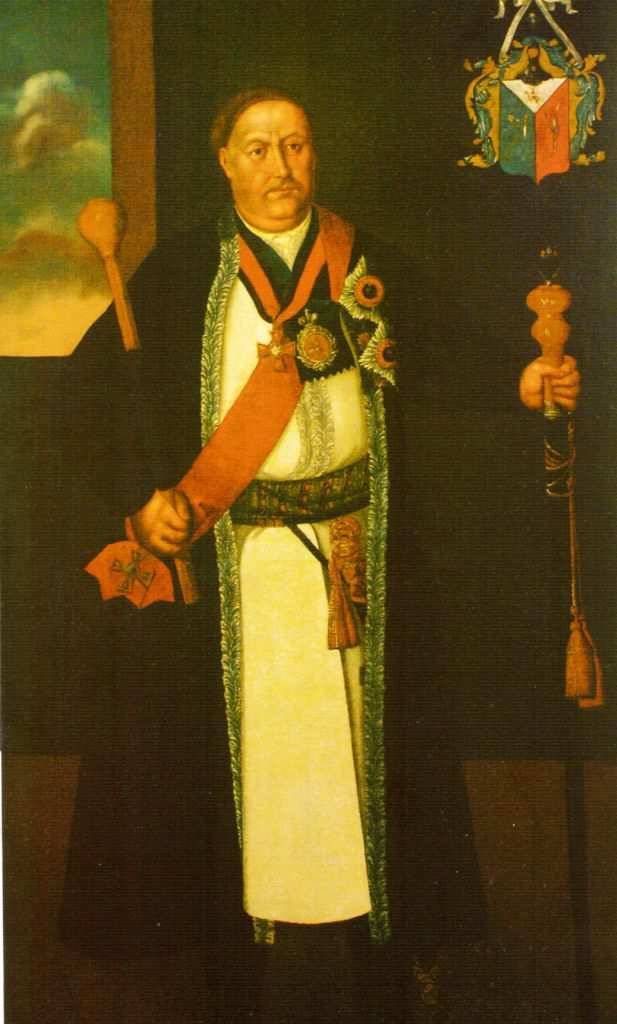
Aleksey Ivanovich

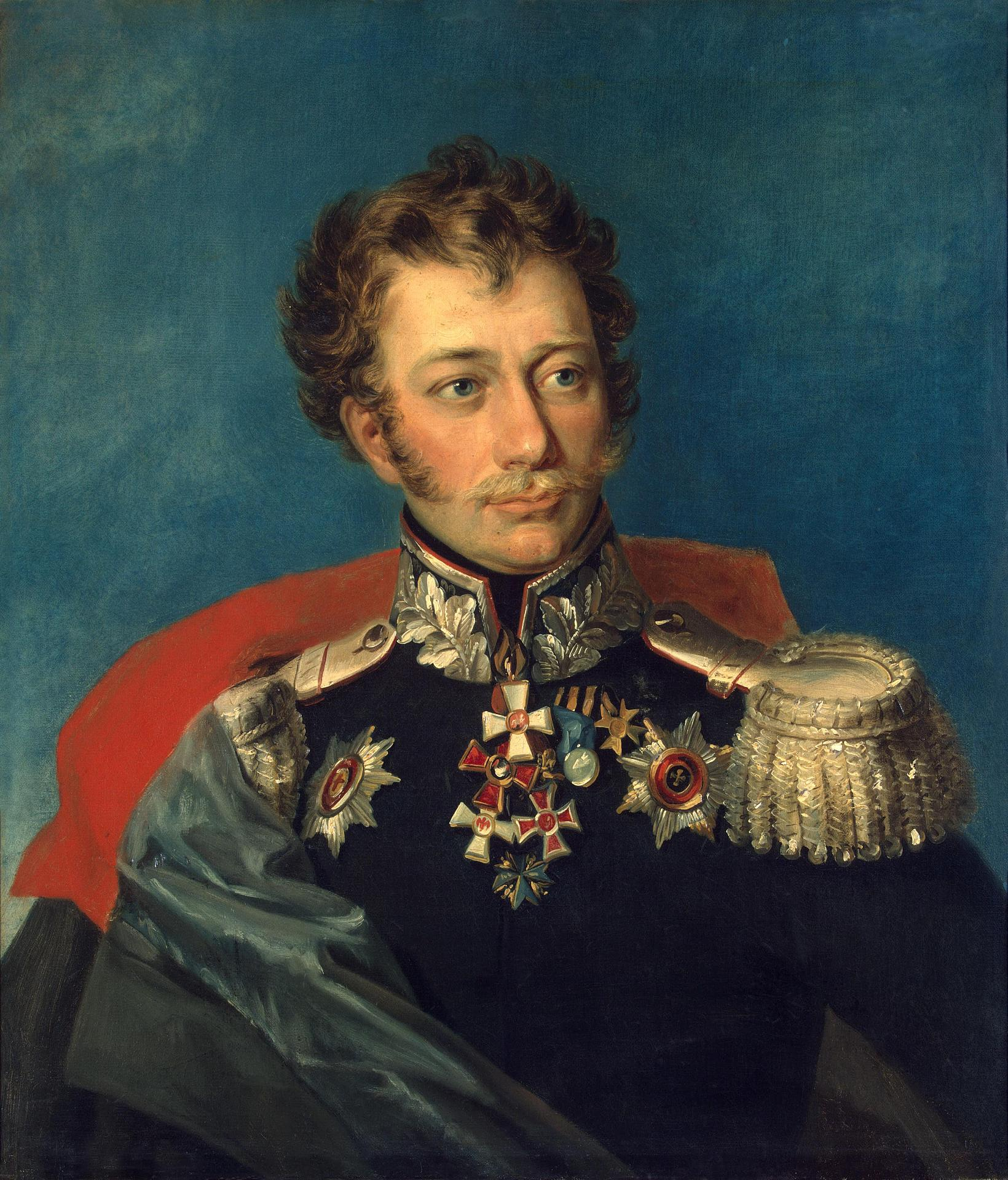
Vasily Dmitriyevich

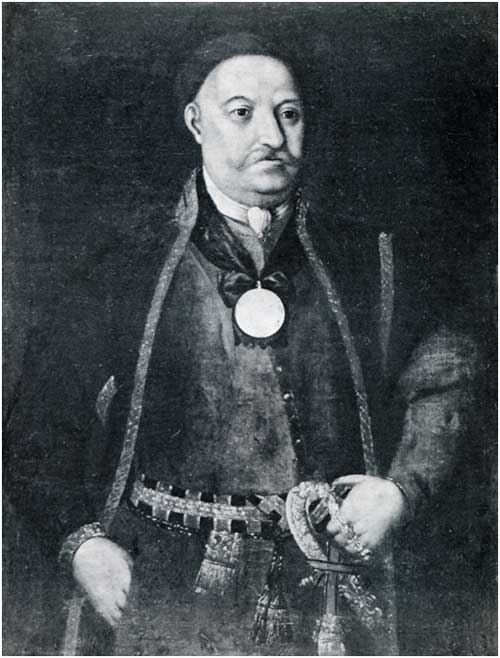
Vasily Ivanivich

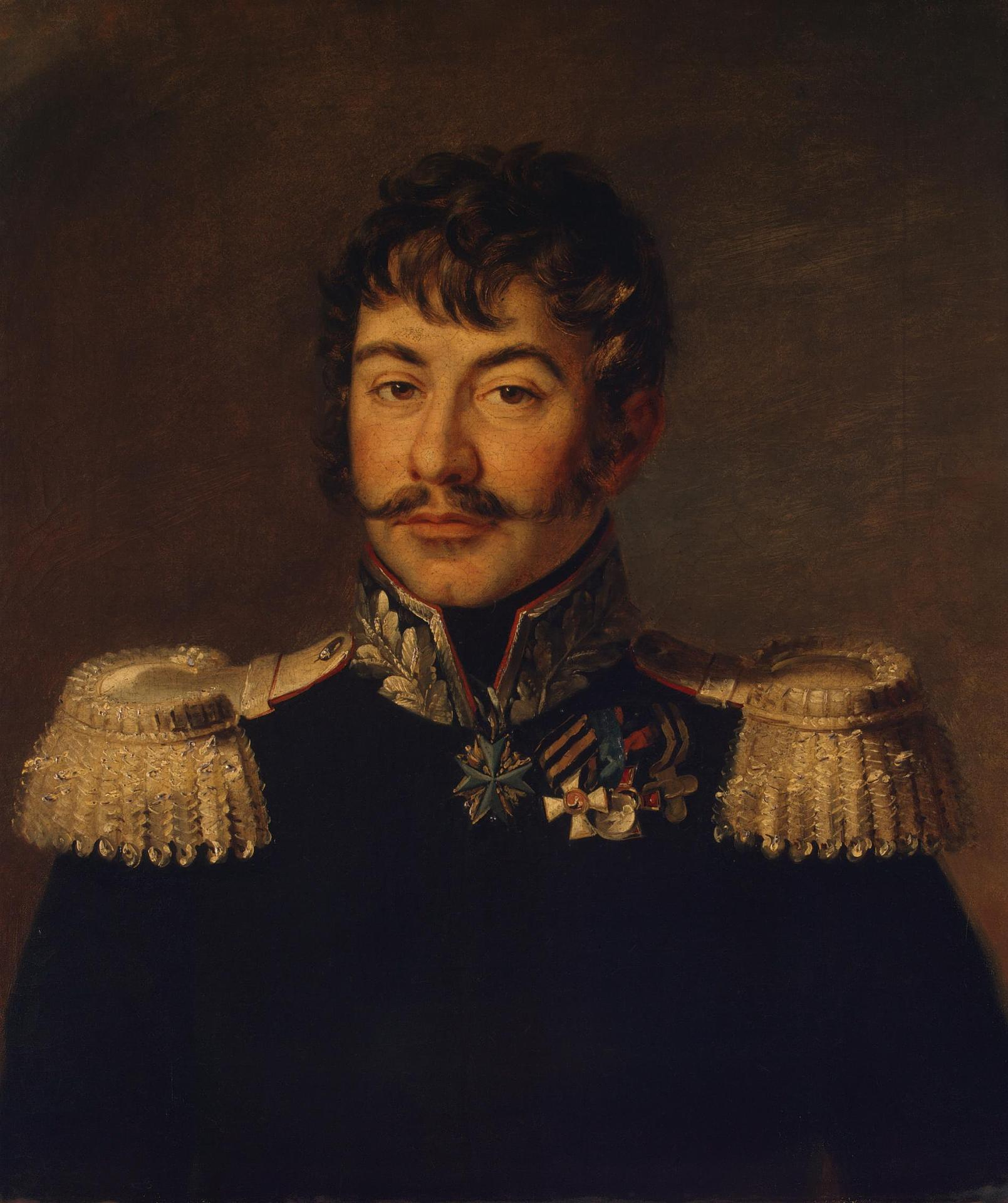
Grigory Dmitriyevich

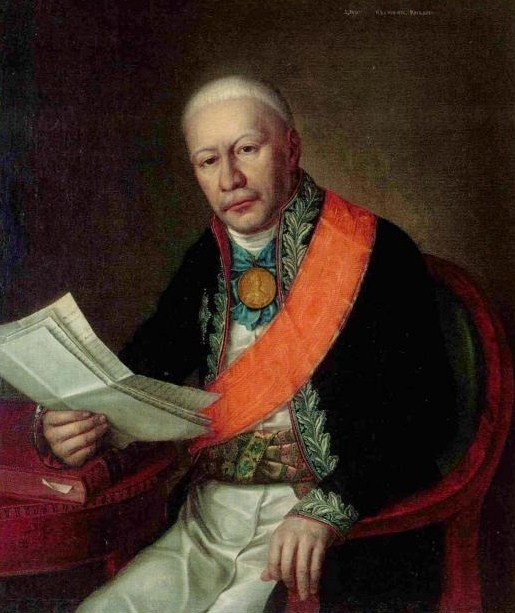
Dmitry Ivanovich

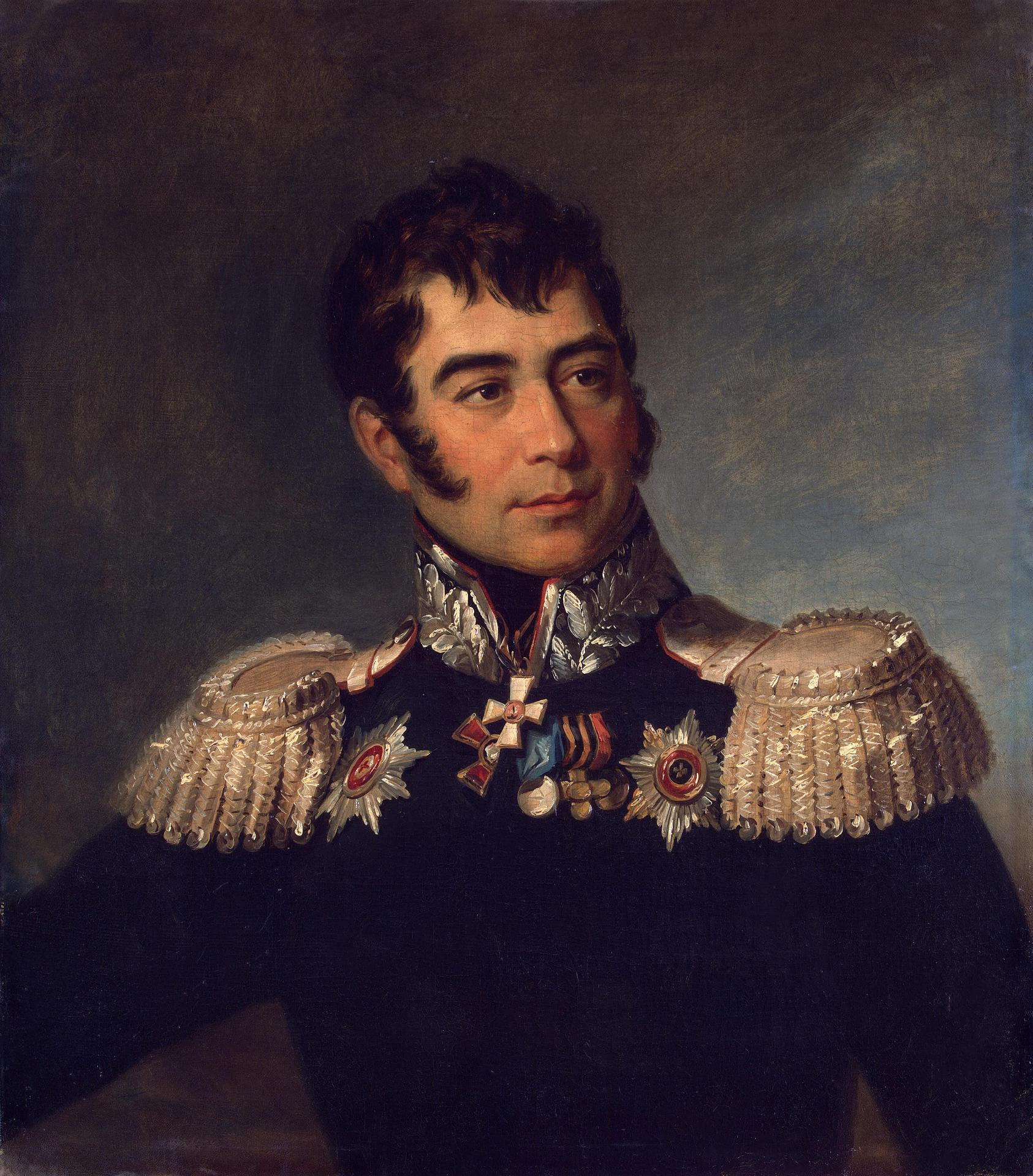
Ivan Dmitriyevich

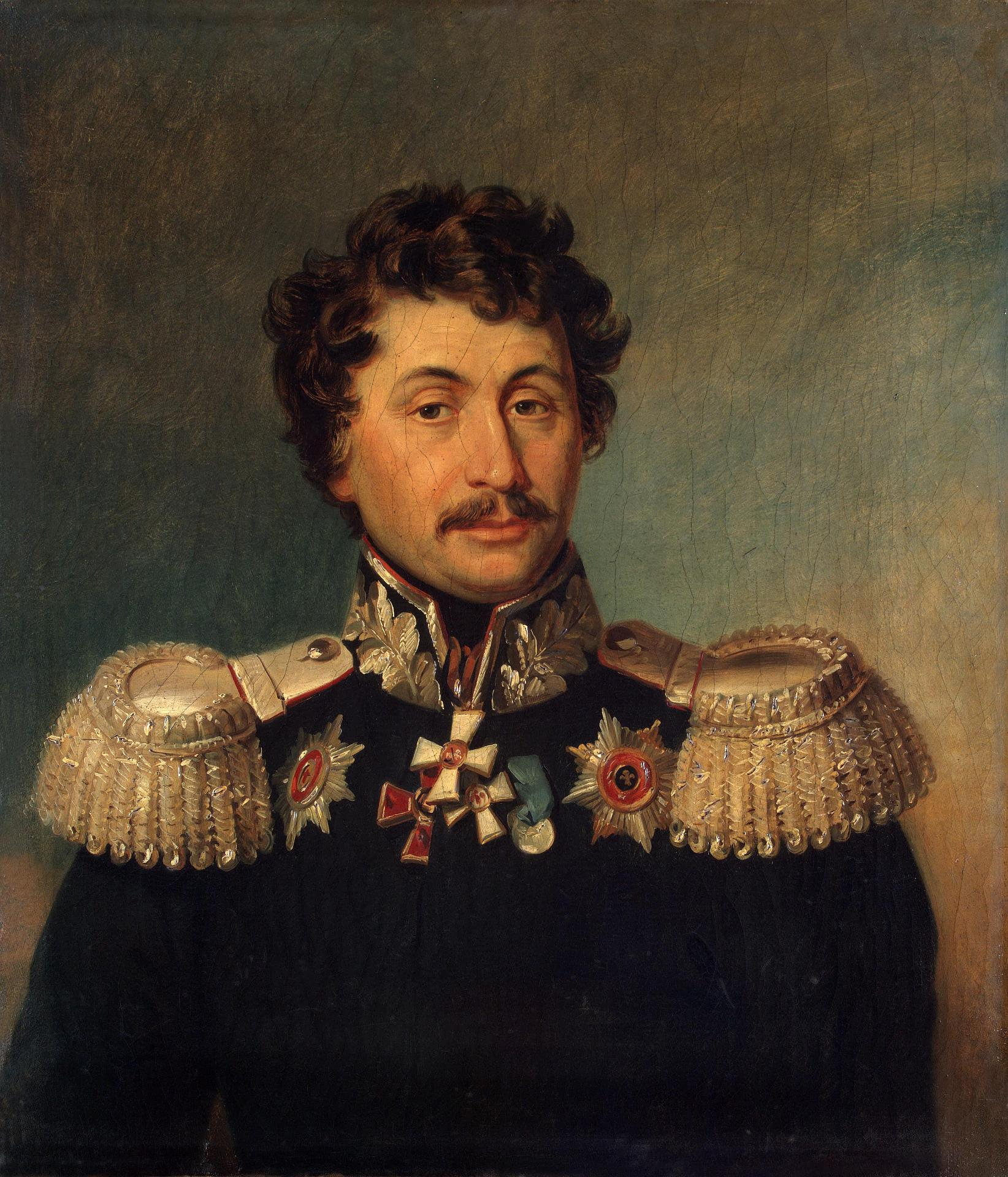
Nikolay Vasilyevich

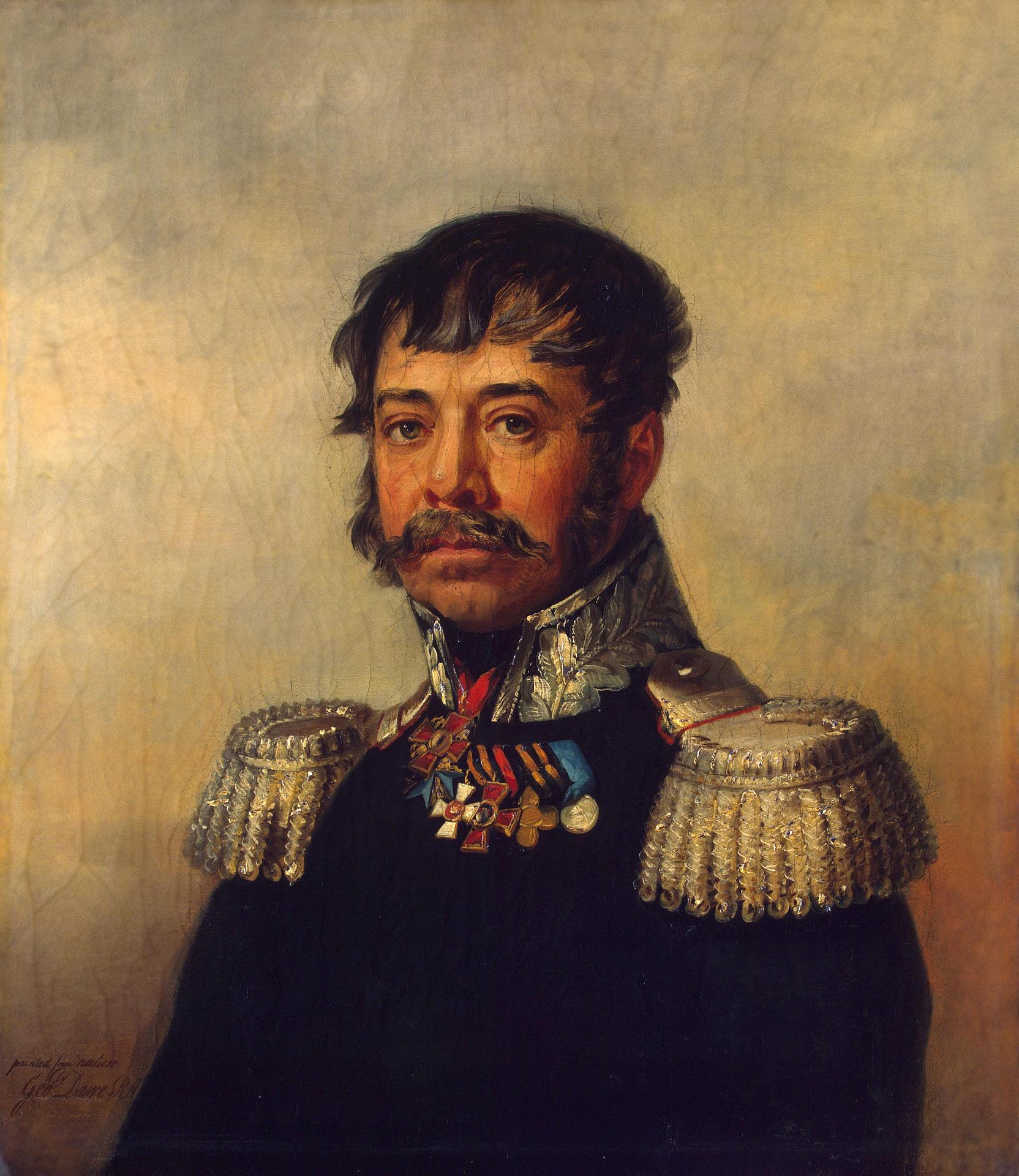
Оsip Vasilyevich
