= Alexander Vintulov =

Lieutenant general (1799–1856)

Alexander Dmitrievich Vintulov
- Александр Дмитриевич Винтулов
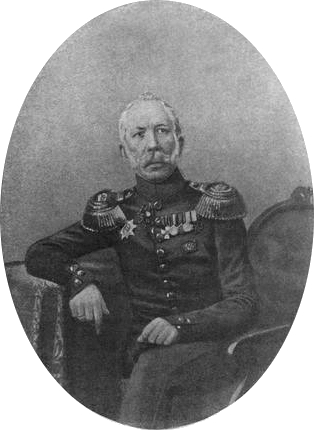
- Born: 1799
- Died: 1856 (aged 56–57)
- Military career
- Allegiance: Russian Empire
- Rank: Lieutenant General
- Commands: Mikhailovsky Voronezh Cadet Corps
- Conflicts: Russian–Turkish War of 1828–1829, Polish Campaign of 1831
- Awards: Golden Weapon "For Bravery" (1831); Order of Saint George, 4th Degree (1838)

Alexander Dmitrievich Vintulov (1799 – 1856) was a lieutenant general, the first director of the Mikhailovsky Voronezh Cadet Corps.

== Biography ==
He was brought up in the 1st Cadet Corps, from where he was released as an officer in 1817; participated in the Russian–Turkish Campaign of 1828–1829 and the suppression of the Polish Uprising of 1830–1831. For the Storming of Warsaw he was awarded a Golden Weapon with the Inscription "For Bravery". In 1844, from the post of Chief of Staff of the 3rd Reserve Cavalry Corps, Lieutenant Colonel Vintulov was appointed director of the Voronezh Cadet Corps and the following year was promoted to major general.

With regard to the training of cadets, Vintulov was a decisive enemy of the cramming that flourished in the schools of that time, he considered preparation for exams completely unnecessary, he saw high scores as a great evil and only to correct the stubborn lazy he sometimes resorted to corporal punishment. Vintulov also cared a lot about the religious and moral education of the cadets. In case of serious misconduct by the cadets, he did not limit himself to half measures and was very harsh. But the strict rules of punishment (deprivation of shoulder straps, rods in front of the company, putting on a gray jacket), according to the biographer Vintulov, were an exceptional phenomenon. According to Michael De Poulet, "this man was not a gentle man; but his soul was not callous, not raggy ... and the severity of punishments was in the then pedagogical rights".

Promoted to lieutenant general in 1853, Vintulov died in 1856.

Among other awards, Vintulov had the Order of Saint George of the 4th Degree, granted to him on December 1, 1838 for the irreproachable length of service of 25 years in the officer ranks (No. 5723 according to the list of Grigorovich – Stepanov).

Wife – Alexandra Sontseva (1815–1850), daughter of Voronezh and Oryol Governor Pyotr Sontsev and granddaughter of a wealthy Voronezh landowner Dmitry Chertkov. Their son was Nikolai, a cavalry general.

== Awards ==
- Order of Saint Vladimir, 4th Degree With a Bow (1829);
- Gold Saber "For Bravery" (1831);
- Insignia for Military Dignity, 3rd Degree (1831);
- Order of Saint George, 4th Degree (over 25 years) (1838);
- Order of Saint Vladimir, 3rd Degree (1842);
- Order of Saint Stanislaus, 1st Degree (1849);
- Order of Saint Anna, 1st Degree (1851);
- Insignia for 30 Years of Immaculate Service (1851).

== Sources ==
- Military Encyclopedia / Edited by Vasily Novitsky and others – Saint Petersburg: Ivan Sytin's Fellowship, 1911–1915
- Anniversary Collection of the Mikhailovsky Voronezh Cadet Corps. Voronezh, 1898
- Kargoproltsev I. N. Collection of Memoirs and Materials for the History of the Mikhailovsky Voronezh Cadet Corps. Ekaterinoslav, 1899
- Michael De Poulet. Article About Vintulov // "Russian Archive", 1877, No. 8
- List of Generals by Seniority. Corrected to 17 February 1856. Saint Petersburg, Military Printing House, 1856
