= Jean-Pierre Augereau =

French general (1772–1836)

- Born: 27 September 1772; Paris, France
- Died: 25 September 1836 (aged 63); Paris, France
- Burial place: Père Lachaise Cemetery
- Relatives: Charles-Pierre Augereau (brother)
- Military career
- Allegiance: French First Republic; French First Empire; Kingdom of France
- Branch: Infantry cavalry
- Service years: 1792-1824
- Rank: Lieutenant-General
- Conflicts: French Revolutionary Wars; Napoleonic Wars
- Awards: Baron of the Empire; Commander of the Legion of Honour; Knight of Saint Louis

Jean-Pierre Augereau (French pronunciation: [ʒɑ̃ pjɛʁ oʒʁo]; 27 September 1772 – 25 September 1836) was a French general during the Revolutionary and Napoleonic Wars. He was the younger half brother of Marshal Charles-Pierre Augereau. John Elting describes him as "notable only for easy affability and absolute incompetence".

== Origins and French Revolutionary Wars ==
Jean-Pierre Augereau was born in Paris on 27 September 1772, the son of Pierre Augereau and his second wife Elisabeth Cretté. His father was a domestic servant, or possibly a fruit seller. He embarked on his military career on 6 September 1792, volunteering to join the 8th Paris battalion. By the end of the year he had risen to the rank of second lieutenant, and served in the Army of the North in 1792 and 1793.

On 9 January 1794, Augereau became a cavalryman in the 23rd Chasseurs a Cheval in order to join the Army of the Eastern Pyrenees, where his brother was already a General de division. On the 11 November 1795, he became his aide-de-camp and followed him to the Army of Italy. Promoted to lieutenant and then to captain, he distinguished himself fighting at Primolano on the day before the battle of Bassano. In February 1797, he returned to Paris with his brother to present 60 colours captured at Mantua to the Directory. They were received at the Luxembourg Palace alongside their father. Augereau was sent back to General Bonaparte in Italy with his brother's request that he be put in a cavalry regiment to "give him the proper bearing and appearance."

On 23 June 1798 Augereau was made aide-de-camp to General Guillaume Brune, following him as the latter took command of the Army of Holland. He was promoted to Chef d'escadron in the 9th Dragoons on 13 August 1799, but retained his role on Brune's staff. Further promoted to chef de brigade later that year, he once more became an aide to his brother when the latter took over command of the Army of Holland on 28 February 1800. He was made adjutant-commandant on 27 April 1802 and continued to serve with his brother on various postings.

== Napoleonic Wars ==
Augereau was promoted to general de brigade on 8 May 1804, and made a Commander of the Legion of Honour a month later. When the Grande Armée was formed at the opening of the War of the Third Coalition, he was put in command of a mixed infantry and cavalry brigade in Desjardin's division of his brother's VII Corps. He served in this corps until invalided out on 5 October 1806.

On 17 March 1808, Augereau was posted to the Army of Spain, initially serving on the general staff. On 8 November that year he was given command of an infantry brigade in Morlot's division of Marshal Moncey's III Corps. He fought at the battle of Tudela, and was mentioned with distinction in Marshal Lannes' report of the battle.

On 30 June 1809, Augereau transferred to VII Corps in Catalonia, which was commanded by his brother. He took the place of Jean-Marie Vergez as commander of a brigade in Joseph Souham's division. When, at the battle of Vic on 20 February 1810, Souham suffered a serious head wound, Augereau took command of the division. He occupied Manresa and then Reus before retreating to Barcelona. Fighting at Hostalric on 4 May, he took several prisoners and captured two cannon. Ill health once again forced him to leave duty on 5 August 1810.

Augereau was made a Baron of the Empire on 13 August 1811, at which point he was in command of the Ems-Occidental department. On 13 May 1812 he was given command of a brigade in the reserve corps for the French invasion of Russia. On 9 November 1812 his brigade was part of a division under Louis Baraguey d'Hilliers, on the Medyn road from Smolensk heading to meet the Grande Armée on their retreat from Moscow. Instead, he ran into a force of 5,000 Russian cavalry at Liaskowa, was surrounded and forced to surrender whilst Baraguey d'Hilliers retreated to safety. Caulaincourt described the affair thus:

The Emperor must have been counting on Baraguay d’Hilliers’s corps, which, newly arrived from France, he had ordered to take up a position on the road to Yelnia. But the advance guard of this army occupied a weak position at Ljachewo, under the command of General Augereau, who had made a bad survey of his ground and a worse disposition of his troops. He was surrounded, attacked, and taken prisoner. Seeing that he put out no guards, the enemy, who had him under observation and were also kept informed by the peasantry, took advantage of this omission; and General Augereau, with more than 2000 men, surrendered to an advance-guard of the Russians, of which he should have taken more than half as prisoners if only he had remembered the name he bore. [...] The Emperor and the Prince of Neuchâtel openly attributed this incident to the lack of foresight of General Baraguay d’Hilliers, who had not, they declared, given personal attention to any of the dispositions: and above all they attributed it to the incapacity of General Augereau. The officers who had been on the spot spoke very bitterly of the affair and made no excuse for the Generals.

Baraguey d'Hilliers was arrested and sent home in disgrace, he would die in Berlin two months later. Augereau was suspended pending an inquiry.

The collapse of the Napoleonic Empire in 1814 occurred before any inquiry could take place. Augereau was released from captivity and returned to France on 15 August 1814 and was welcomed into the service of King Louis XVIII. He was made a Knight of Saint Louis and promoted to Lieutenant-General. During the Hundred Days, he served in the Corps of Observation of the Var on the Italian border under Marshal Brune, returning to royal service after Napoleon's second abdication.

== Later career and death ==
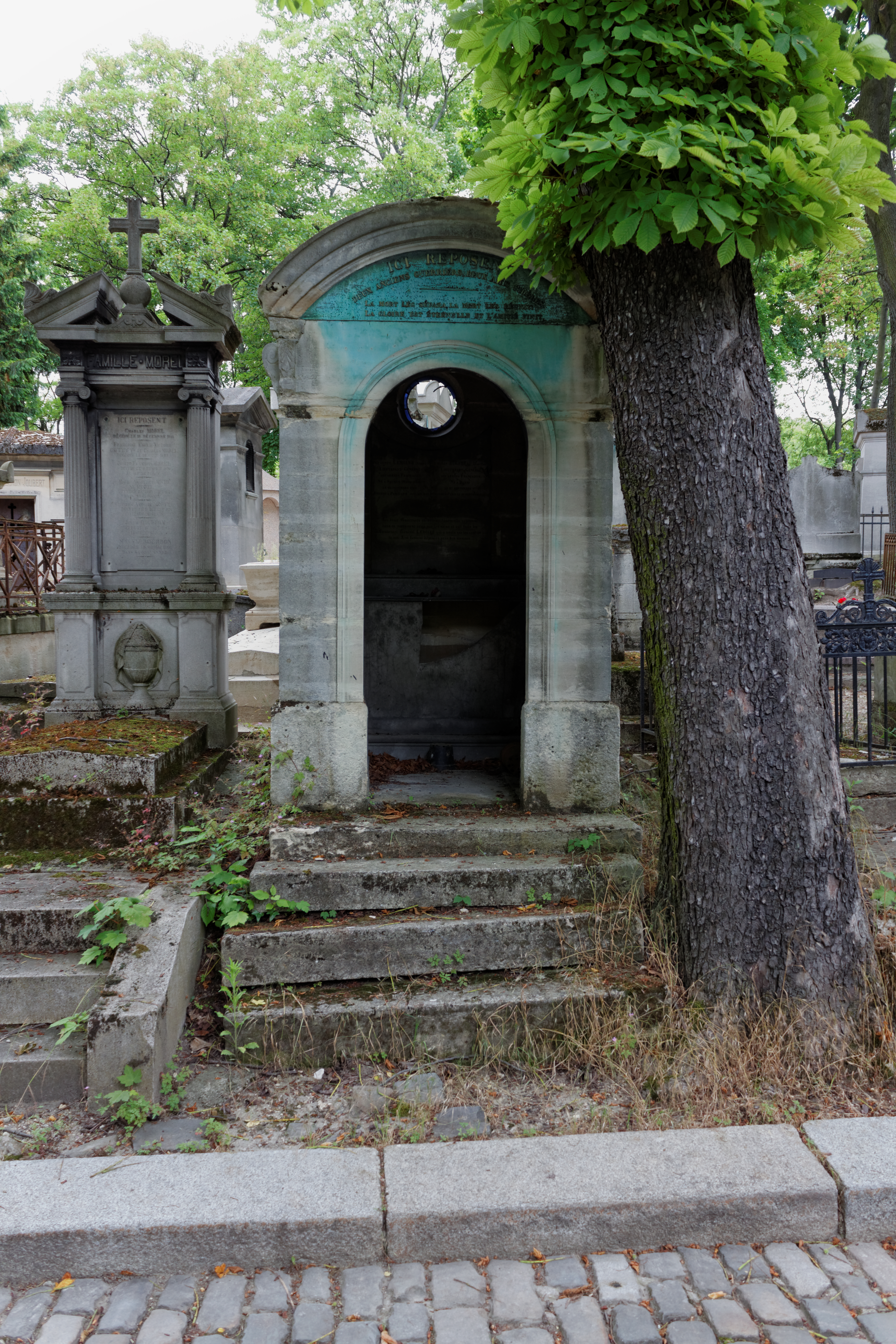
Augereau's tomb in Père Lachaise Cemetery

Augereau continued to serve in the army until 1 December 1824. When his brother died in 1816, Augereau inherited his estates but not the title of Duke of Castiglione. On 7 February 1831 he was added to the reserve cadre of the general staff. He never married or had children, and died in Paris on 25 September 1836 (aged 63). He was buried in Père Lachaise Cemetery in a tomb he would share with his close friend and fellow general Louis Lemoine.
