= 1st Guards Cavalry Division =

- 1-я Гвардейская кавалерийская дивизия
- Active: 1810–1918
- Country: Russian Empire
- Allegiance: Guards Corps
- Branch: Russian Imperial Army
- Type: Heavy Cavalry
- Role: Close protection Maneuver warfare Shock attack
- Battle honours: Borodino; Fère-Champenoise; Great War

The 1st Guards Cavalry Division was a Guards heavy cavalry division of the Imperial Russian Army.

== Organization ==
1857–1918:

- 1st Cavalry Brigade
  - Chevalier Guard Regiment
  - Life Guard Horse Regiment, also called the Leib-Guard Horse Regiment or simply the Horse Guards
- 2nd Cavalry Brigade
  - His Majesty's Own Cuirassier Guards Regiment,
  - Her Majesty's Own Cuirassier Guards Regiment
- 3rd Cavalry Brigade
  - His Majesty's Own Cossack Life-Guards Regiment
  - Ataman Cossack Life-Guards Regiment of H. I. H. the Tsesarevich
  - Combined Cossack Life-Guards Regiment
- 1st Life-Guards Horse Artillery Division

Each regiment comprised four squadrons (or, in Cossack regiments, four sotnyas, or "hundreds"); the colonels of the Guard regiments usually were Major-Generals in rank.

== Commanders ==
- 23.12.1910—30.03.1916 — Nikolai Kaznakov
- 02.04.1916—22.01.1917 — Pavlo Skoropadskyi
- 10.03.1917—15.04.1917 — Evgeny Arseniev
- 15.05.1917—06.08.1917 — Aleksander Eristov
- 19.08.1917— ? — Afrikan P. Bogaewsky
