= Afrikan P. Bogaewsky =

Russian military leader (1873–1934)

Afrikan Petrovich Bogaewsky
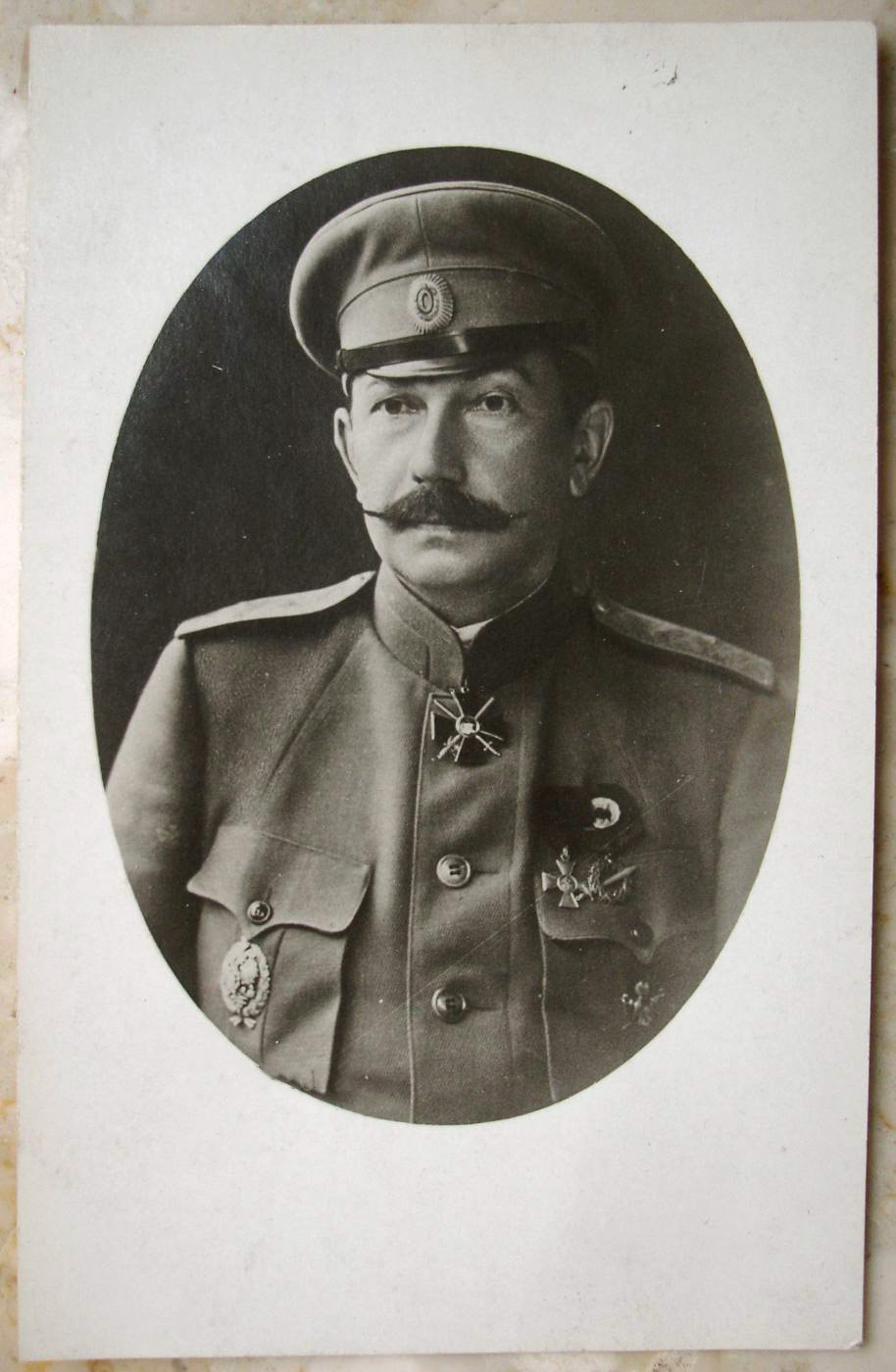
- Born: January 8, 1873; Kamensk-Shakhtinsky, Russian Empire
- Died: October 21, 1934 (aged 61) Paris, France
- Cause of death: Heart attack
- Buried: Sainte-Geneviève-des-Bois Russian Cemetery
- Allegiance: Russian Empire; Don Cossacks
- Branch: Imperial Russian Army (until 1917); Volunteer Army (1918); Don Army (1918–1920)
- Service years: 1892–1920
- Rank: Lieutenant general
- Commands: 4th Mariupol Hussar Regiment; Life Guards of the Unified Cossack Regiment; 1st Trans-Baikal Cossack Division; 1st Guards Cavalry Division; 2nd Brigade of the Volunteer Army; Don Army (as Ataman)
- Conflicts: World War I; Russian Civil War; Ice March
- Awards: St. George's Arms (1914); St. George's Cross IV degree with a laurel branch Order of Prince Danilo I
- Education: Don Cadet Corps, Mykolaiv Cavalry School, Academy of the General Staff
- Other work: Leader of the All-Cossack Union in the West

Afrikan Petrovich Bogaewsky or Bogayevsky (Russian: Африка́н Петро́вич Богае́вский) was a Russian military leader from the Don Cossack noble family of Bogaewsky. He served as a lieutenant general in the Imperial Russian Army, and he also later served as the ataman of the Don Republic.

== Early years ==
Bogaewsky came from a family of hereditary nobles of the Don Army. He was born in the family of Peter Hryhorovych Bogaevskyi, a military sergeant of the Don Army, a member of the Sevastopol defense.

In 1890, Bogaewsky graduated from the Don Cadet Corps. He then studied at the Mykolaiv Cavalry School, which he graduated in 1892 with the first place. In 1892, he was assigned to the Life Guard of the Otamansky Regiment as a cornet.

From 1895 to 1900, he studied at the Academy of the General Staff, from which he graduated with honors. He served in the headquarters of the Guard troops and the St. Petersburg Military District. In December 1908, he received the military rank of colonel. Between 1909 and 1914, he was Chief of Staff of the 2nd Guards Cavalry Division (Russian Empire).

== First World War ==
With the beginning of the First World War, he served at the front as the commander of the 4th Mariupol Hussar Regiment. On November 10, 1914, he was awarded the St. George's Arms for the fact that "in the battles of August 21 near Shapkin and August 28 near Goldan, he energetically participated in the battle, with selfless work, despite obvious danger to himself, significantly contributed to the achievement of success."

On January 1, 1915, he was appointed commander of the Life Guards Unified Cossack Regiment. On March 22, 1915, he received the military rank of major general.

On May 27, 1915, Bogaewsky was enrolled in the Entourage of His Imperial Majesty. From October 4, 1915 to April 1917, he held the post of Chief of Staff of the Acting Ataman of all Cossack troops, Grand Duke Boris Vladimirovich. On April 7, 1917, he was transferred to the position of commander of the 1st Trans-Baikal Cossack Division. At that time, he was awarded the St. George's Cross IV degree with a laurel branch for the battles near Tarnopol.

In the summer of 1917, he was the commander of the 1st Guards Cavalry Division. In August 1917, he was Deputy Chief of Staff of the 4th Cavalry Corps.

== Russian Civil War ==
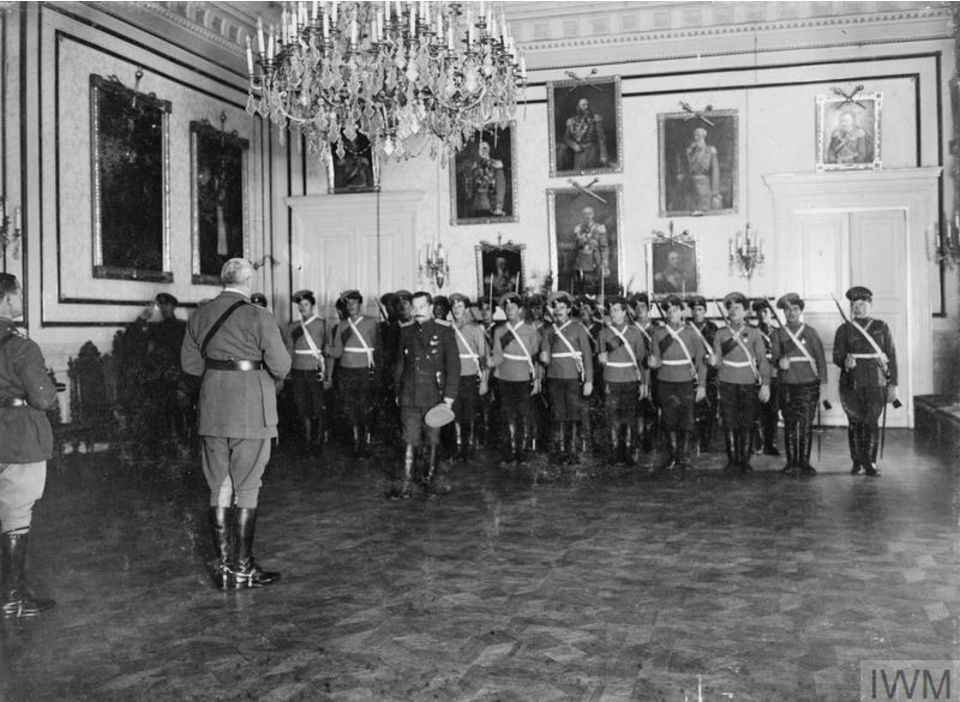
Presentation of an award to General Bogaewsky in Novocherkassk, July 1919

After leaving the 1st Guards Cavalry Division in Kiev, Bogaewsky went to the Don. In the west of the Don region, in the town of Luhansk, Donetsk district, Bogaewsky was arrested by the Bolsheviks. He narrowly escaped being shot and in December 1917 he arrived in the Don capital of Novocherkassk.

After the October Revolution, Bogaewsky joined Lavr Kornilov's Volunteer Army, assuming command of a Cossack regiment. On January 5, 1918, he undertook command of the troops of the Rostov district under the leadership of military chief Alexey Kaledin, who committed suicide a month later after the loss of Rostov-on-Don to the Reds.

After the Ice March in 1918, he joined Pyotr Krasnov's Don Army. In March 1918, Bogaewsky was appointed commander of the 2nd Brigade of the Volunteer Army. From May 1918 to January 1919, he held the position of Chairman of the Council of Heads of Departments and Head of the Department (Minister) of Foreign Relations in the Don Government of Ataman Krasnov. On August 28, 1918, he received the military rank of lieutenant general.

On February 6, 1919, Bogaewsky replaced Krasnov as Ataman of the Don Cossacks, a title he would hold until his death. From January to February 1920, he was the Chairman of the South Russian Government. He fought with Denikin and Wrangel against the Bolsheviks and was evacuated from the Crimea, together with Wrangel, in November 1920.

== Life in exile ==
After leaving Russia he lived in Constantinople, Belgrade, and Sofia, the new Cossack "capital" for the great numbers of Cossacks who had emigrated from the South of Russia. Bogaewsky was an active leader of the exiled Cossacks, helping to form and lead the All-Cossack Union in the West. In 1921, he appealed to emigrant Cossacks to unite in towns and villages according to their place of residence on the Don and to elect their chieftains and village governments. Wrangel's headquarters and the commanders of Cossack units organized military units in the newly formed hamlets and villages.

At the end of 1921 Krasnov, his predecessor as Ataman, appealed to Wrangel with a request to put pressure on Bogaewsky to return the post of Ataman to him, proposing to form a corps of Don, Kuban, and Terek Cossacks to resume hostilities in Russia in the spring of 1922. Wrangel rejected the proposal and supported Bogaewsky. Bogaewsky continued to fended off proposals by Krasnov and others for military operations seeking to restore the monarchy.

Bogaewsky settled in Paris in 1923. He died there of a heart attack on October 21, 1934. He was buried on October 28 in the Sainte-Geneviève-des-Bois Russian Cemetery.

Bogaewsky was awarded the Order of Prince Danilo I and a number of other decorations.

== Writings ==
- Afrikan P. Bogaewsky. Ice March 1918. Published in New York. 1963.

== See also ==
- Russian Civil War
