= Vasiliy Pokotilo =

Russian Governor-general

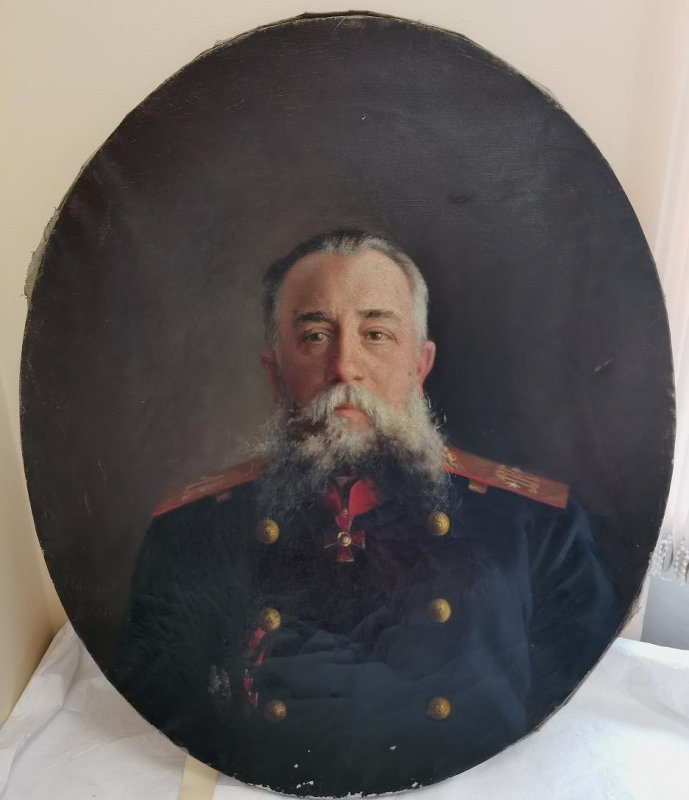

Vasiliy Ivanovich Pokotilo (Василий Иванович Покотило; 8 August 1856 – 27 March 1919) was Governor general of Russian Turkestan from 1910 to 1911.
