= Efremov family =

Russian noble family

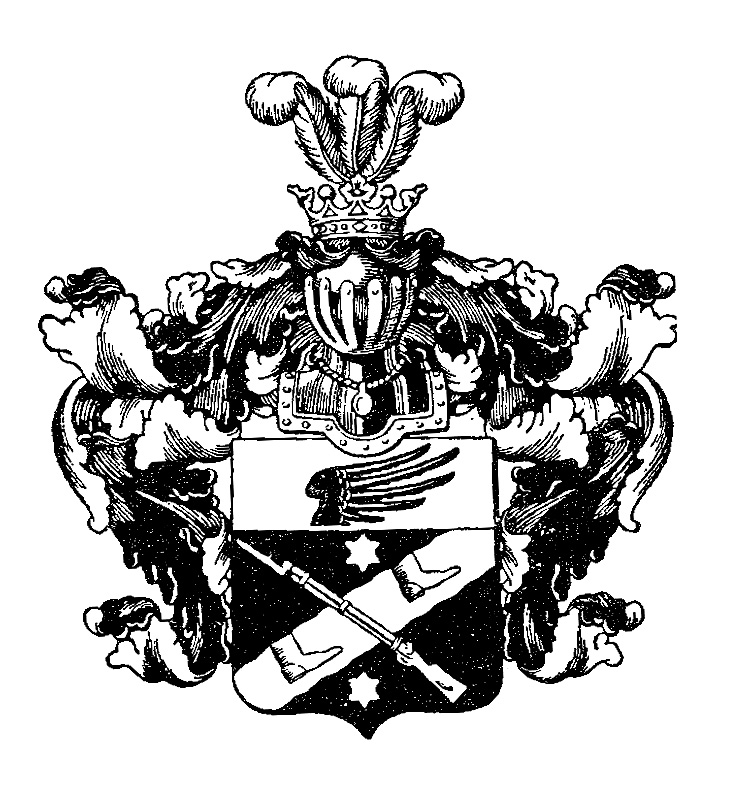
Coat of arms of the Efremov family

The Efremov family (Russian: Ефремов, sometimes transliterated as Yefremov) were a Russian noble family of Don Cossacks origin.

== History ==
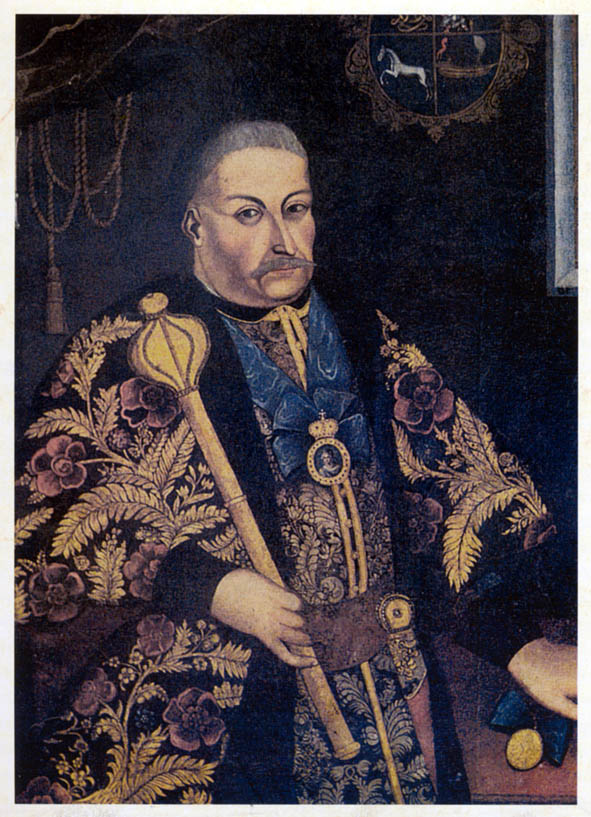
Efremov Danila

Earliest reference date back to 1670, with Efrem Petrov from the area of Oryol being the oldest of known ancestors. He went to Cherkassk around 1670 as a merchant, and was an Ataman of Don Cossacks in 1702–1705. He was murdered by Kondraty Bulavin during the Bulavin Rebellion. Efremov were among the most prominent and rich families of the Don Cossack Host.

== Notable members ==
- Danielo Efremov (? — 1760) — Ataman of Don Cassacks in 1738 - 1753. Danielo was a Don Cossacks Military Ataman in the Great Northern War and the Seven Years' War
- Stepan Efremov (? — 1774) — Ataman of Don Cassacks in 1753 - 1772.
