= Second Cadet Corps =

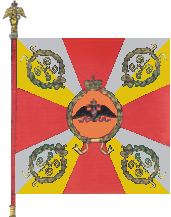
- Banner
- Active: 1719; 1918
- Allegiance: Russian Empire
- Branch: Imperial Russian Army
- Type: Military academy

Insignia
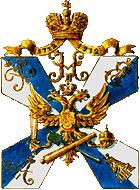
- Standard

Second Emperor Peter the Great Cadet Corps (Russian: 2-й кадетский Императора Петра Великого корпус) known as the Second Cadet Corps (Russian: Второй кадетский корпус) was a military educational institution of the Russian Empire, located in Saint Petersburg.

== History ==
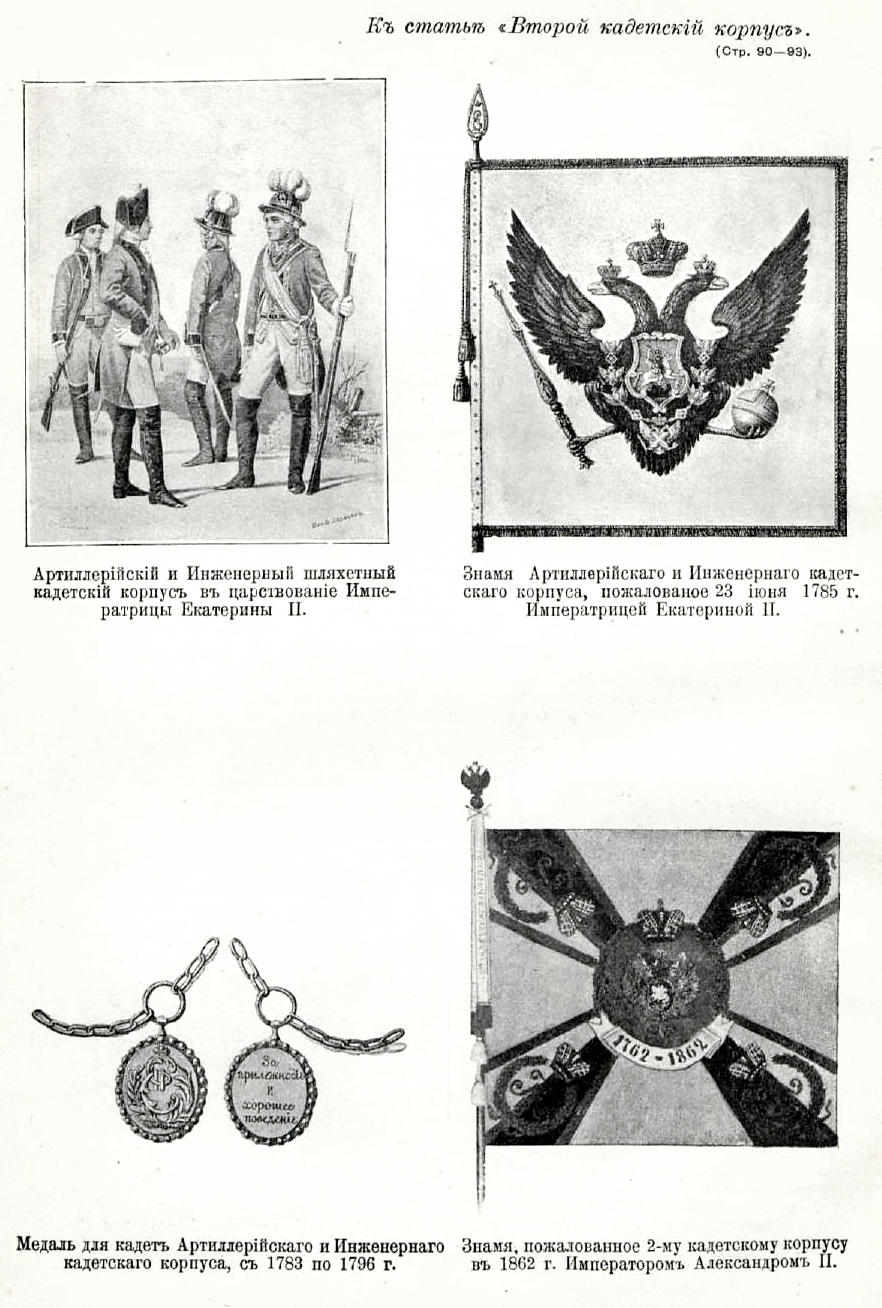
Drawings from the article "The Second Cadet Corps of Emperor Peter the Great" ("Sytin's Military Encyclopedia")

In 1701, buildings with a tower for the Cannon School were built in the new cannon yard of the Pushkarsky Prikaz in Moscow.

In 1712, by Decree of Peter I No. 2467 of January 16, it was decreed: “To expand the engineering school, namely: to find a master from among the Russians who would teach numbers, or to send him to the tower for this teaching; and when they finish Arithmetic, to teach Geometry as much as is necessary before engineering, and then to give it to the Engineer to teach Fortification.”

In 1719, by Decree of Peter I of March 17 No. 3330, the students of the Moscow Engineering School were transferred to St. Petersburg to the Engineer Company formed there.

In 1731, the St. Petersburg Artillery School was formed at the Foundry Yard in St. Petersburg with a staff of 60 students. The school was divided into "arithmetic and other sciences" (which in turn was divided into verbal science, arithmetic and geometric classes) and "drawing".

In 1733, the Engineering School was located in wooden buildings on a site owned by Burkhard Christoph von Münnich, and then the office of the main artillery and fortification, on the bank of the Zhdanovka River.

In 1738, a third of the students of the St. Petersburg school were transferred to Moscow to the new Engineering School.

In 1758, by the Decree of Empress Elizabeth of May 12, the Engineering and Artillery schools were combined into one, which was named the Artillery and Engineering Gentry (Noble) School. The engineer-captain M. I. Mordvinov was appointed the head of the gentry school.

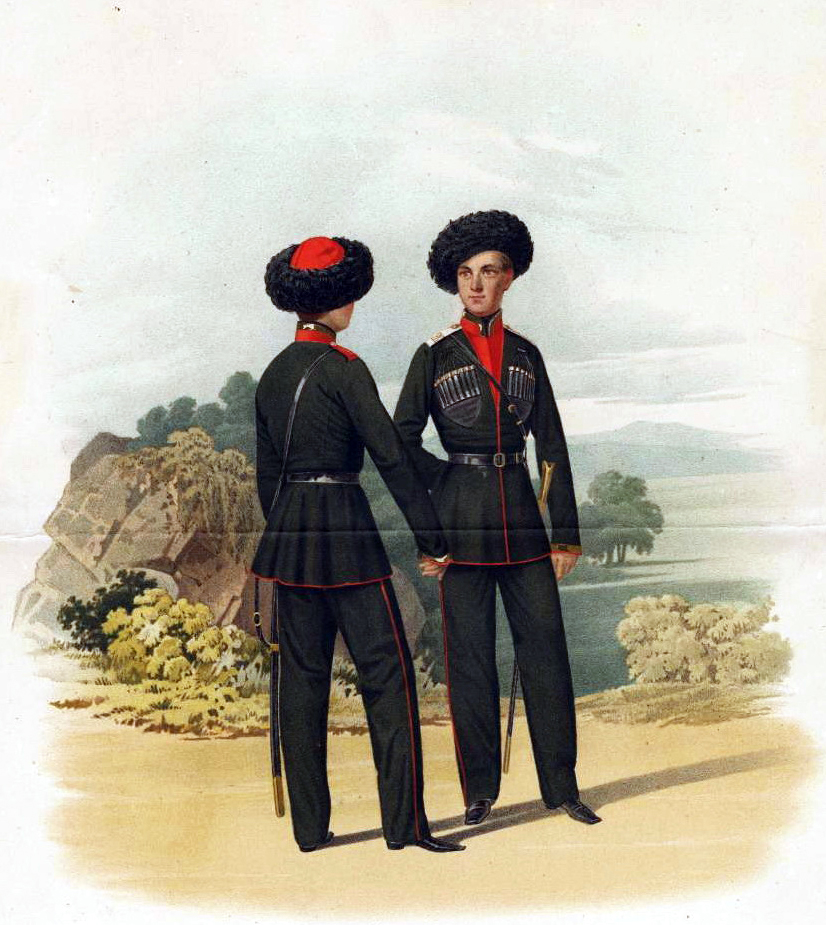
Piratsky K.K. Pupils from the highlanders of the 1st and 2nd Cadet Corps. 1855.

In 1762, by the Decree of Catherine II of October 25, the Artillery and Engineering Gentry (Noble) School was transformed into the Artillery and Engineering Gentry Cadet Corps.

In 1800, on March 10, the Decree of Paul I "On the naming of the Artillery and Engineering Cadet Corps the 2nd Cadet Corps" was issued. In its structure, it was close to the First Cadet Corps; training in these two educational institutions began to be carried out according to a single program.

On March 14, 1807, the Volunteer (Volunteer) Corps was created at the 2nd Cadet Corps, renamed in 1808 as the Noble Regiment at the 2nd Cadet Corps; On January 1, 1832, it was separated from the 2nd Cadet Corps and became an independent military educational institution.

In the 1810s, recruits from the Lubny Hussar, Polish, Lithuanian and Tatar Uhlan Regiments were trained as cadets, in the St. Petersburg Noble Cavalry Squadron of the 2nd Cadet Corps, who were of various ages, from twelve-year-old boys to sixty-year-old old men, there were people who had St. George's Crosses for the Patriotic War. The inconvenience of living together under such conditions was not slow to become apparent and caused the need to sort the cadets by age and ability, and after removing the unsuitable element, the remaining ones formed a horse squadron and a foot detachment awaiting promotion to the first officer rank.

On May 17, 1863, the 2nd Cadet Corps was reorganized into the 2nd Military Gymnasium. In 1865, two-year Higher Pedagogical Courses were created with the aim of training teachers for military gymnasiums of the Russian Empire; on June 22, 1882, the 2nd Military Gymnasium was transformed into the 2nd Cadet Corps.

In 1912, by the Supreme Order of the Ministry of War of January 16 For long-term and fruitful activity the 2nd Cadet Corps was given the name of Emperor Peter the Great, the Chief's code on the shoulder straps and a special chest badge.

After the October Revolution, the Russian Civil War, the Association of Cadets of the 2nd Emperor Peter the Great Cadet Corps, numbering 57 people, was established in France, headed by Major General Nechvolodov.

Currently, the buildings of the Second Cadet Corps (Krasnogo Kursanta Street, houses No. 16, No. 18) house the A.F. Mozhaysky Military-Space Academy.
