= Ivan Andreyevich Argamakov =

Russian commander

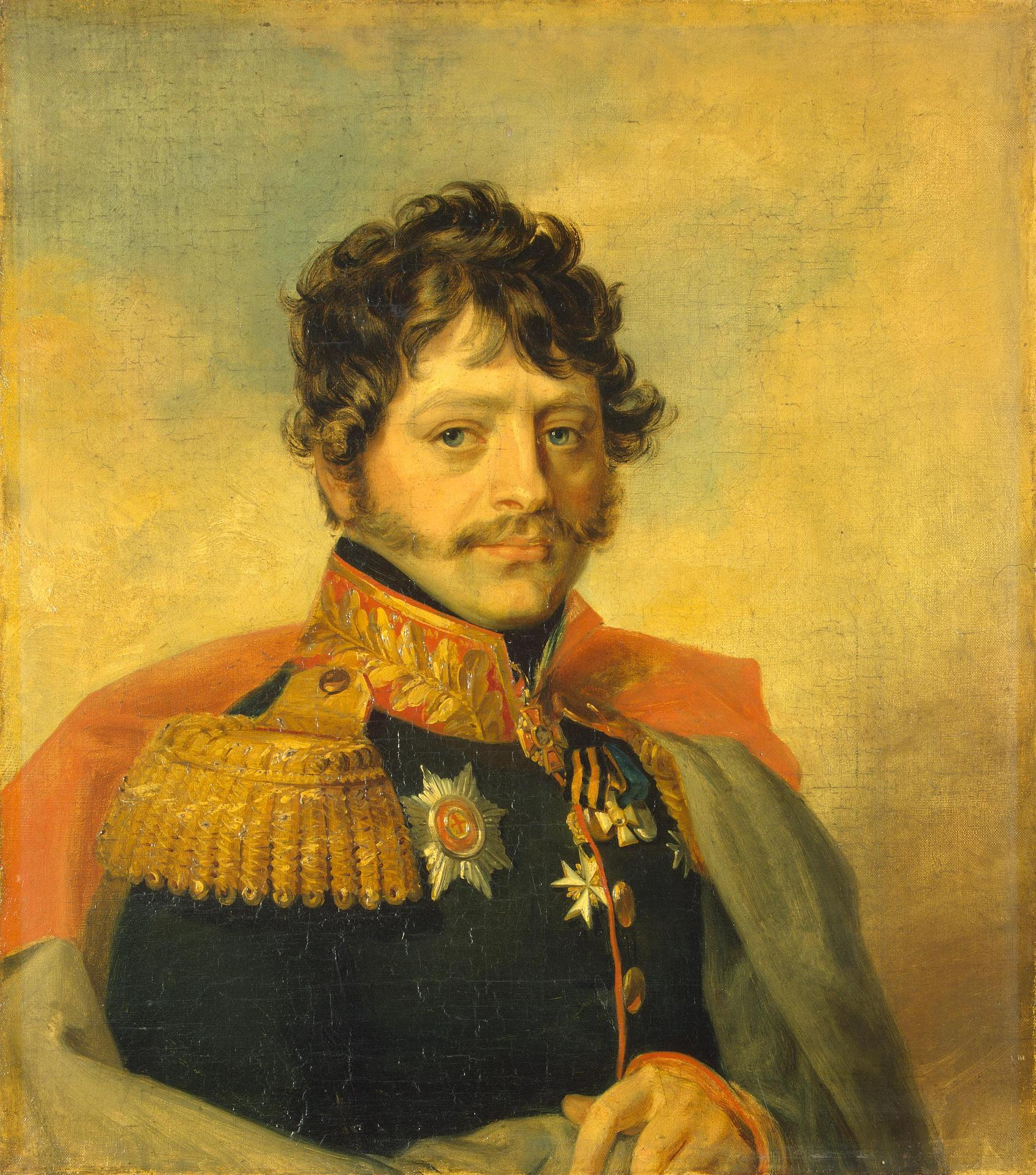
Portrait of Argamakov by George Dawe (Military Gallery of the Winter Palace)

Ivan Andreyevich Argamakov (Russian: Иван Андреевич Аргамаков; 15 December 1775, Osokino, Kostroma – 9 March 1820) was a commander of the Imperial Russian Army during the Napoleonic Wars. His final rank was major general, to which he was promoted in 1813.

== Life ==
From a noble family in the Kostroma province, he studied in a nobles-only infantry corps. On 25 June 1793, at the rank of poroutchik (lieutenant), he was attached to the 10th Ingermanlandski Hussar Regiment. On 31 July 1794, beneath the walls of Vilna, he received a baptism of fire in a battle between Russia and the Polish–Lithuanian Commonwealth. He was promoted to captain the same year. On 2 December 1805, in the 16th Tver Dragoon Regiment, he fought at the battle of Austerlitz. On 29 June 1806, now commander of the same regiment, he fought in Moldavia and Wallachia. He also distinguished himself in the Russo-Turkish War, notably in the siege of Brailov.

On 12 December 1807 he was promoted to colonel and on 4 April 1810 made commander in chief of the Jytomyr Dragoons. He was still in that regiment in 1812 when he was incorporated into the 16th Brigade of 5th Division of the 3rd Reserve Reconnaissance Cavalry Corps under the command of general Charles de Lambert. He distinguished himself in the capture of Minsk and Barysaw. After distinguishing himself at the battle of Berezina, he pursued Napoleon's troops from the River Berezina to the Neman between 29 November and 14 December 1812. Near Vilna, he defeated a Napoleonic detachment under a Polish general. He also took part in the defeat of the French near the village Ponary in November 1812, ending the Russian campaign. For his bravery he was granted the Order of St George 4th class on 4 August 1813. 1813 also saw him awarded the Order of St Vladimir 3rd class and the Order of Saint Anne 1st class.

From 22 January to 29 December 1813, during the siege of Danzig, he took part in the battles of Königswartha (19 May 1813), Bautzen (21 May 1813), and Leipzig (16 – 19 October 1813). He showed great courage and was rewarded with the Order of Saint Anne 1st class. On 15 September 1813 he was promoted to major general. He also took part in the 1814 siege of Hamburg, held by the French general Louis Nicolas Davout. In 1815 he commanded various brigades in the 3rd division of the Uhlan regiment garrisoning the Ukraine. On 14 February 1820 he was put in command of the 1st brigade of the 3rd division of a dragoon regiment. Over the course of his career he was also awarded the Order of St John of Jerusalem and the silver medal commemorating the 'patriotic war' of 1812.
