= Bogaewsky family =

Noble Don Cossack family

Domontowicz coat of arms, used by the Bogaewsky family

The Bogaewsky or Bogayevsky family (Russian: Богаевские, romanized: Bogayevskiye) was the name of noble family of Don Cossacks who originated from the stanitsa of Kamenskaya. The family used the Domontowicz coat of arms.

== Notable members ==
- Afrikan Petrovich Bogaewsky (1872–1934), was a Lieutenant General of Russian Imperial Army and Don Host Ataman.
- Mitrofan Petrovich Bogaewsky (1881–1918), was a Russian writer and historian. Killed by Bolsheviks on April 1, 1918.
