= Dmitri Kutejnikov =

General of the Russian Imperial Army

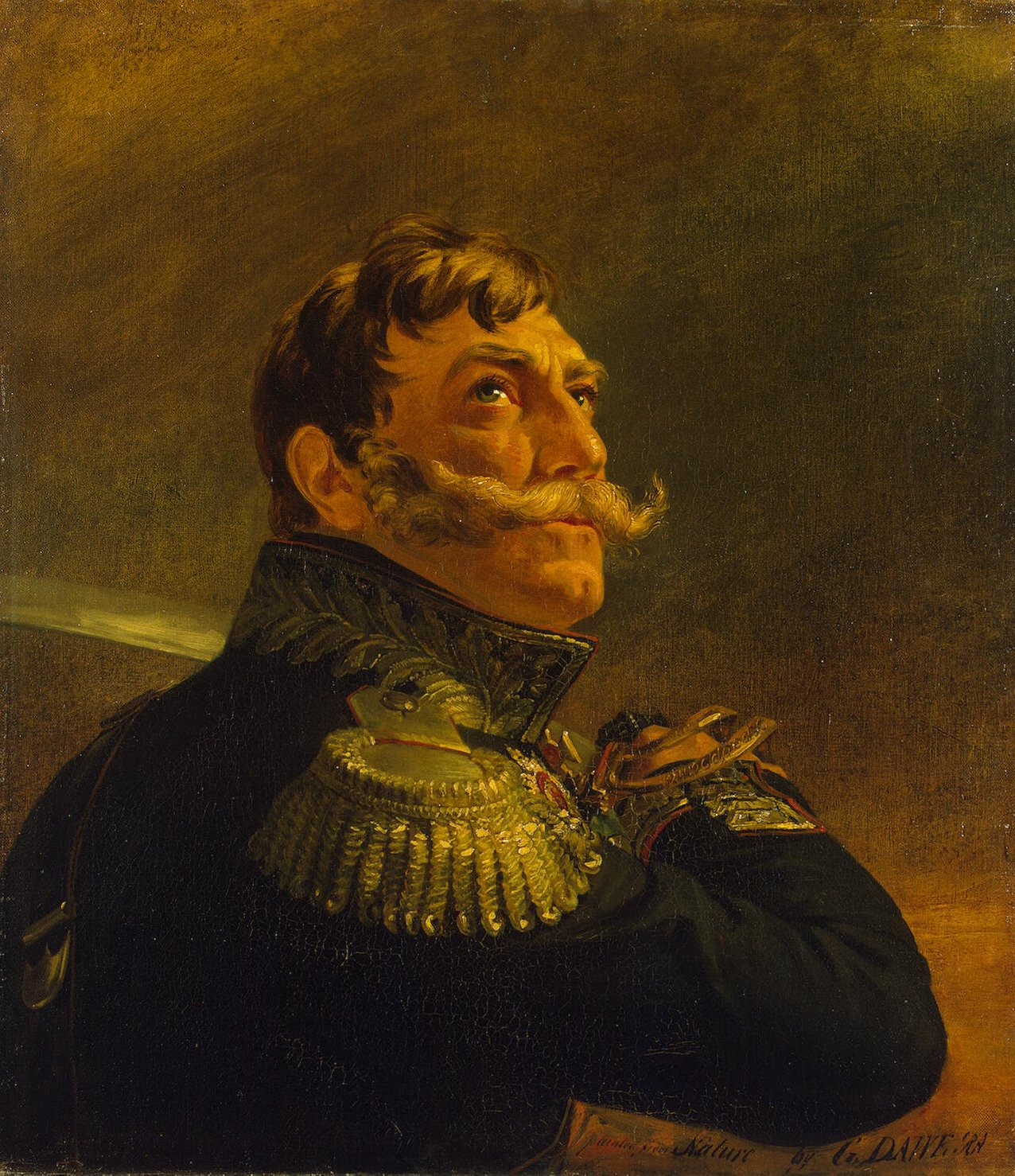
Portrait by George Dawe

Dmitri Kutejnikov (Russian: Дмитрий Ефимович Кутейников; 1766–1844), born into a Don Cossacks noble family and was a Russian full general in time of Napoleonic Wars. He was a hero of Battle of Kinburn (1787). Kuteinikov served in wars against French Empire and Ottoman Empire, was in a Russian expedition to India in 1800. In Patriotic War of 1812 was at Borodino, Battle of Maloyaroslavets and Battle of Berezina.
