= Vasily Orlov-Denisov =

Russian Cossack general (1775–1843)

Count Vasily Orlov-Denisov
- Василий Васильевич Орлов-Денисов
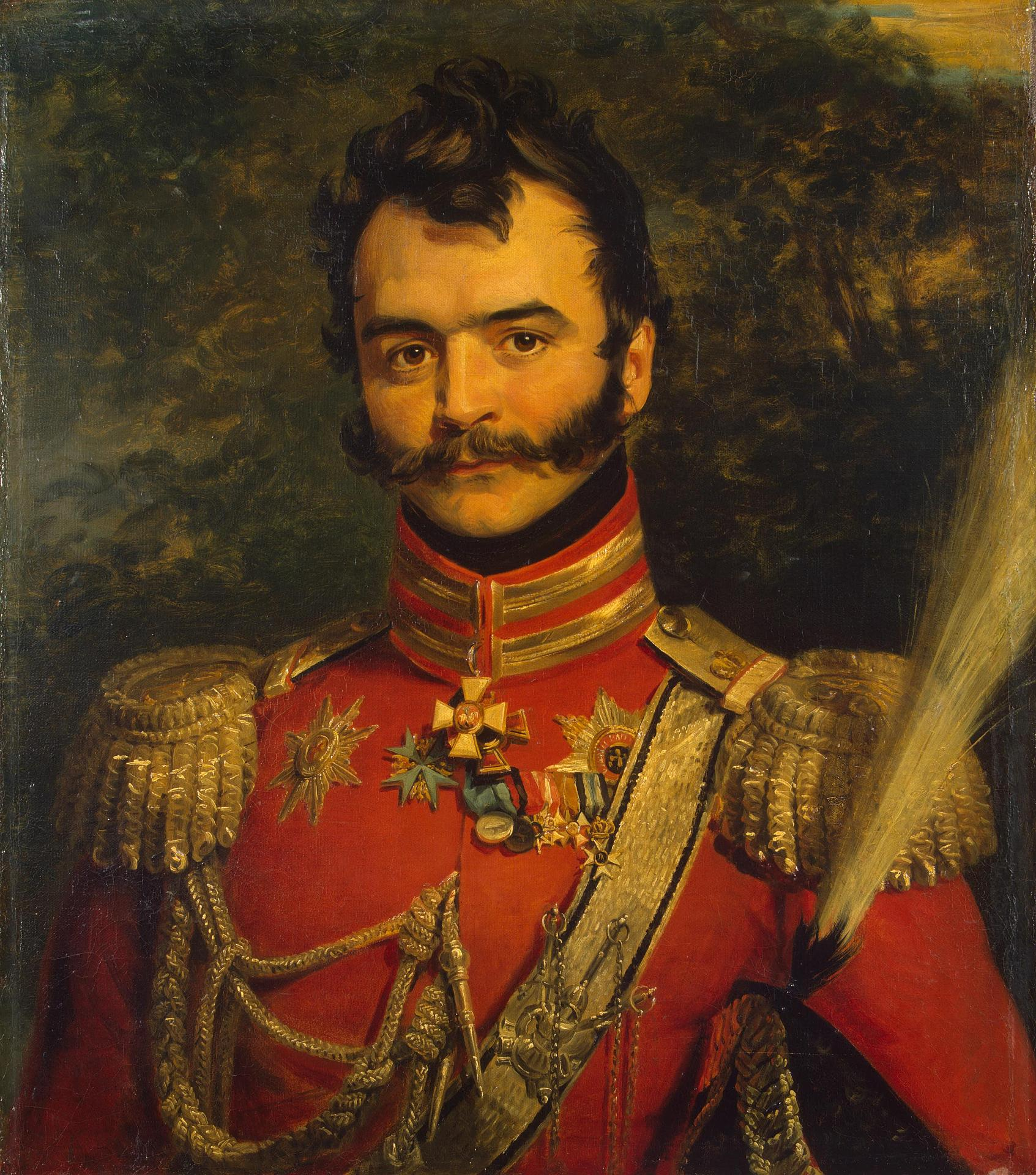
- Portrait by George Dawe (1820–1825)
- Born: 8 September 1775; Patiizbyansky, Don Cossack Host, Russian Empire
- Died: 24 January 1843 (aged 67); Kharkov, Kharkov Governorate, Russian Empire
- Relatives: Orlov-Denisov family
- Military career
- Allegiance: Russia
- Branch: Imperial Russian Army
- Service years: 1789–1821
- Rank: General of the Cavalry
- Conflicts: Russo-Turkish War (1787–1792); Kościuszko Uprising; War of the Fourth Coalition; French invasion of Russia; Battle of Tarutino; Battle of Liaskowa; Battle of Krasnoi

Count Vasily Vasilyevich Orlov-Denisov (Russian: Василий Васильевич Орлов-Денисов; 8 September 1775 – 24 January 1843) was a Russian Cossack general. He was the son of Vasily Petrovich Orlov, the ataman of the Don Cossacks, and grandson (on his mother's side) of the first Cossack count, Fyodor Petrovich Denisov. In honour of his grandfather, he added his surname to his own, becoming Orlov-Denisov on 26 April 1801.

Vasily Orlov-Denisov is not to be confused with Vasily "Vas'ka" Denisov, who appears as a fictional character in Leo Tolstoy's novel War and Peace. Tolstoy has said the similarity in names was a mistake on his part, arising from the "specially typical character" of Orlov-Denisov. He insisted that "nothing resembling the actual facts of [Orlov-Denisov's] life is ascribed to [Vas'ka Denisov] in the novel."
