= Patiizbyansky =

Patiizbyansky Пятиизбянский
- Khutor
- Location within Volgograd Oblast Location within Russia
- Coordinates: 48°35′N 43°27′E
- Country: Russia
- Region: Volgograd Oblast
- District: Kalachyovsky District
- Time zone: UTC+4:00

Patiizbyansky (Russian: Пятиизбянский) is a rural locality (a khutor) and the administrative center of Pyatiizbyanskoye Rural Settlement, Kalachyovsky District, Volgograd Oblast, Russia. The population was 730 as of 2010. There are 5 streets.

== Geography ==
Patiizbyansky is located 27 km southwest of Kalach-na-Donu (the district's administrative centre) by road. Morskoy is the nearest rural locality.
