= Berthold I =

Berthold I may refer to:

- Berthold I, Duke of Swabia (c. 1060–1090)
- Berthold I of Istria (c. 1110/1122–1188)
- Berthold I, Count of Tyrol (died 1180)
