= Kreis (Habsburg monarchy) =

Administrative division of Austria (1748–1867)

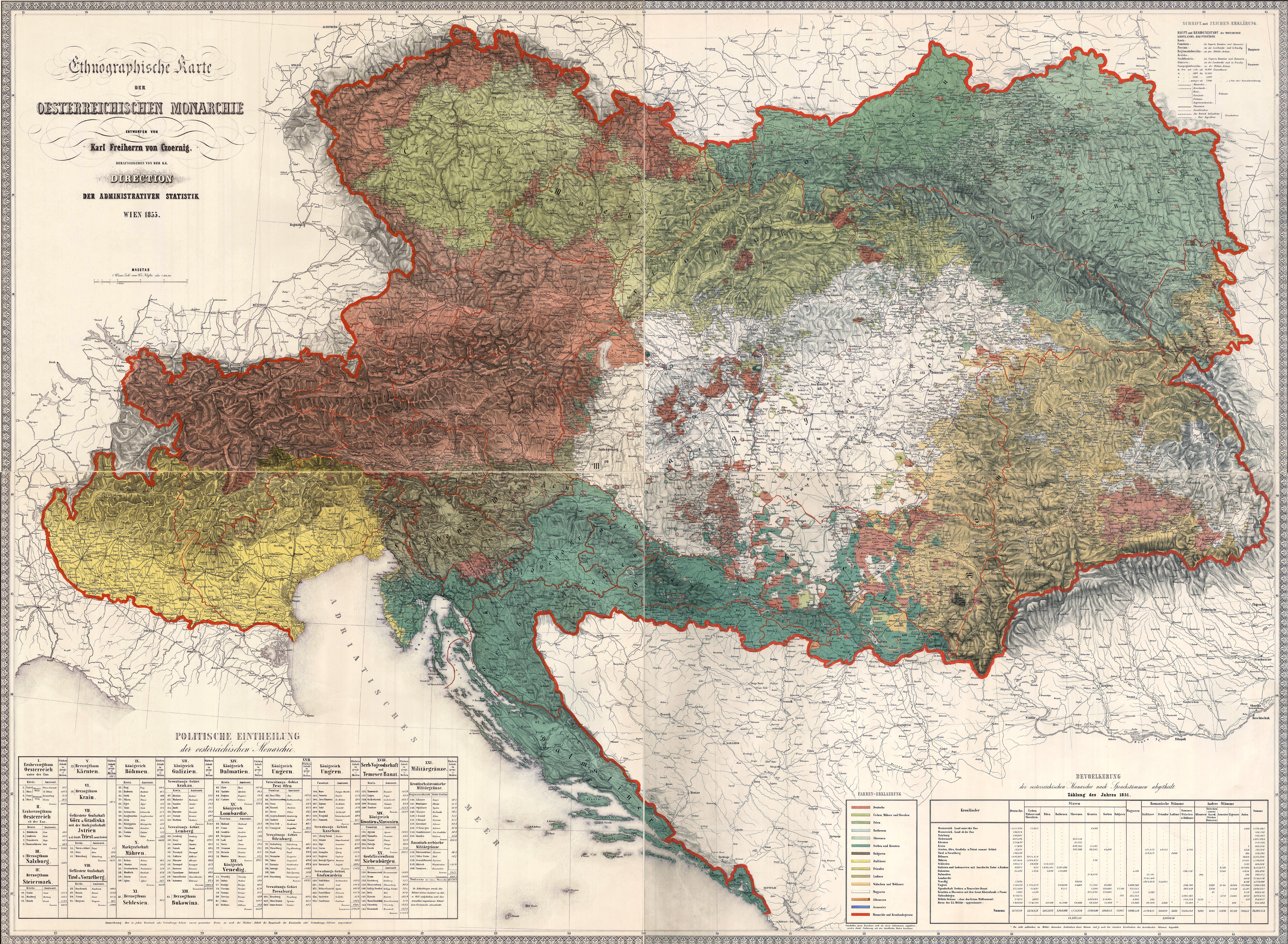
Ethnographic map of the Austrian Empire c. 1855 which also shows the boundaries of the crown lands and Kreise.

A Kreis (pl. Kreise) or 'Circle' was an administrative division of the Habsburg monarchy and Austrian Empire between 1748 and 1867.

== History ==
=== Creation ===
After the Prussian annexation of the bulk of Silesia following the First and Second Silesian Wars, it became apparent that Frederick II's administrative structures allowed him to take much higher tax revenues from the area. Therefore, in the years following end of the War of the Austrian Succession in 1748, Maria Theresa and Joseph II enacted several administrative reforms with Prussia as a model, and the old territorial divisions were converted into new Kreise. These reforms were carried out by Maria Theresa's advisor Count Friedrich Wilhelm von Haugwitz and continued under chancellor Prince Wenzel Anton von Kaunitz-Rietberg from 1760. The bureaucratisation in the form of Kreisämtern ('circle offices', sing. Kreisamt) lessened the influence of the estates by essentially separating them from the administration of the realms.

The origin of the Kreis as a unit of administration lay in Bohemia, where Kraje (Kreise in German) had existed as territorial units since the 14th century (see Bohemia § Historical administrative divisions). Through the reform the system was further developed and applied to the Habsburgs' other realms (other than Hungary). In the Archduchy of Austria and Duchy of Styria the old quarters (German: Viertel) served as a basis for the new Kreise (Waldviertel, Mostviertel, Industrieviertel and Weinviertel in Lower Austria; Innviertel, Hausruckviertel, Mühlviertel, and Traunviertel in Upper Austria; Quarter division of Styria 1462).

The Hungarian counterparts were the Comitatus (German: Gespanschaften or Komitate, formerly spelled Comitate; Hungarian: Vármegyék), which had existed for much longer and were dominated by the nobility.

In Lombardy–Venetia (1815–1859/66) there were "delegations", which gave rise to the later Provinces.

=== After 1848 ===
The Amtsbezirke ('office districts'), or more precisely the Bezirksämter ('district offices'), created in the reforms which followed the Revolutions of 1848 (specifically those of 1849 and 1853), largely took over the responsibilities of the Kreisämter.

These were proposed as early as 1849 by Interior Minister Alexander von Bach as part of a necessary reform to the administrative apparatus to deal with the increase in the number citizens interacting with the offices following the final abolition of serfdom in 1848. The Kreis administrations were thereby subdivided into subordinate Amtsbezirke. Some smaller Kreise were abolished or merged. The Kreis system was also expanded to the Voivodeship of Serbia and Banat of Temeschwar (formerly part of southern Hungary) and the Grand Principality of Transylvania in the course of these reforms.

The statutory cities were also excluded from Kreis administration, much like they are excluded from the modern districts (Bezirke).

=== Abolition ===
With the creation of the political districts (Bezirke) in 1868, which go back to the December Constitution of 1867, the Kreis divisions were abolished and replaced with much more finely divided Bezirk divisions; however, the newly created district commissions (Bezirkshauptmannschaften) were strongly influenced by the former Kreis administrations.

== Organisation ==
With the Kreisämtern there was for the first time a level of administration between the manors and free cities and the Imperial Court (in the crown lands the gubernatorial administration). At the head of every Kreis was a Kreishauptmann (roughly 'circle/district captain/head'; see Hauptmann), whose officials were entrusted with clearly defined tasks, which significantly disempowered the estates in financial matters. The Kreisämter were the lowest level of political administration. This brought together direct oversight of taxation, as well as the conscription and recruitment system, the supervision of schools and poorhouses, the supervision of the individual municipalities and the protection of the peasants before the manor lords. The captains were obliged to travel to the Kreise at least once per year or allow the inspectors to visit. For this the captains received a state salary, but were not allowed to hold any other lordly or stately offices and were bound to their instructions.

The Kreisämtern were subordinate to the Gubernia (the administrative bodies of the crown lands, roughly governorates).

== Legacy ==
Despite numerous reforms, the borders of the Kreise are still roughly visible in the 39 Austrian electoral districts. Also the divisions (Sprengel) of the district courts (Kreisgerichte; now regional courts – Landesgerichte) are essentially equivalent to those of the former Kreisämter. The 35 NUTS 3 regions are loosely aligned with the former Kreis divisions.

== List of Kreise ==
The following is a list of the Kreise and statutory cities in the non-Hungarian lands of the Austrian Empire (Cisleithania in later terminology) c. 1854; pre-1848 Kreise are also listed where applicable.

=== Lands of the Bohemian Crown ===
==== Kingdom of Bohemia ====
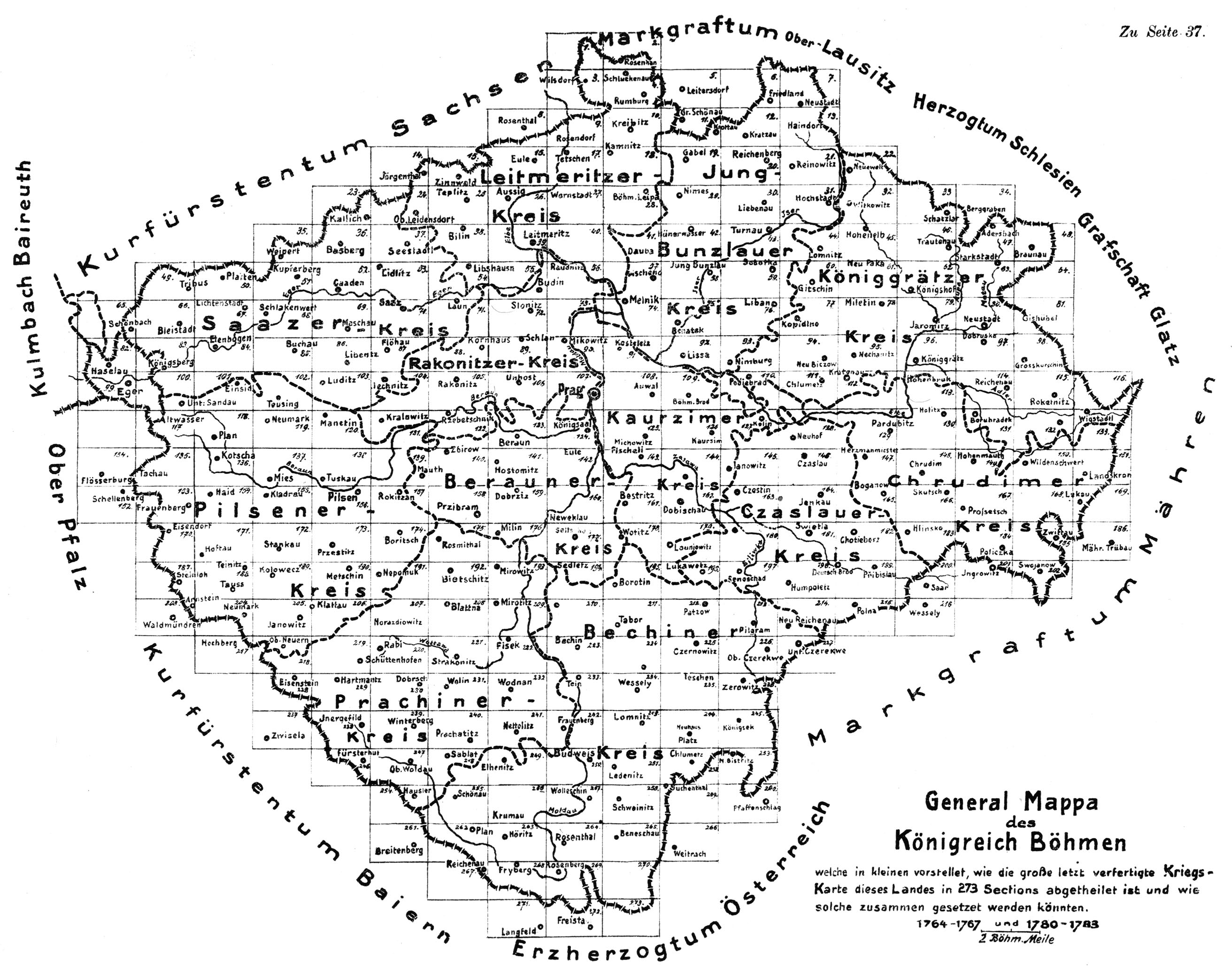
Overview map of Bohemia from the Josephinian Land Survey (c. 1764–83) showing the Kreise

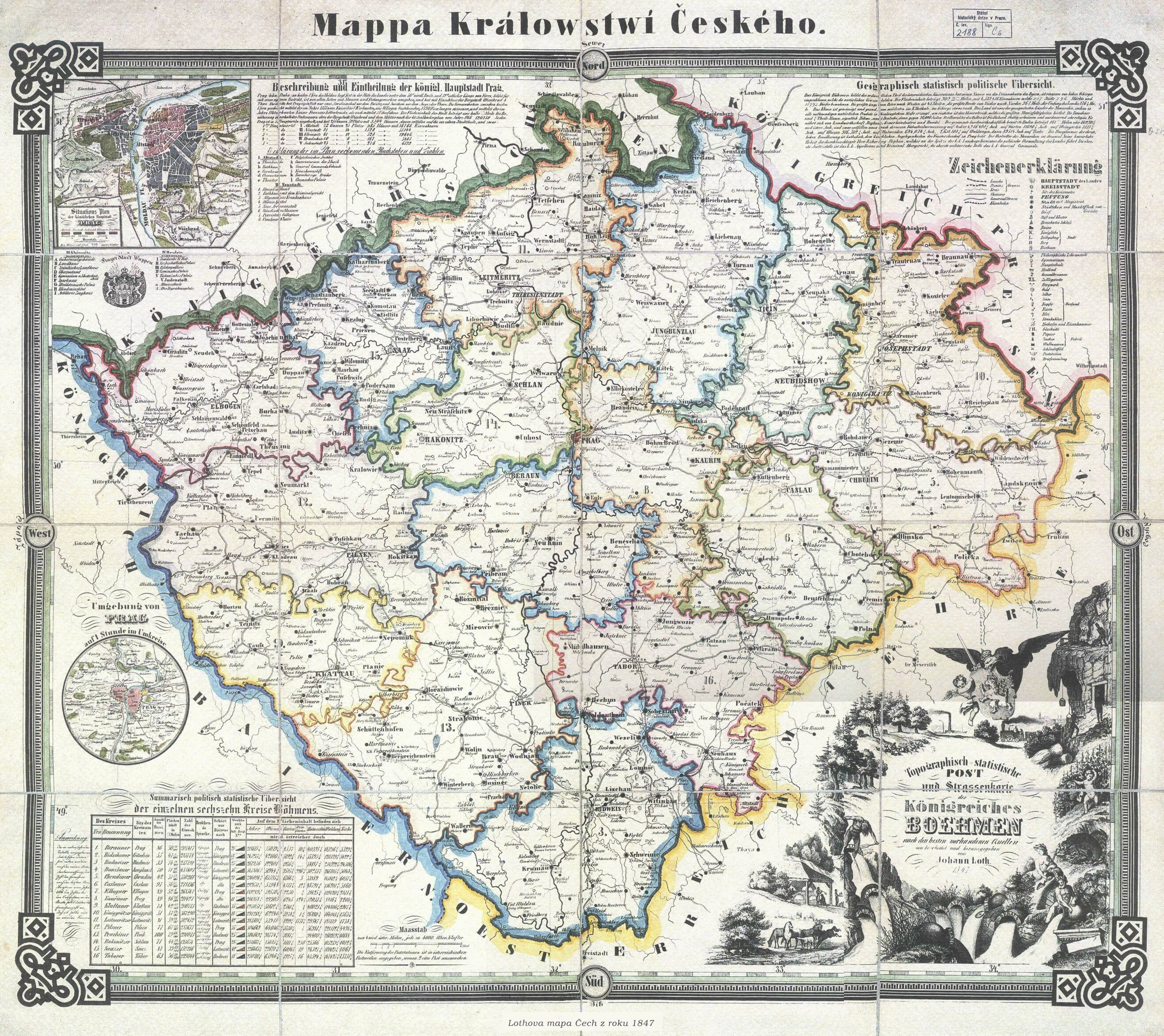
Kreise of Bohemia c. 1847

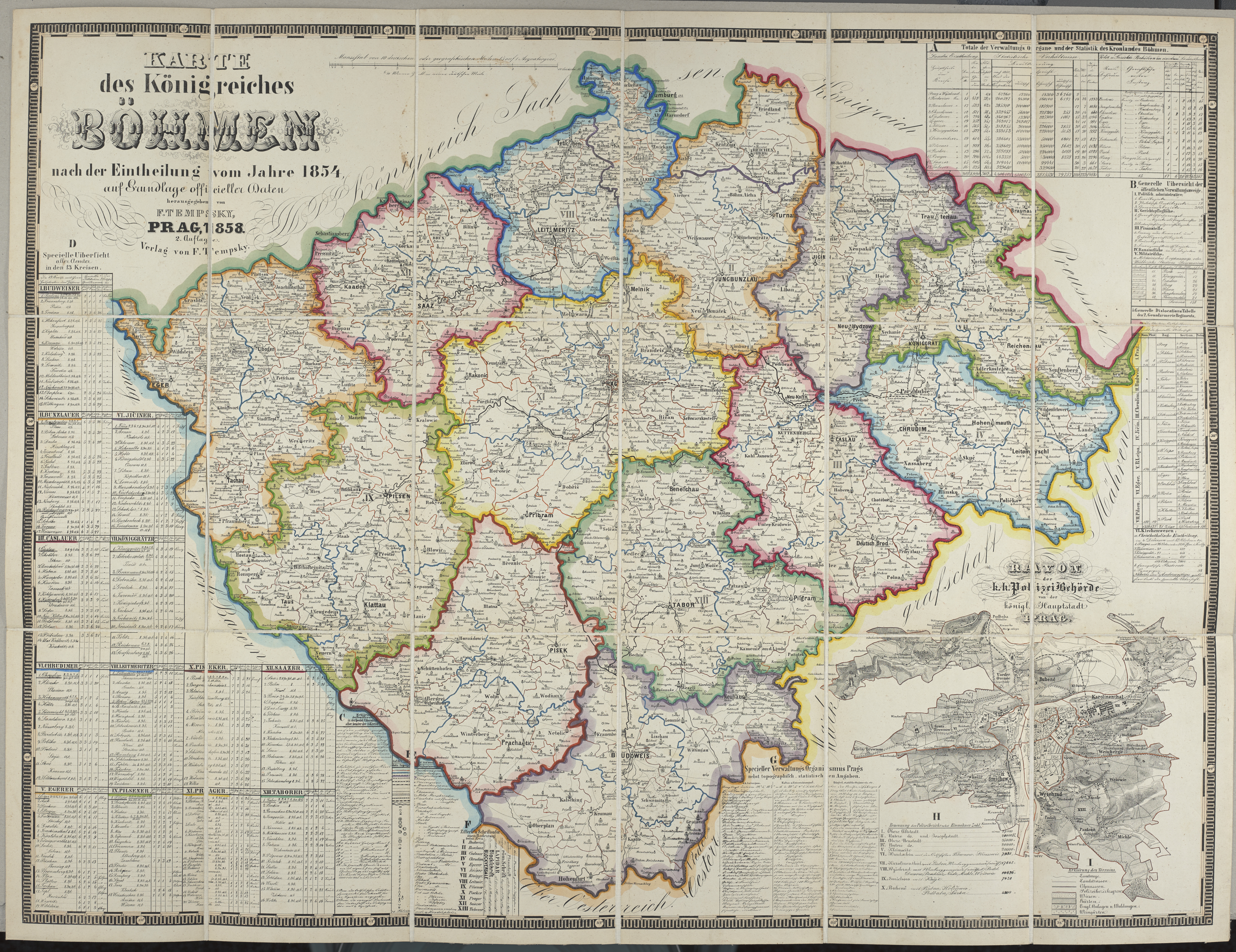
Kreise of Bohemia from 1854

Name		Seat/administrative centre	Notes
German	Czech	Seat/administrative centre	Notes
Prag	Praha	itself (Prague)	Statutory city
Kreis Prag, Prager Kreis	Pražský kraj	Prague	formed in 1849 from Rakonitzer Kreis and parts of Berauner, Bunzlauer and Kaurimer Kreise
Kreis Beraun or Berauner Kreis	Berounský kraj	Beroun; Kreisamt in Prague	abolished in 1849; divided between the Prager and Taborer Kreise
Kreis Kaurim/Kaurzim or Kaur(z)imer Kreis	Kouřimský kraj	Kouřim; Kreisamt in Prague	abolished in 1849; mostly divided between the Prager and Taborer Kreise, with some areas passing to the Caslauer Kreis
Kreis Rakonitz or Rakonitzer Kreis	Rakovnický kraj	Rakonitz/Rakovník	abolished in 1849
Kreis Budweis or Budweiser Kreis	Budějovický kraj	Budweis/České Budějovice	
Kreis Bunzlau or Bunzlauer Kreis	Boleslavský kraj	Jung-Bunzlau/Mladá Boleslav	Kreisgerichte ('circle/district courts') 1854: Jung-Bunzlau, Reichenberg; City of Reichenberg (Liberec; Stadtbezirk subordinate to Bunzlauer Kreis)
Kreis Chrudim or Chrudimer Kreis	Chrudimský kraj	Chrudim	
Kreis Časlau, Kreis Czaslau or Časlauer/Czaslauer Kreis	Čáslavský kraj	Czaslau/Čáslav	
Kreis Eger or Egerer Kreis	Chebský kraj	Eger/Cheb	established in 1849 from Elbogener Kreis and part of Pilsner Kreis
Kreis Elbogen or Elbogner Kreis	Loketský kraj	Elbogen/Loket	became Egerer Kreis in 1849
Kreis Gitschin, Gitschiner Kreis or Jičiner Kreis	Jičínský kraj	Gitschin/Jičín	established in 1849 from Bidschower Kreis
Kreis Bidschow or Bidschower Kreis	Bydžovský kraj	Bidschow/Nový Bydžov	became Gitschiner Kreis in 1849
Kreis Königgrätz or Königgrätzer Kreis	Hradecký kraj	Königgrätz/Hradec Králové	
Kreis Leitmeritz or Leitmeritzer Kreis	Litoměřický kraj	Litoměřice	Kreisgerichte ('circle/district courts') 1854: Leitmeritz, Böhmisch-Leipa
Kreis Pilsen or Pilsner Kreis	Plzeňský kraj	Plzeň	in 1849 absorbed Klattauer Kreis
Kreis Pisek or Piseker Kreis		Písek	established in 1849 from Prachiner Kreis
Kreis Prachin or Prachiner Kreis	Prácheňský kraj or Prácheňsko	Prácheň Castle	became Piseker Kreis in 1849
Kreis Saaz or Saazer Kreis	Žatecký kraj	Saaz/Žatec	
Kreis Tábor or Tabórer Kreis	Táborský kraj	Tábor	
Kreis Klattau or Klattauer Kreis	Klatovský kraj	Klattau/Klatovy	abolished in 1849 (absorbed into Pilsner Kreis)

The Kreise in Bohemia were abolished in 1862 (enacted 23 October, effective 31 October).

===== 1849–54 =====
Map showing the seven Kreise of Bohemia c. 1850

In the 1849 administrative reforms which followed the Revolutions of 1848 and introduced the first political districts (Bezirkshaupmannschaften), the Kreise of Bohemia were reduced to seven:

- City of Prague
- Prager Kreis – 8 political districts:
  - Smichow
  - Eule
  - Carolinenthal
  - Rakonitz
  - Schlan
  - Melnik
  - Przibram
  - Horzowic
- Budweiser Kreis – 9 political districts:
  - Budweis
  - Krumau
  - Kaplitz
  - Neuhaus
  - Tabor
  - Mühlhausen
  - Pilgram
  - Beneschau
  - Wotitz
- Pardubitzer Kreis – 11 political districts:
  - Pardubitz
  - Kolin
  - Schwarz-Kosteletz
  - Kuttenberg
  - Ledetsch
  - Deutsch-Brod
  - Chotieborg
  - Chrudim
  - Hohenmauth
  - Leitomischl
  - Landskron
- Gitschiner Kreis – 16 political districts:
  - Gitschin
  - Königgrätz
  - Königinhof
  - Trautenau
  - Braunau
  - Reichenau
  - Senftenberg
  - Neustadt
  - Horzic
  - Hohenelbe
  - Podiebrad
  - Neubidschow
  - Turnau
  - Semil
  - Jungbunzlau
  - Nimburg
- Böhmisch-Leippaer Kreis – 10 political districts:
  - Böhmisch-Leippa
  - Reichenberg
  - Friedland
  - Gabel
  - Tetschen
  - Außig
  - Schlukenau
  - Rumburg
  - Dauba
  - Leitmeritz
- Egerer Kreis – 12 political districts:
  - Eger
  - Falkenau
  - Plan
  - Tachau
  - Carlsbad
  - Luditz
  - Graßlitz
  - Joachimsthal
  - Saaz
  - Kaaden
  - Brüx
  - Teplitz
- Pilsner Kreis – 13 political districts:
  - Pilsen
  - Rokitzan
  - Kralowitz
  - Klattau
  - Przestiz
  - Bischofteinitz
  - Tauß
  - Schüttenhofen
  - Winterberg
  - Prachatitz
  - Pisek
  - Strakinitz
  - Brzeznitz

These Kreise lasted until the reforms of 1853/54.

==== Margraviate of Moravia ====
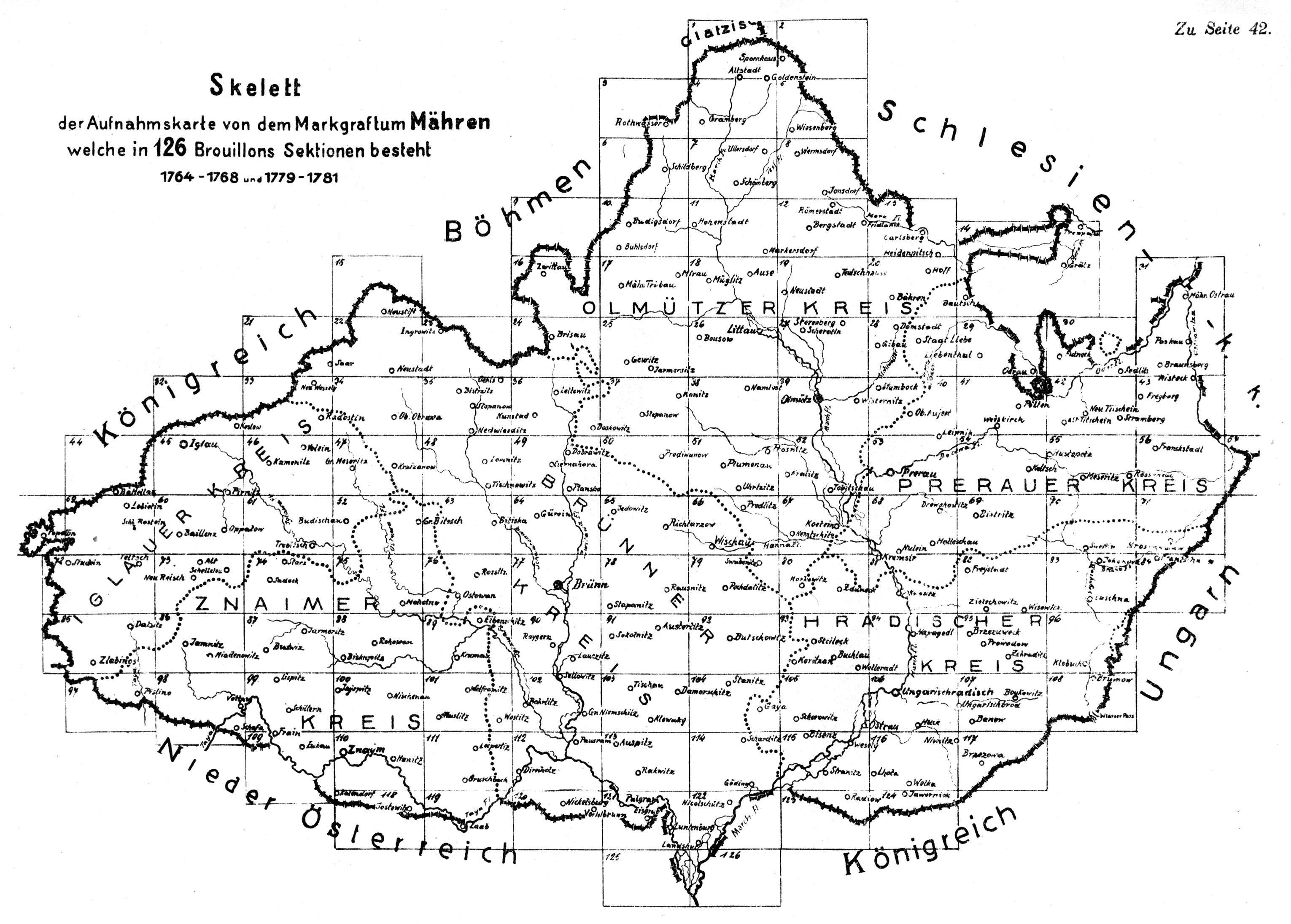
Overview map of Moravia from the Josephinian Land Survey (c. 1764–81) showing the Kreise

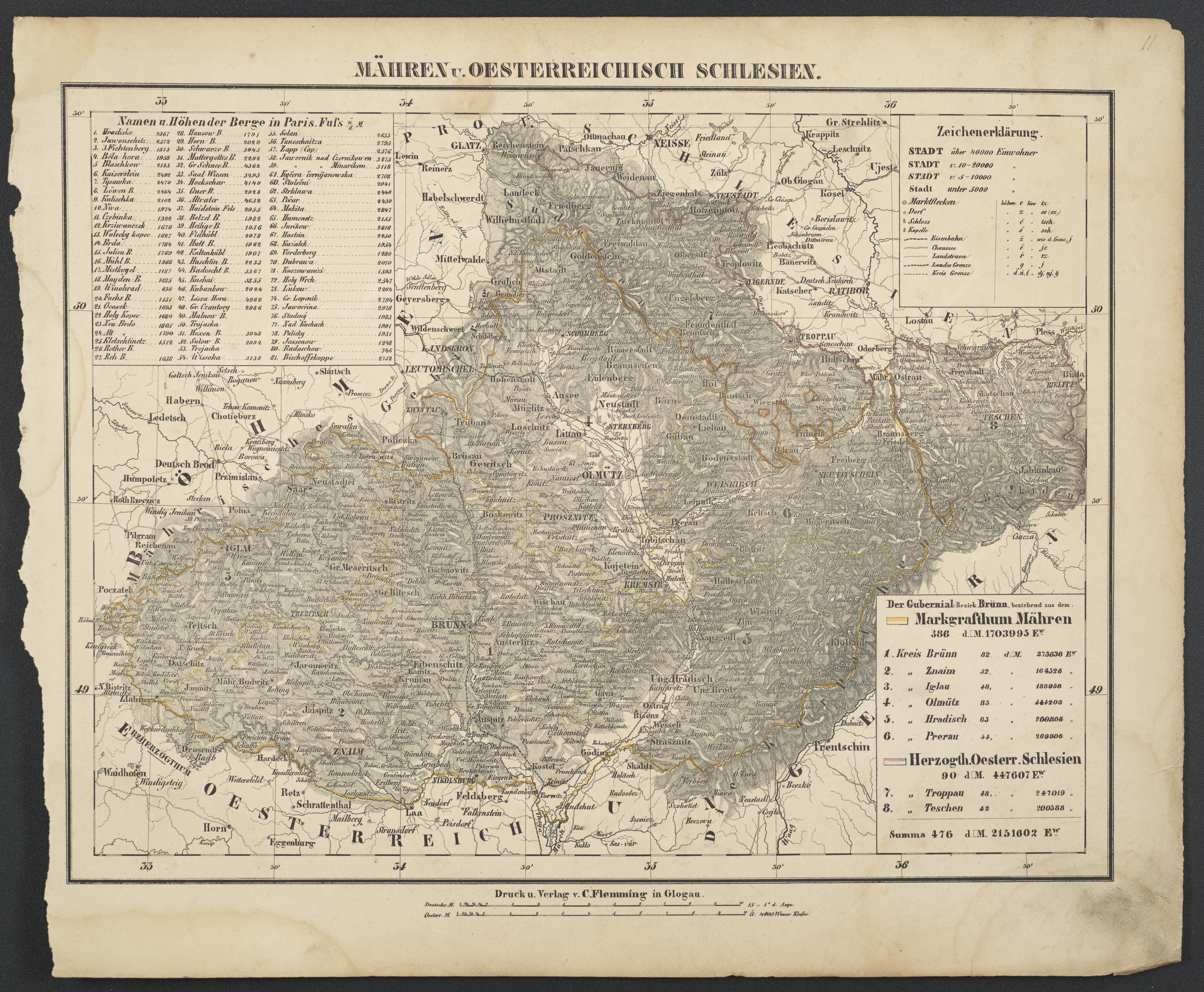
Kreise of Moravia and Austrian Silesia c. 1845

Until 1848 part of the joint Gubernium of Moravia and Silesia (Gouvernment Mähren und Schlesien or Mährischschlesisches Landesgubernium; Moravskoslezské gubernium).

- City of Brünn (Brno)
- Kreis Brünn or Brünner Kreis (Czech: Brněnský kraj); in the late 18th century included the area around Saar/Žďár, Neustadtl/Nové Město and Bystrzitz/Bystřice, which later became part of the Iglauer Kreis.
- Kreis Iglau or Iglauer Kreis (Czech: Jihlavský kraj; Jihlava)
- Kreis Neutitschein (Czech: Novojičínský kraj; Nový Jičín); until 1848: Kreis Prerau or Prerauer Kreis (Czech: Přerovský kraj; Přerov); Prerau/Přerov itself became part of Kreis Olmütz in 1854.
- Kreis Olmütz or Olmützer Kreis (Czech: Olomoucký kraj; Olomouc)
  - City of Olmütz (Stadtbezirk subordinate to Kreis Olmütz)
- Kreis Hradisch or Hradischer Kreis (Czech: Hradišťský kraj; Uherské Hradiště)
- Kreis Znaim or Znaimer Kreis (Czech: Znojemský kraj; Znojmo)

The traditional Moravian Kreise were abolished in 1849 (see below) but were reconstituted (with some border changes and with Nový Jičín/Neutitschein replacing Přerov/Prerau) in 1854 and divided into Bezirke (76 in total, excluding the cities of Brünn and Olmütz). Changes included:

- the assignment of the upper (southern) Bečva valley (Bezirk Wsetin/Vsetín) to Kreis Neutitschein (formerly part of the Hradischer Kreis)
- the assignment of Bezirk Prerau (Přerov) to Kreis Olmütz (formerly the nominal seat of the Prerauer Kreis).
- the assignment of Bezirk Göding (Hodonín) and Bezirk Kremsier (Kroměříž) to Kreis Hradisch (formerly of the Brünner Kreis and the Prerauer Kreis respectively; Kwassitz/Kvasice, which was part of the new Bezirk Kremsier had already been part of the Hradischer Kreis pre-1848)
- the assignment of the Bezirke Gewitsch, (Mährisch) Triebau and Zwittau (Jevíčko, Moravská Třebová and Svitavy), as well as part of the new Bezirk Boskowitz around Knichnitz (Knínice) to Kreis Brünn (formerly of the Olmützer Kreis).
- the assignment of Bezirk Nikolsburg (Mikulov) to Kreis Znaim (formerly of the Brünner Kreis).
- several settlements along the borders of Kreis Iglau, Kreis Brünn and Kreis Znaim, as well as several exclaves, changed hands, including Groß Bitesch (Velká Bíteš; from Znaim to Iglau) and Eibenschütz (Ivančice; from Znaim to Brünn).

The Moravian Kreise were dissolved in 1860 and their Bezirke (and Bezirksämter) subordinated directly to the Statthalterei in Brünn/Brno.

===== 1849–54 =====
In the 1849 administrative reforms which followed the Revolutions of 1848 and introduced the first political districts (Bezirkshaupmannschaften), the Kreise of Moravia were reduced to two:

- Brünner Kreis (Brněnský kraj) – 12 political districts:
  - Brünn
  - Trübau
  - Boskowitz
  - Wischau
  - Gaya
  - Auspitz
  - Iglau
  - Datschitz
  - Neustadtl
  - Znaym [sic]
  - Kromau
  - Nikolsburg
- Olmützer Kreis (Olomoucký kraj) – 13 political districts:
  - Olmütz
  - Sternberg
  - Schönberg
  - Hohenstadt
  - Littau
  - Neutitschein
  - Weißkirchen
  - Mistek (now part of Frýdek-Místek)
  - Wallachisch-Meseritsch
  - Hradisch
  - Kremsier
  - Holleschau
  - Ungarischbrod [sic]

The six pre-revolution Kreise were reconstituted, with various changes, in the reforms of 1853/54.

==== Austrian Silesia ====
Map of the Teschner Kreis c. 1844.

Formally the Duchy of Upper and Lower Silesia (Herzogtum Ober- und Niederschlesien). Until 1848 part of the joint Gubernium of Moravia and Silesia (Gouvernment Mähren und Schlesien or Mährischschlesisches Landesgubernium). Although administratively separate Silesia was judicially subordinate to Brünn (Moravia) thereafter. Austrian Silesia had no Kreise after the 1849 or 1853 reforms, but the separate Kreisgerichte remained for judicial matters.

- City of Troppau (Opava)
- Kreis Troppau or Troppauer Kreis (Czech: Opavský kraj)
- Kreis Teschen or Teschner Kreis (Czech: Těšínský kraj; Polish: Cyrkuł cieszyński; seat at Těšín, German: Teschen, Polish: Cieszyn; similar to Cieszyn Silesia but with an exclave on the far side of the Oder)

From 1860 Silesia was administered once again from the Moravian Statthalterei in Brünn/Brno but remained a formally separate crown land.

=== Archduchy of Austria ===
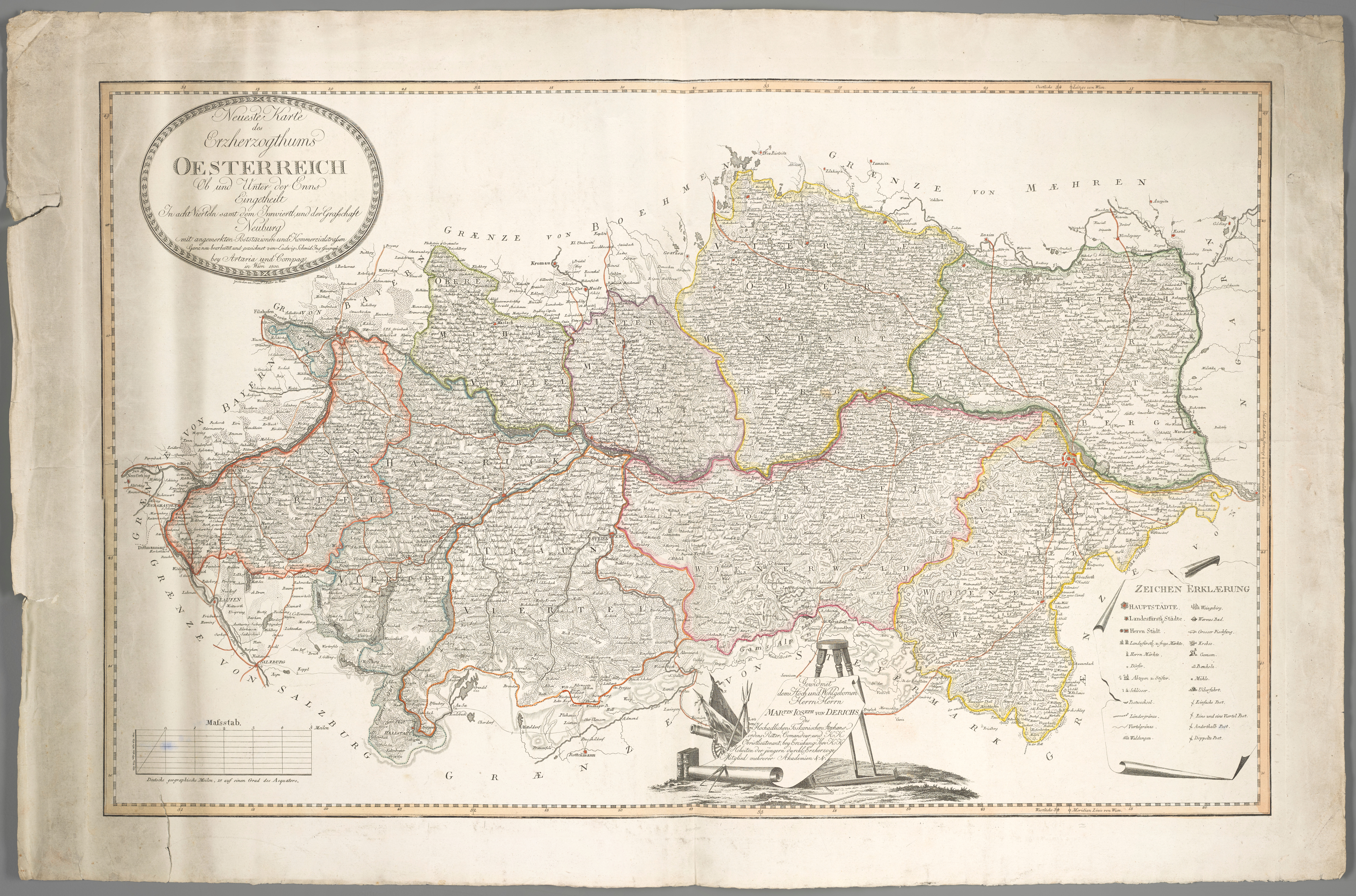
The Viertel (Kreise) of Austria (above and below the Enns) c. 1800. The Mühlkreis is shown divided into Upper and Lower sections. The map also shows the County of Neuburg in the north-west, which was not part of Austria.

==== Austria below the Enns ====
Corresponds with modern Lower Austria.

- from 1850: the city of Vienna (Wien) (traditionally part of the Kreis Unter dem Wienerwald)
- Kreis Ober (dem) Manhartsberg ('Circle above the Manhartsberg'); seat at Krems.
- Kreis Ober (dem) Wienerwald ('Circle above the Vienna Woods'), seat at Sankt Pölten.
- Kreis Unter (dem) Manhartsberg ('Circle below the Manhartsberg'); seat at Korneuburg.
- Kreis Unter (dem) Wienerwald ('Circle below the Vienna Woods'); seat at Wiener Neustadt from 1853; c. 1842 administered from Vienna, Baden and Wiener Neustadt; earlier Traiskirchen.
- from 1866: the city of Wiener Neustadt

==== Austria above the Enns ====
Corresponds with modern Upper Austria. The Kreise in Austria above the Enns were from 1749 subdivided into district commissions and regional courts.

- from 1850: the city of Linz (previously part of the Mühlkreis; part of the Hausruckkreis until the early 19th century)
- Hausruckkreis; 1810–16 partially annexed to Bavarian Unterdonaukreis. (Note: By the 1809 Treaty of Schönbrunn the Kingdom of Bavaria annexed various territories from Austria in 1810. These were returned in the 1816 Treaty of Munich.) Seat at Wels.
- after 1779: Innkreis; annexed from the Electorate of Bavaria by the 1779 Treaty of Teschen; 1810–16 to Bavarian Unterdonaukreis. Seat at Ried.
- Mühlkreis; seat at Linz (from the early 19th century). Comprised the areas north of the Danube and, from the early 19th century, the immediate area around Linz. Initially divided into Upper and Lower sections, corresponding to the pre-1779 Mühlviertel (upper, western) and Machlandviertel/Schwarzviertel (lower, eastern).
- from 1867: the city of Steyr (traditionally part of the Traunkreis)
- Traunkreis; seat at Steyer. Traditionally bounded by the Traun river. In the early 19th century expanded to include part of the western Traun basin, roughly up to the boundaries of the modern Gmunden District (excluding St. Wolfgang im Salzkammergut). Upon the re-establishment of the Kreise in 1853 roughly the western third of the previous Traunkreis, including Ischl, Gmunden and Hallstatt (roughly corresponding to the modern Gmunden District and some parts of the Wels-Land District south of the Traun), became part of the Hausruckkreis.
- 1816–1849: Salzburgkreis or Salzachkreis (see below); the Electorate of Salzburg was mediatised to Austria in the 1805 Peace of Pressburg; 1810–16 to Bavarian Salzachkreis; integrated into Austria above the Enns as a Kreis in 1816. Seat at Salzburg.

=== Duchy of Salzburg (from 1849) ===
Formerly the Salzburgkreis or Salzachkreis of Austria above the Enns, the Duchy of Salzburg became a crown land in its own right (with a single Kreis) on 26 June 1849 (formally constituted 30 December). The Duchy of Salzburg had no Kreise after 1853.

- City of Salzburg
- Salzburgkreis or Salzachkreis (1849 to 1853)

=== Duchy of Styria ===
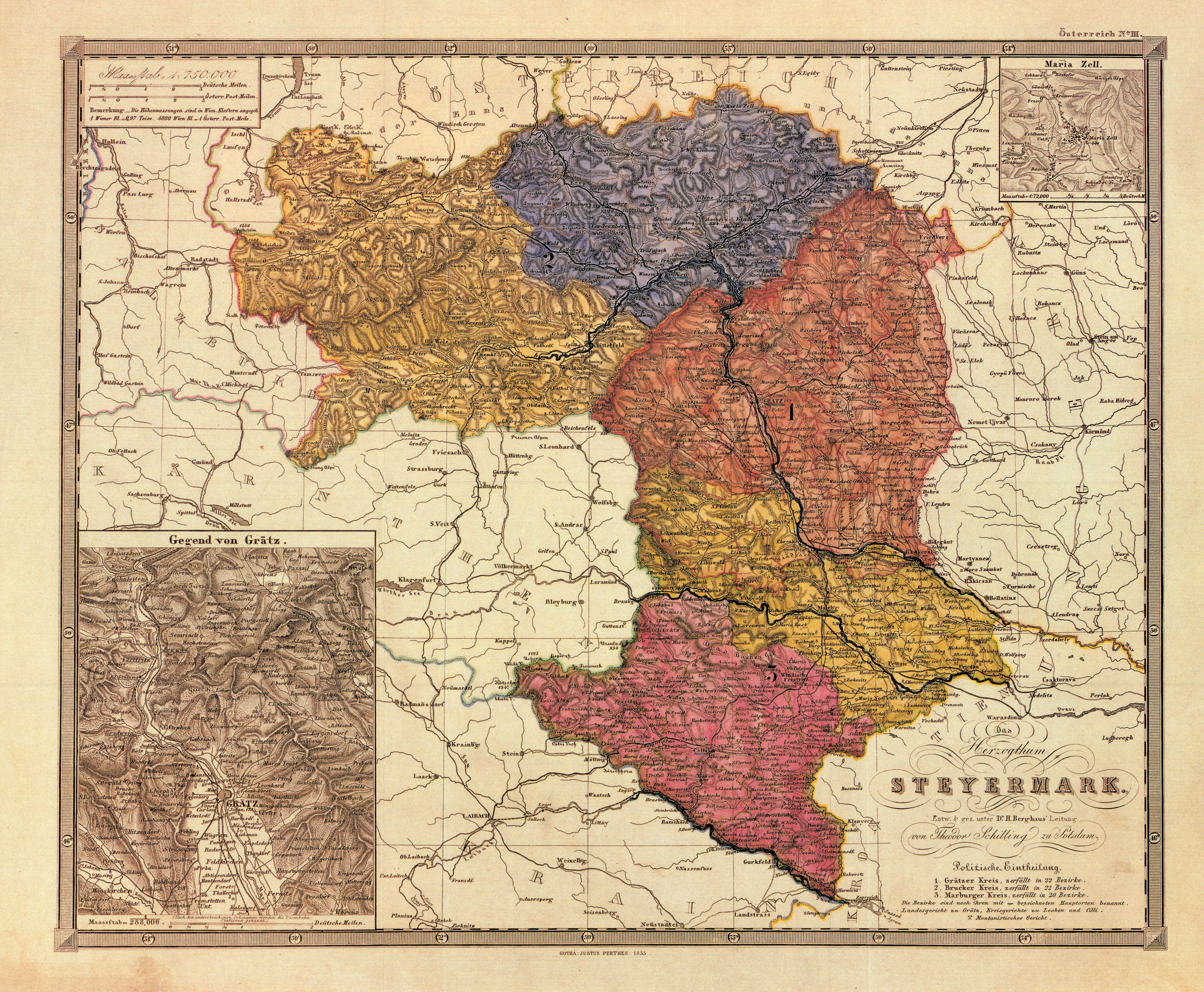
Kreise of Styria c. 1855. The solid coloured areas show the pre-1848 Kreise; the post-1848 Kreise are shown as numbered areas.

The Duchy of Styria (German: Herzogtum Steiermark, contemporary spelling Herzogthum Steyermark), although administered as a single gubernium/Gouvernement, was divided into upper and lower parts – Obersteiermark (Obere-Steyermark) and Untersteiermark (Untere-Steyermark). The upper part, which comprised the Judenburger and Brucker Kreise, corresponds with the modern Austrian use of the term Upper Styria, i.e. the modern districts of Bruck-Mürzzuschlag, Leoben, Liezen, Murau and Murtal in the north-west of the modern Austrian state of Styria; from 1848 it was synonymous with the now-expanded Brucker Kreis. The lower part, which comprised the Grazer, Marburger and Cillier Kreise, included all of Slovene Styria and the modern Austrian Central Styria.

- City of Graz (from 1850)
- Kreis Graz or Grazer Kreis (also spelled Gratz(er), Grätz(er))
- Kreis Bruck or Brucker Kreis (Bruck an der Mur); Kreisgericht ('circle/district court') in 1854 in Leoben.
- Kreis Marburg or Marburger Kreis (Marburg an der Drau, Slovene: Maribor); in 1848 northwestern parts merged into Kreis Graz; Kreisgericht ('circle/district court') in 1854 in Cilli.
- until 1848: Kreis Cilli or Cillier Kreis (Celje; merged into Kreis Marburg 1848; also spelled Zilli(er))
- until 1848: Kreis Judenburg or Judenburger Kreis (Judenburg; merged into Kreis Bruck 1848)

=== Kingdom of Illyria (until 1849) ===
Map of the Kreise of "Inner Austria", i.e. Illyria (red outline) and Styria (orange outline), c. 1841.

The Kingdom of Illyria was a crown land formed as a successor to the Napoleonic Illyrian Provinces (Note: The Illyrian provinces contained some territory – eastern Tyrol around Lienz – which was not part of the Kingdom of Illyria. Likewise, eastern/"Lower" Carinthia was part of the Kingdom of Illyria but never part of the Illyrian Provinces, having remained Austrian in 1809.) after the 1815 Congress of Vienna returned its territory to Austria. It was divided into two Gubernia: Gubernium Laibach (Note: Gubernium Laibach was also known as Upper Illyria (Ober-Illyrien)) and Gubernium Triest. (Note: Gubernium Triest was also known as Lower Illyria (Unter-Illyrien) or as the Littoral (Küstenland), a name also used for the post-1849 crown land.) It was disbanded in 1849 and replaced with the separate Duchy of Carinthia, Duchy of Carniola and Austrian Littoral crown lands. The Kreise listed below are grouped by these post-1849 crown lands; internally within the Kingdom they were grouped as such, and the duchies and subdivisions of the Littoral correspond with Habsburg states which existed before the 1809 Treaty of Schönbrunn by which they were annexed by Napoleon.

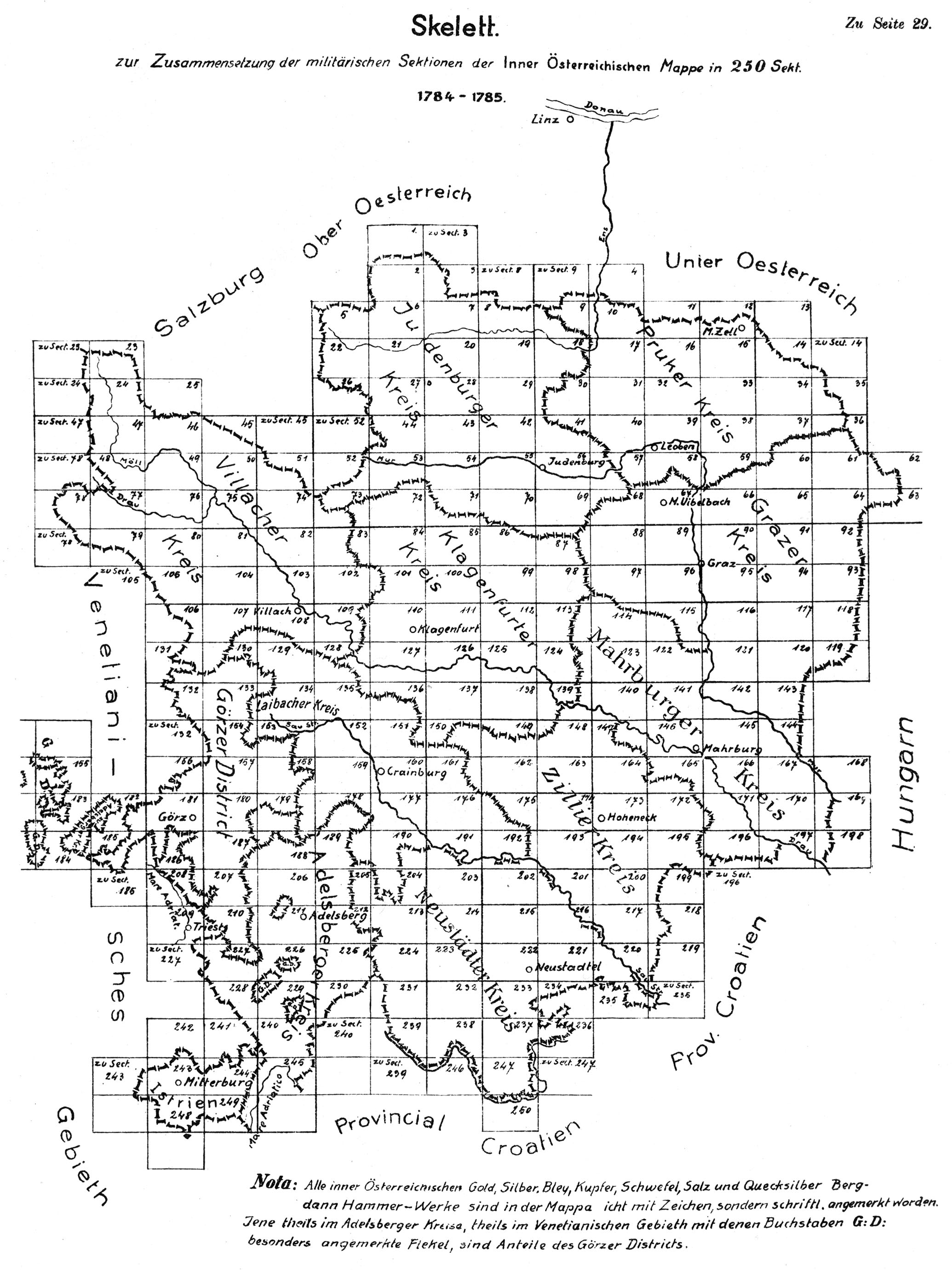
Overview map of Inner Austria from the Josephinian Land Survey (c. 1784–85) showing the Kreise.

Until 1809 the area (excluding those parts of Croatia and the Military Frontier which were Illyrian until the 1820s) was organised as part of Inner Austria, an informal region which comprised the Duchies of Styria, Carinthia and Carniola, the County of Gorizia and Gradisca, the March/Margraviate of Istria and the Free City of Trieste. During this period the Habsburg March of Istria only included a small interior part of the peninsula centred on Mitterburg (Pazin, Pisino) and was administered from Carniola; the north-eastern mostly inland part of the later Istrian Kreis, as well as part of the eastern coast of the peninsula and a northern coastal exclave around Duino-Aurisina were part of the Carniolan Adelsberger Kreis. The Republic of Venice held most of the peninsula itself, including all of the western coast and around half of the eastern coast, as well as the islands in the Kvarner Gulf including Krk and Cres; the Venetian territories were annexed by Austria (as the Venetian Province) in the 1797 Treaty of Campo Formio, but lost again to the Napoleonic Kingdom of Italy in the 1805 Peace of Pressburg. The mercury-mining area around Idrija had a special status apart from the Carniolan Kreise. The Princely County of Gorizia and Gradisca included several exclaves in Venetian territory and within the Carniolan Adelsberger Kreis; by the 1805 Peace of Pressburg and 1807 Treaty of Fontainebleau, the parts of the county west of the Soča/Isonzo were ceded to the Napoleonic Kingdom of Italy.

==== Duchy of Carinthia ====
The Duchy of Carinthia (Herzogt(h)um Kärnten) was 1815–49 part of Gubernium Laibach of the Kingdom of Illyria; separate crown land thereafter. Carinthia had no Kreise after 1853.

- from 1850: City of Klagenfurt
- Klagenfurter Kreis or Kreis Klagenfurt (comprised Lower Carinthia until 1848)
- until 1848: Villacher Kreis or Kreis Villach (Villach; Upper Carinthia)

==== Duchy of Carniola ====
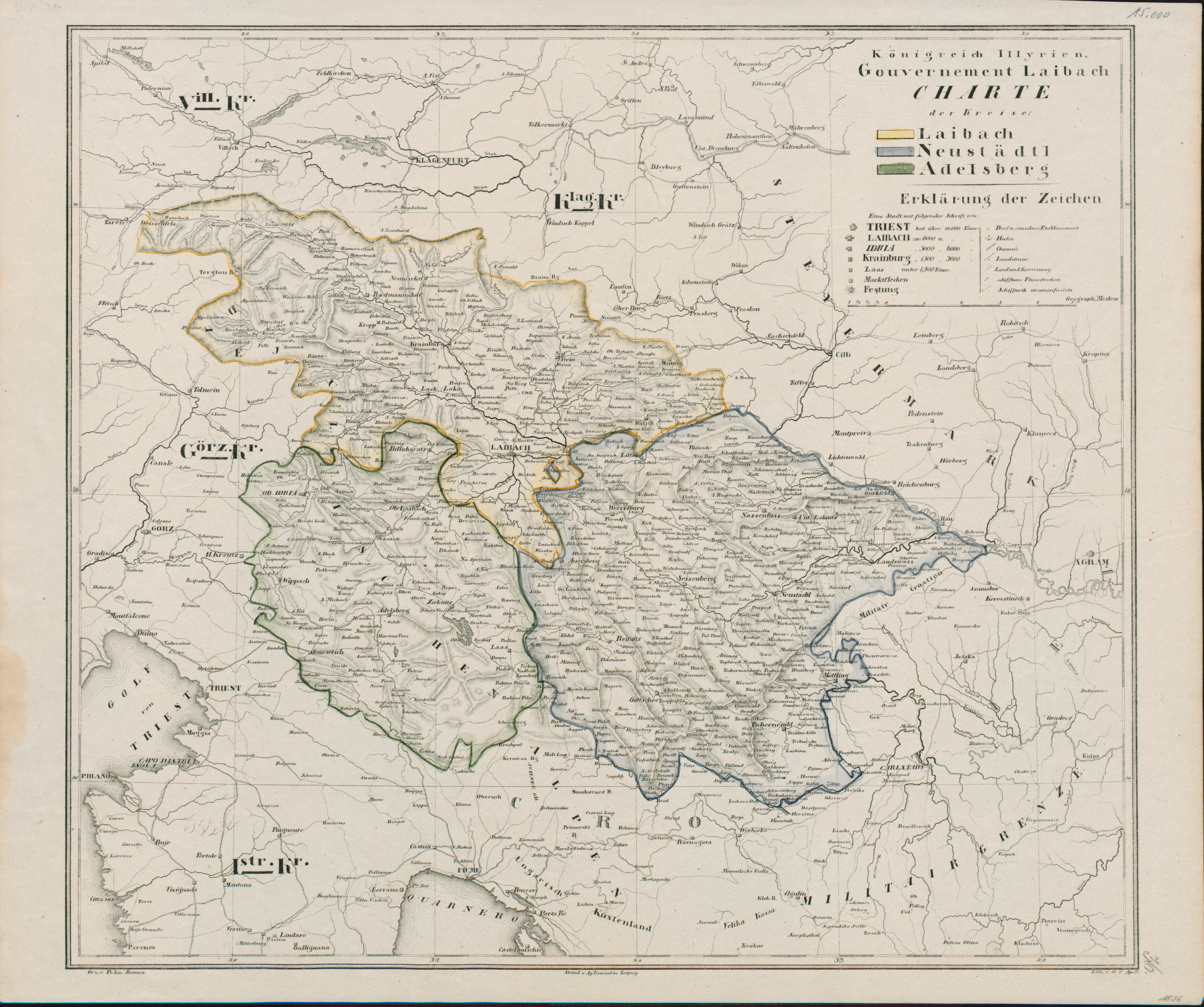
Map of the Kreise of Carniola c. 1836

The Duchy of Carniola (Herzogt(h)um Krain) was 1815–49 part of Gubernium Laibach of the Kingdom of Illyria. Carniola had no Kreise after 1853.

- from 1850: City of Laibach (Ljubljana)
- Kreis Laibach or Laibacher Kreis (comprising Upper Carniola until 1848; all of Carniola thereafter. Sometimes spelled Laybach.)
- until 1848: Kreis Adelsberg or Adelsberger Kreis (Postojna; Inner Carniola).
- until 1848: Kreis Neustädtl or Neustädt(l)er Kreis (Novo mesto; Lower Carniola)

==== Littoral ====
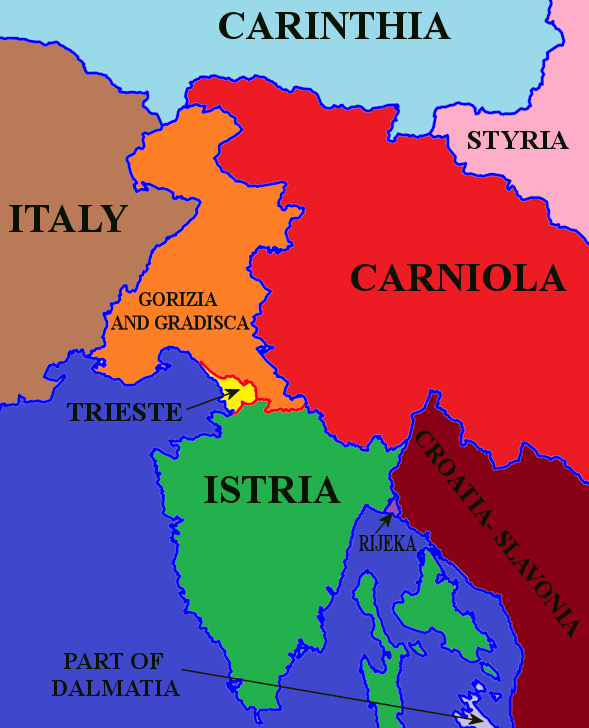
Map of the Austrian Littoral, showing the situation some time after 1868; however the Littoral's internal borders are unchanged from the 1850s.

Formally the Princely County of Gorizia and Gradisca, the Margraviate of Istria and the City of Triest with its Territory (die gefürstete Grafschaft Görz und Gradiska, die Markgrafschaft Istrien und die Stadt Triest mit ihr Gebiet). 1815–49 Gubernium Triest of the Kingdom of Illyria; separate crown land thereafter.

- City of Triest (Italian: Trieste, Slovene: Trst)
- City of Görz (Gorizia, Gorica)
- Kreis Görz; also Görzer Kreis, österreichisches Friaul (Austrian Friuli)
- Kreis Istrien (Istria, Istra); also Istrier Kreis, Mitterburger Kreis. Seat in Mitterburg (Pazin, Pisino); Kreisgericht in Rovigno.
- City of Rovigno (Croatian: Rovinj)

Judicially the Gorizian districts of Comen (Komen) and Sessana (Sežana) and the Istrian districts of Capo d'Istria (Koper, Kopar), Pirano (Piran), Castel-Nuovo (Podgrad) and Volosca (Volosko) were subordinate to the Landesgericht in Trieste (c. 1853).

==== Other ====
Map of Illyria and Styria c. 1818

In addition to the Kreise of Carinthia, Carniola and the Littoral listed above, until the 1820s the Kingdom of Illyria also included the former Croatie civile province of the Napoleonic Illyrian Provinces. This territory was transferred to the re-established Kingdom of Croatia, except for Fiume (Rijeka), which returned to its previous status as a Corpus separatum under Hungary. This was organised into:

- Kreis Karlstadt/Karlstädter Kreis (Karlovac)
- Kreis Fiume/Fiumaner Kreis (Fiume/Rijeka, which also included the eastern parts of the Istrian peninsula which would later become part of Kreis Istrien

Like the Littoral, these belonged to Gubernium Triest. During this time the remainder of Istria and the southern part of what was later Görz, including all of its coastline (much of which had been part of the Carniolan Adelsberger Kreis until 1809), was organised as the Triester Kreis, which was distinct from the city of Triest.

=== Tyrol and Vorarlberg ===
Maps showing the Kreise of the County of Tyrol with Vorarlberg

c. 1838

c. 1856

Formally the Princely County of Tyrol with Vorarlberg (die gefürstete Grafschaft Tirol mit Vorarlberg) until 1861.

The Kreise of Tyrol and Vorarlberg were constituted following the return of these territories to Austria by the 1815 Congress of Vienna. While the County of Tyrol had been a Habsburg possession for centuries the southern parts of what became Tyrol had constituted the Prince-Bishopric of Trent and Prince-Bishopric of Brixen until they were mediatised to Austria in 1803 (in the Reichsdeputationshauptschluss); some areas in the east – Zillertal, Brixental and Matrei – belonged to the Prince-Archbishopric of Salzburg (Electorate of Salzburg from 1803). Vorarlberg formed part of the so-called Further Austria.

Both Tyrol (including the mediatised areas) and Vorarlberg were ceded to the Kingdom of Bavaria in the 1805 Peace of Pressburg; in the 1808 Bavarian constitution Tyrol was reorganised into the Etschkreis, Eisackkreis and Innkreis while Vorarlberg became part of the Illerkreis.

In 1810 Bavaria ceded the Etschkreis plus Bozen to the Napoleonic Kingdom of Italy (most of which became the Department of Alto Adige) and some eastern areas to the French Empire's Illyrian Provinces. The rump Eisackkreis, as well as the Zillertal and Werdenfels, were integrated into the Innkreis and parts of the Innkreis were transferred to other Bavarian Kreise.

Upon the return of these areas to Austria six new Kreise were established in the re-constituted Tyrol. Each of these broadly corresponded to half of one of the 1808 Bavarian Kreise:

- the Bavarian Etschkreis (which covered the southern part of the Etsch valley around Trient/Trento – roughly modern Trentino) became Kreis Rovereto/Roveredo and Kreis Trient
- the Eisackkreis (plus Matrei – most of modern South Tyrol plus East Tyrol) became the Austrian Etschkreis (or Bozener Kreis, which covered the upper Etsch valley around Bozen/Bolzano) and Brunecker Kreis (or Kreis Pustertal)
- the Innkreis (plus the Zillertal and Brixental) became Kreis Oberinntal (or Imster Kreis) and Unterinntal (or Unter-Inn- und Wipptal; Schwazer Kreis).

Vorarlberg was also attached to Tyrol as a seventh Kreis.

These Kreise were reconstituted in 1849, becoming:

- City of Innsbruck
- Kreis Innsbruck. Broadly coextensive with modern North Tyrol. Formed in 1849 from:
  - Kreis Oberinntal (Note: In contemporary German the word Tal, meaning valley, was spelled Thal, as were the names of Kreise which included it, i.e.: Oberinnthal or Ober-Innthal; Unterinnthal, Unter-Innthal or Unter-Inn und Wippthal; Pusterthal.) (Upper Inntal/Inn Valley) or Imster Kreis
  - Kreis Unterinntal (Lower Inntal); also Kreis Unter-Inn- und Wipptal or Schwazer Kreis
- City of Bozen
- Kreis Brixen, centred on Bozen. Broadly coextensive with modern South and East Tyrol. (Note: In addition to the territory of modern South and East Tyrol, Kreis Brixen also included Livinallongo del Col di Lana, Colle Santa Lucia and Cortina d'Ampezzo, which are now part of Belluno. It also excluded Graun im Vinschgau (which was part of Kreis Innsbruck), and a few municipalities which were part of Kreis Trient. (Note: In addition to the territory of modern Trentino, post-1849 Kreis Trient also included what is now: Valvestino and Magasa in Brescia; Pedemonte in Vicenza; Unsere Liebe Frau im Walde-St. Felix, Laurein/Lauregno and Proveis/Proves in South Tyrol.; The northernmost part of the Chiese valley was part of the Austrian Kingdom of Lombardy–Venetia (specifically the Lombard province of Bergamo) at this time. Kreis Trient gained Truden/Trodena (previously part of the Bozener Kreis, today part of South Tyrol) in the 1854 reforms.)) Formed in 1849 from:
  - Kreis Pustertal or Brunecker Kreis
  - Etschkreis or Bozener Kreis
  - The district of Glurns, formerly belonging to Kreis Oberinntal
- until 1861: Kreis Bregenz, Bregenzer Kreis, Kreis Vorarlberg or Vorarlberger Kreis; detached as a separate crown land – Land Vorarlberg – in the 1861 February Patent.
- City of Rovereto
- City of Trient (Italian: Trento)
- Kreis Trient. After 1849 it was broadly coextensive with modern Trentino.
- until 1849: Kreis Rovereto (or Roveredo); merged into Kreis Trient 1849. A Kreisgericht of Roveredo covering the former territory of Kreis Roveredo (the Bezirke of Ala, Arco, Condino, Mori, Nogaredo, Riva, Roveredo, Stenico and Tione) existed within Kreis Trient as of 1854.

=== Galicia and Lodomeria; Bukovina ===
Formally the Kingdom of Galicia and Lodomeria with the Grand Duchy of Kraków (after 1846) and the Duchies of Auschwitz and Zator (Königreich Galizien und Lodomerien mit dem Großherzogt(h)um Krakau und den Herzogt(h)ümern Auschwitz und Zator). The Grand Duchy of Kraków, which was annexed in 1846 (previously the Free City of Cracow) corresponded with the Krakauer Kreis; Auschwitz and Zator had no administrative status, with both forming part of the Wadowicer Kreis, although nominally they were part of the German Confederation while the rest was not.

The Kreise in Galicia and Lodomeria were abolished in 1865 (enacted 23 September, effective 31 October).

- City of Lemberg (Ukrainian: Львів, romanized: Lviv, Polish: Lwów)
- Kreis Lemberg or Lemberger Kreis
- Kreis Bochnia or Bochnier Kreis; merged with Kreis Krakau 1860
- Kreis Brzeżan or Brzeżaner Kreis (Berezhany)
- Kreis Bukowina, Bukowiner Kreis, Czernowitzer Kreis or Kreis Czernowitz; military district before 1786; separate crown land – the Duchy of Bukovina – from 1849; the Duchy had no Kreise from 1853; reincorporated (as Kreis Czernowitz) into Galicia and Lodomeria in 1860; re-separated in the 1861 February Patent.
- City of Czernowitz (Ukrainian: Чернівці́, romanized: Chernivtsi Romanian: Cernăuți); part of Bukovina when a separate crown land.
- Kreis Czortków or Czortówer Kreis (Chortkiv) – former Russian part of Kreis Zaleszczyki restored to Austria by the Congress of Vienna 1815.
- Kreis Jasło or Jasłoer Kreis; disbanded and split between the Sandecer (Bezirke Gorlice and Biecz), Tarnower (Bezirke Brzostek, Frysztak and Jasło), Rzeszower (Bezirk Strzyżów) and Sanoker (Bezirke Krosno, Żmigród and Dukla) Kreise in 1860
- Kreis Kolomea or Kolomeaer Kreis (Kolomyja) – created in 1809 out of the rump of Kreis Zaleszczyki and part of Kreis Stanislau.
- City of Krakau (Polish: Kraków)
- after 1846: Kreis Krakau (see Grand Duchy of Kraków)
- Kreis Przemyśl or Przemyśler Kreis (Przemyśl; Ukrainian: Перемишль, romanized: Peremyshl, German: Premissel)
- Kreis Rzeszów or Rzeszówer Kreis (Rzeszów)
- Kreis Sambor or Samborer Kreis (Sambir)
- Kreis Sandec or Sandecer Kreis (Neu Sandec; Polish: Nowy Sącz)
- Kreis Sanok or Sanoker Kreis (Sanok)
- Kreis Stanislau or Kreis Stanisławów, Stanislauer Kreis, Stanisławower Kreis (Stanisławów, contemporary Ukrainian: Станісла́вів Stanislaviv; modern Івано-Франківськ Ivano-Frankivsk)
- Kreis Stryj or Kreis Stryi, Stryer Kreis (Stryi)
- Kreis Tarnopol or Tarnopoler Kreis (Tarnopol, Ukrainian: Тернопіль, romanized: Ternopil). Ceded to Russia in the 1809 Treaty of Schönbrunn – Tarnopolsky Krai. Restored to Austria by the Congress of Vienna 1815.
- Kreis Tarnów or Tarnówer Kreis (Tarnów)
- Kreis Wadowice or Wadowicer Kreis (Wadowice); Myslenicer Kreis until 1819; merged with Kreis Krakau 1860
- until 1809: Kreis Zamość; ceded to Duchy of Warsaw in the 1809 Treaty of Schönbrunn (to Congress Poland after 1815)
- Kreis Złoczów or Złozówer Kreis (Złoczów; German: Solotschiw, Ukrainian: Золочів, romanized: Zolochiv)
- Kreis Żółkiew or Zołkiewer Kreis (Żółkiew; German: Schowkwa, Ukrainian: Жовква, romanized: Zhovkva)
- until 1809: Kreis Zaleszczyki or Zalestschyker Kreis. Bulk of the Kreis (the part bounded by the Dniester and Strypa rivers) ceded to Russia in the 1809 Treaty of Schönbrunn – Tarnopolsky Krai; remainder becomes part of Kreis Kolomea. Restored to Austria by the Congress of Vienna 1815 as Kreis Czortków.

==== Regierungsbezirke (1850–53) ====
In 1850 Galicia and Lodomeria was divided into three Regierungsbezirke ('government districts'), named after their capitals: Lemberg, Krakau and Stanislau. The Kreise were abolished and replaced with political districts (Bezirkshauptmannschaften).

==== Verwaltungsbebiete (1854–60) ====
The 1850 changes to the administrative structure of the empire were reversed in Bach's January 1853 reforms, although the precise divisions remained to be determined. In April 1854 Galicia and Lodomeria was divided into two Verwaltungsgebiete (lit. 'administrative regions/territories') and its Kreise formally restored:

- Verwaltungsgebiet Lemberg, containing the 12 eastern Kreise:
  - Lemberg
  - Zołkiew
  - Przemyśl
  - Sanok
  - Złoczow
  - Brzezan
  - Stryi
  - Sambor
  - Tarnopol
  - Czortkow
  - Kolomea
  - Stanislau
- Verwaltungsgebiet Krakau, containing the 7 western Kreise:
  - Krakau
  - Wadowice
  - Sandec
  - Jasło
  - Rzeszow
  - Tarnow
  - Bochnia

The cities of Lemberg and Krakau remained directly subordinate to the crown land. Bukovina was not part of Galicia and Lodomeria at this time.

A list detailing the Bezirke of each Kreis from 1853 can be found at Subdivisions of the Kingdom of Galicia and Lodomeria § List of Kreise and Bezirke from 1854

In 1860 Verwaltungsgebiet Krakau and Bukovina were dissolved and re-subordinated to Lemberg.

==== West or New Galicia (1795–1803/09) ====
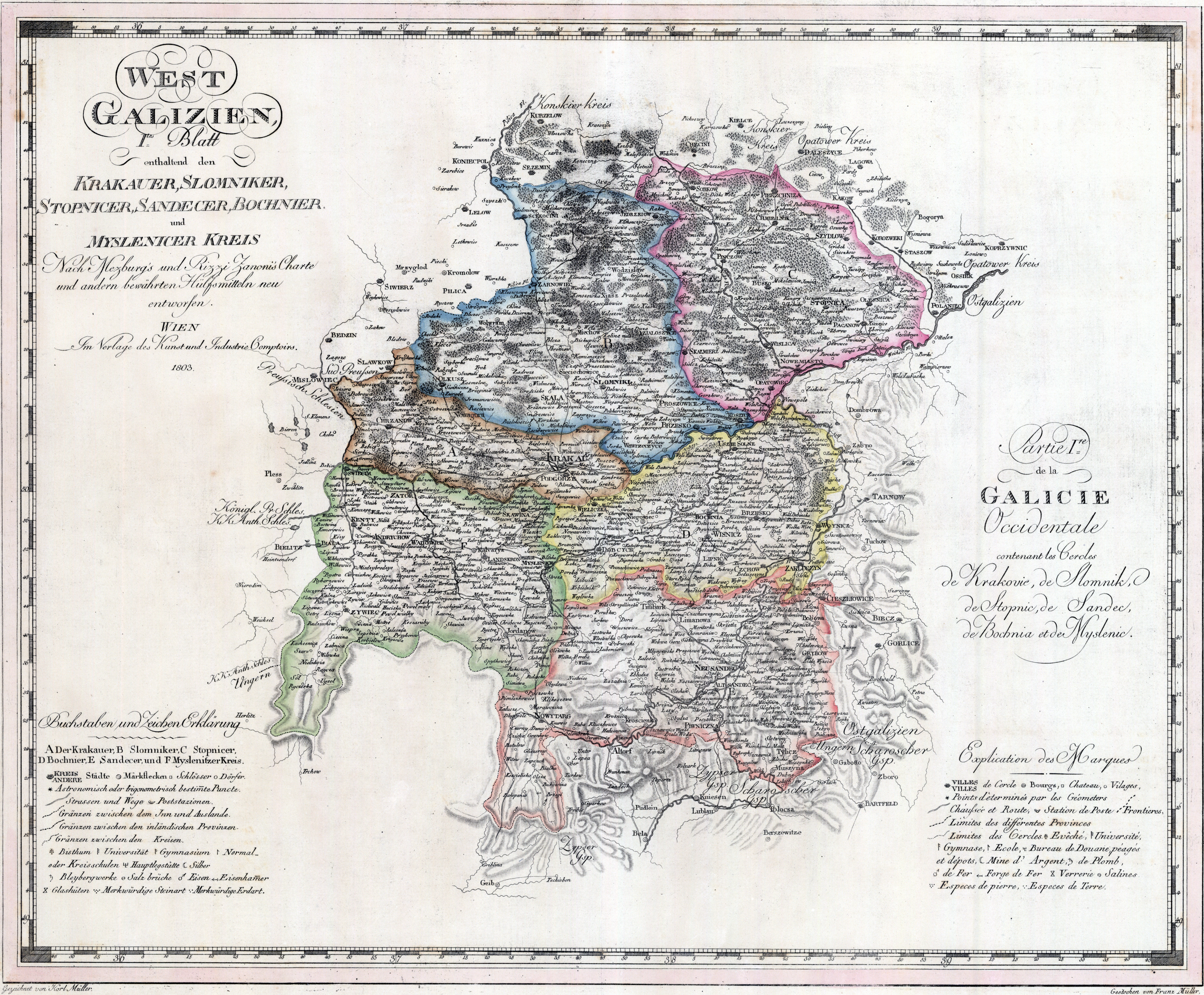
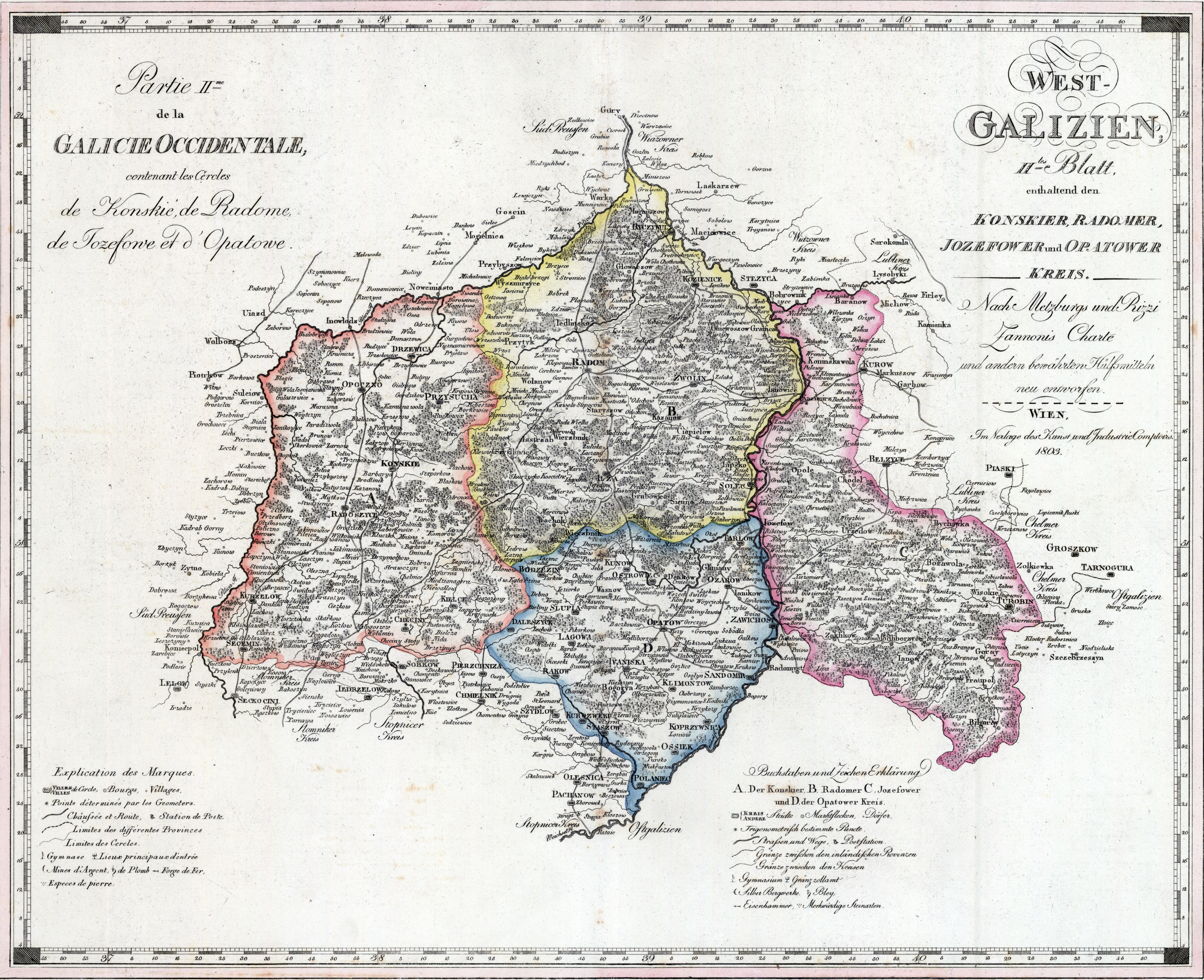
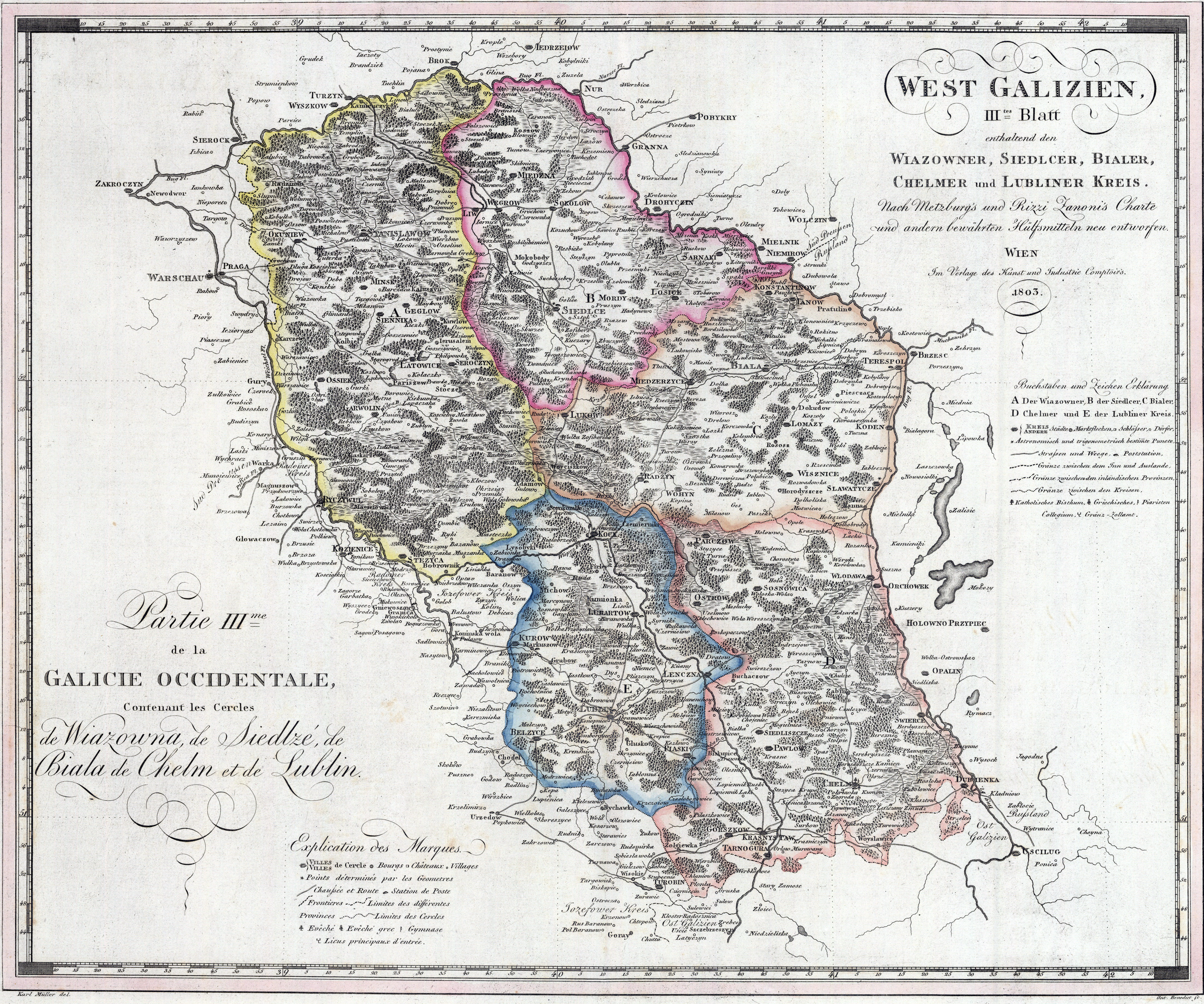
Maps of the Kreise of West Galicia c. 1803

West or New Galicia (Westgalizien/Neugalizien) comprised the Habsburgs' gains in the Third Partition of Poland in 1795. The first-partition Myslenicer, Sandecer and Bochnier Kreise were also attached to it. It was incorporated into Galicia and Lodomeria 1803–09 as a separate gubernium. Other than the first-partition Kreise it was ceded to the Duchy of Warsaw in 1809 by the Treaty of Schönbrunn (Congress Poland and Free City of Cracow after 1815).

- Krakauer Kreis (Kraków)
- Myslenicer Kreis (first partition)
- Sandecer Kreis (first partition)
- Bochnier Kreis (first partition)
- Slomniker Kreis (Słomniki)
- Stopnicer Kreis (Stopnica)
- Opatower Kreis (Opatów; before 1789: Kreis Sandomierz)
- Konskier Kreis (Końskie)
- Radomer Kreis (Radom)
- Jozefower Kreis (Józefów)
- Lubliner Kreis (Lublin)
- Chełmer Kreis or Chelmer Kreis (Chełm)
- Bialer Kreis (Biała Podlaska)
- Siedlcer Kreis (Siedlce)
- Wiazowner Kreis or Wiazownaer Kreis (Wiązowna; earlier: Kreis Mińsk)

=== Kingdom of Dalmatia ===
- Kreis Zara (Croatian: Zadar)
- Kreis Cattaro (Kotor)
- Kreis Ragusa (Dubrovnik)
- Kreis Spalato (Split)

The Kreise in Dalmatia were abolished in 1865 (enacted 5 December, effective 31 December).

=== Other crown lands ===
In the years following the revolutions of 1848 the Kreis system was extended to some additional crown lands:

==== Voivodeship of Serbia and Banat of Temeschwar ====
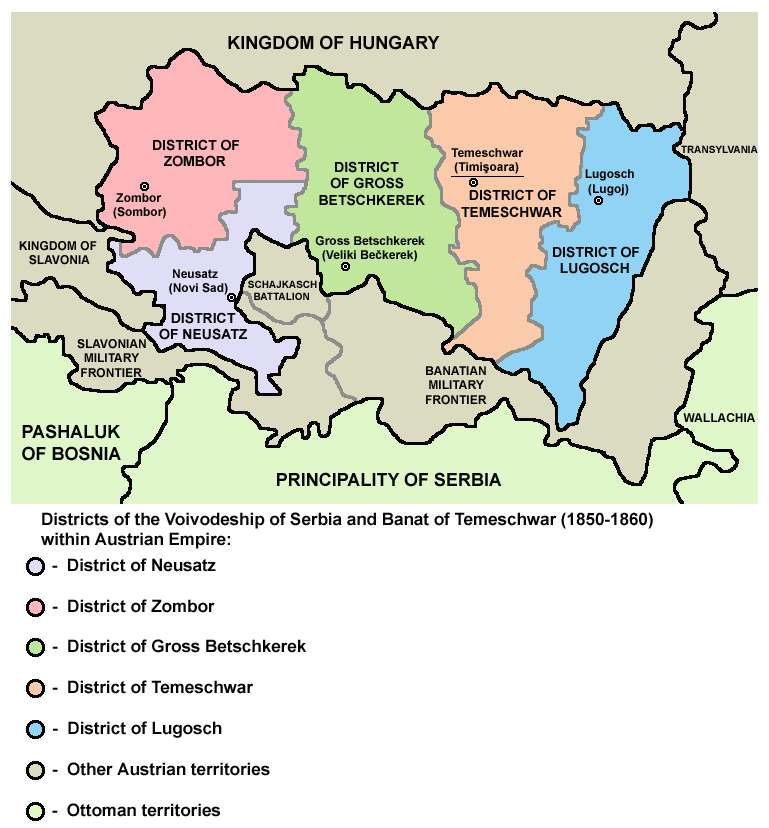
The Kreise of the Voivodeship of Serbia and Banat of Temeschwar.

The Voivodeship of Serbia and Banat of Temeschwar, a short-lived crown land which existed 1849–60, was formally divided into Kreise in 1854. Before the revolutions of 1848 it had been the Bács-Bodrog, Torontál, Temes, and Krassó Counties of Hungary and part of the Syrmia County of Slavonia

- Kreis Temesvár (Temesvár, German: Temeswar (or Temeschwar), Romanian: Timișoara, Serbian: Темишвар Temišvar). Corresponded with Temes County.
- Kreis Lugos ((Deutsch-)Lugos, modern German: Lugosch; Romanian: Lugoj, Serbian: Лугош Lugoš). Corresponded with Krassó County.
- Kreis Gross-Becskerek (modern German: Großbetschkerek; Hungarian: Nagybecskerek, Romanian: Becicherecul, Serbian: Велики Бечкерек Veliki Bečkerek; modern Serbian: Зрењанин Zrenjanin). Corresponded with Torontál County.
- Kreis Zombor (Zombor, Serbian: Сомбор Sombor). Corresponded with the northern parts of Bács-Bodrog County.
- Kreis Neusatz (Neusatz, Hungarian: Újvidék, Serbian: Нови Сад Novi Sad). Corresponded with the southern parts of Bács-Bodrog County and eastern parts of Syrmia County.

==== Grand Principality of Transylvania ====
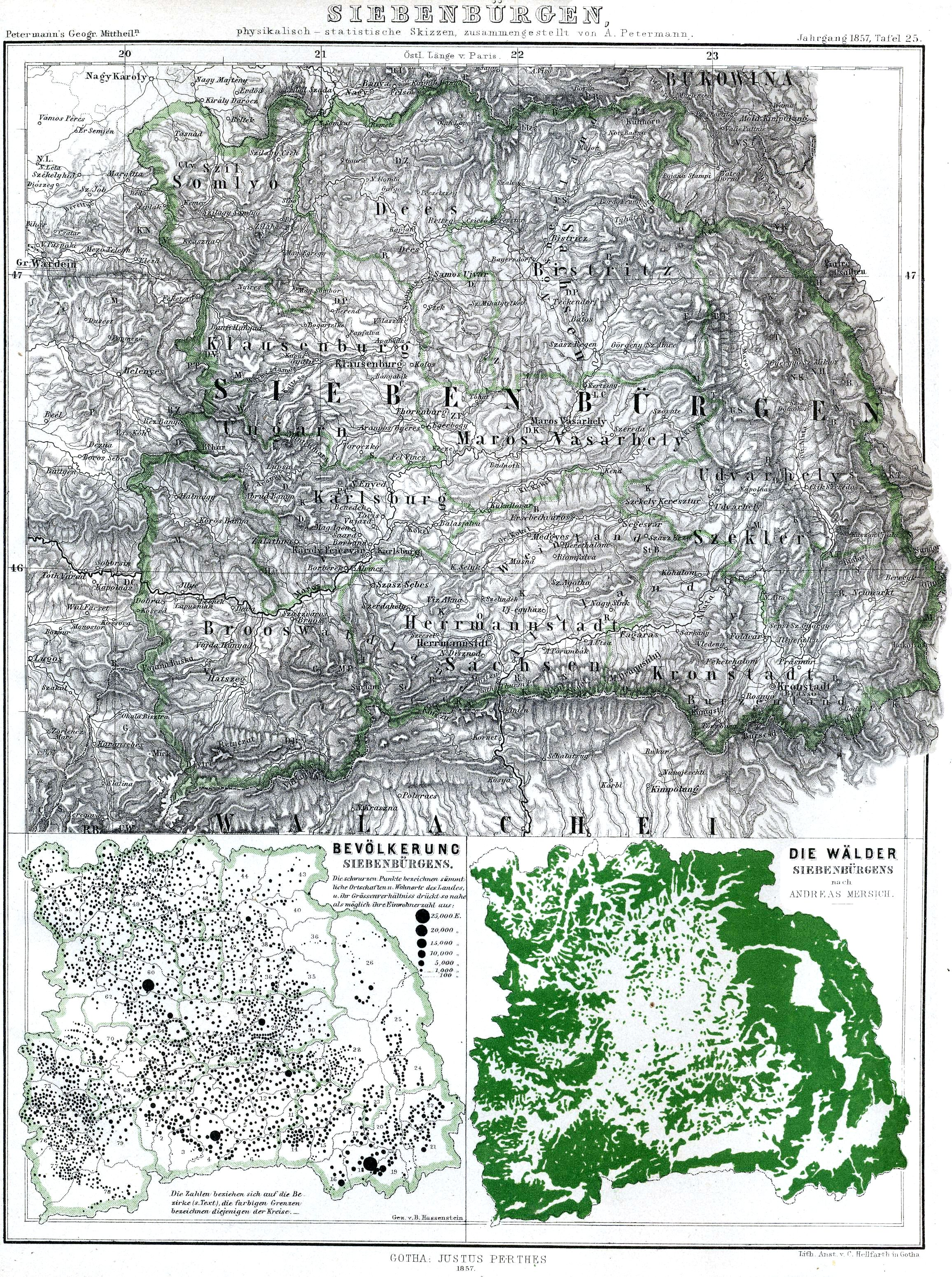
1857 map showing the Transylvanian Kreise after 1854.

- 1851–54 (5 Kreise or Verwaltungsgebiete):
  - Kreis Herrmannstadt or Herrmannstädter Kreis (the "Sachsenland"; Romanian: Sibiu, Hungarian: Nagyszeben)
  - Kreis Karlsburg or Karlsburger Kreis (Romanian: Alba Iulia, Hungarian: Gyulafehérvár)
  - Kreis Klausenburg or Klausenburger Kreis (Romanian: Cluj-Napoca, Hungarian: Kolozsvár)
  - Kreis Dées or Déeser Kreis (Romanian: Dej; modern Hungarian: Dés; German: Desch, Burglos)
  - Kreis Maros-Vásárhely (modern Hungarian: Marosvásárhely, Romanian: Târgu Mureș, German: Neumarkt am Mieresch)
- 1854 (10 Kreise):
  - Kreis Herrmannstadt
  - Kreis Kronstadt (Romanian: Brașov, Hungarian: Brassó)
  - Kreis Udvarhely (German: Odorhellen, Romanian: Odorheiu Secuiesc, Hungarian: (Székely)udvarhely)
  - Kreis Maros-Vásárhely
  - Kreis Bistritz (Romanian: Bistrița, Hungarian: Beszterce)
  - Kreis Déés
  - Kreis Szilágy-Somlyó (German: Schomlenmarkt, Romanian: Șimleu Silvaniei, modern Hungarian: Szilágysomlyó)
  - Kreis Klausenburg
  - Kreis Karlsburg
  - Kreis Broos (Romanian: Orăștie, Hungarian: Szászváros)

The traditional subdivisions of Transylvania (and the Partium) were restored in the 1860s.
