= Albert II =

Albert II may refer to:

== Monkeys ==
- Albert II (monkey), first primate and first mammal in space, died on impact following V-2 flight June 14, 1949

== People ==
- Albert II of Namur (died 1067)
- Albert II of Tyrol (died 1120s)
- Albert II of Brandenburg (c. 1177–1220)
- Albert Suerbeer (1200–1273)
- Albert II of Meissen (1240–1314),
- Albert II of Saxony (1250–1298)
- Albert II, Duke of Brunswick (c. 1268–1318)
- Albert II (bishop of Halberstadt) (c. 1294–1358), Albert II of Brunswick-Lüneburg
- Albert II of Austria (1298–1358)
- Albert II of Anhalt-Zerbst (died 1362)
- Albert II of Mecklenburg (1318–1379)
- Albert II of Bavaria (1368–1397)
- Albert II of Holstein-Rendsburg (1369–1403)
- Albert II of Germany (1397–1439), King of Germany, Hungary, Croatia and Bohemia, Duke of Austria
- Albert II of Brunswick-Grubenhagen (1419–1485)
- Albert II of Mecklenburg-Stargard (1400s)
- Albert II of Hoya (1526–1563)
- Albert II of Brandenburg-Ansbach (1620–1667)
- Albert II of Belgium (born 1934), King of the Belgians
- Albert II of Monaco (born 1958), ruler of the principality of Monaco
- Albert von Thurn und Taxis (born 1983), German prince
