= County of Tyrol =

Estate of the Holy Roman Empire (1140–1806); county of Austria (1806–1919)

Coordinates: 46°54′58″N 11°12′22″E

(Princely) County of Tyrol (Gefürstete) Grafschaft Tirol (German) Contea (principesca) del Tirolo (Italian) Contea (da prinz) dl Tirol (Ladin)
- 1140–1919
- Flag Coat of arms

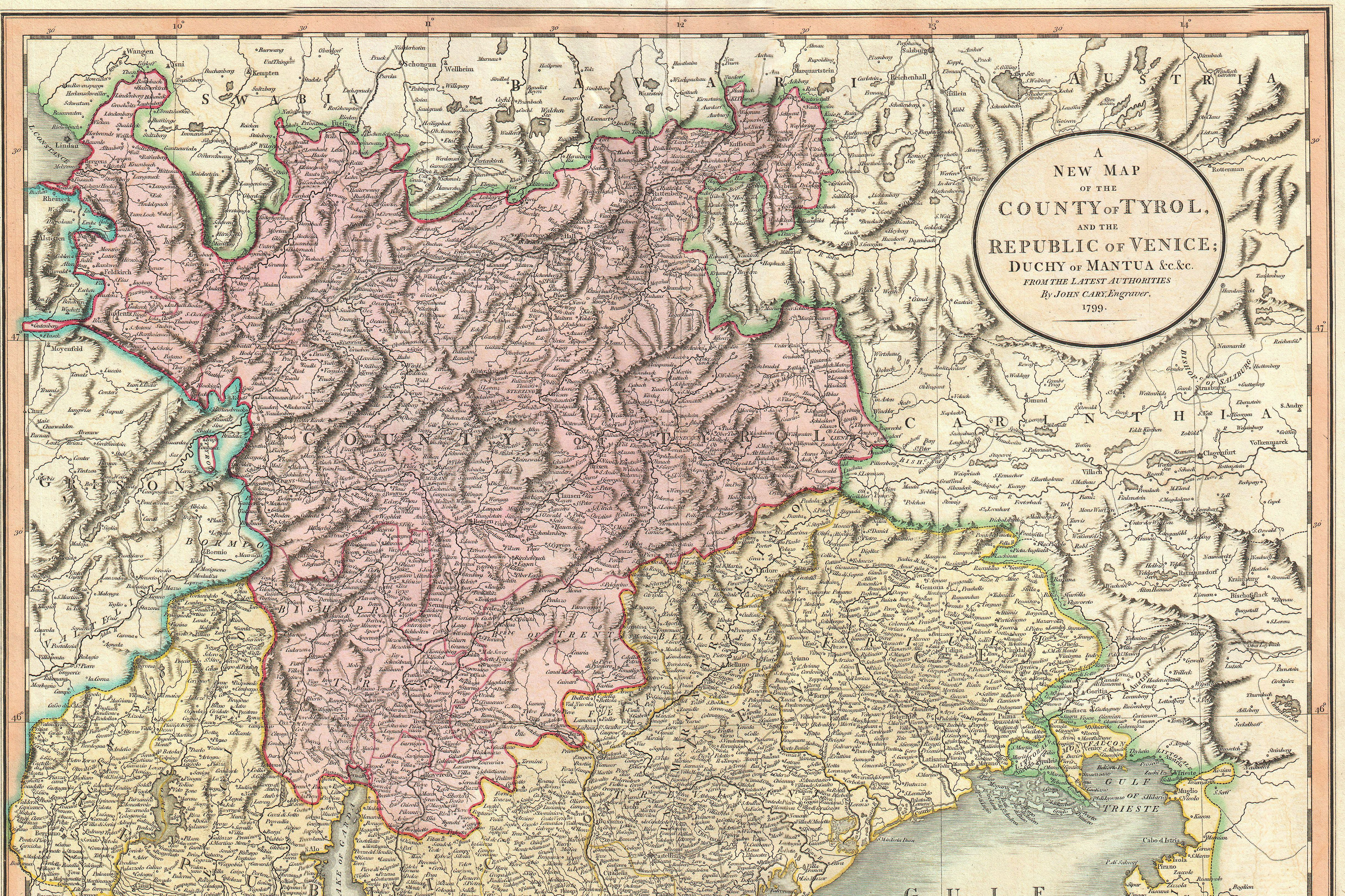
- Map of the County of Tyrol (1799)
- Status: State of the Holy Roman Empire (until 1806), Crown land of the Habsburg monarchy, of the Austrian Empire (from 1804) and of Cisleithanian Austria-Hungary (from 1867)
- Capital: Meran, formally until 1848; Innsbruck, residence from 1420
- Common languages: Southern Bavarian; Venetian language; Lombard language; Ladin language
- Government: County
- Historical era: Middle Ages
  - Created County: 1140
  - Bequeathed to House of Habsburg: 1363
  - Joined Austrian Circle: 1512
  - Incorporated Trent and Brixen: 1803
  - Restored to Austria: 1814
  - Partitioned by Treaty of St Germain: September 10, 1919

Area
  - Total: 26,482.14 km^{2} (10,224.81 sq mi)
Preceded by
Duchy of Bavaria
Bishopric of Trent
Prince-Bishopric of Brixen
Succeeded by
Republic of German-Austria
Kingdom of Italy

The (Princely) County of Tyrol was an estate of the Holy Roman Empire established about 1140. After 1253, it was ruled by the House of Gorizia and from 1363 by the House of Habsburg. In 1804, the County of Tyrol, unified with the secularised prince-bishoprics of Trent and Brixen, became a crown land of the Austrian Empire, then was part of Bavaria from 1805 to 1814 when it returned to Austrian rule. From 1867, it was a Cisleithanian crown land of Austria-Hungary.

Today the territory of the historic crown land is divided between the Italian autonomous region of Trentino-Alto Adige/Südtirol and the Austrian state of Tyrol. The two parts are today associated again in the Tyrol–South Tyrol–Trentino Euroregion.

== History ==
=== Establishment ===
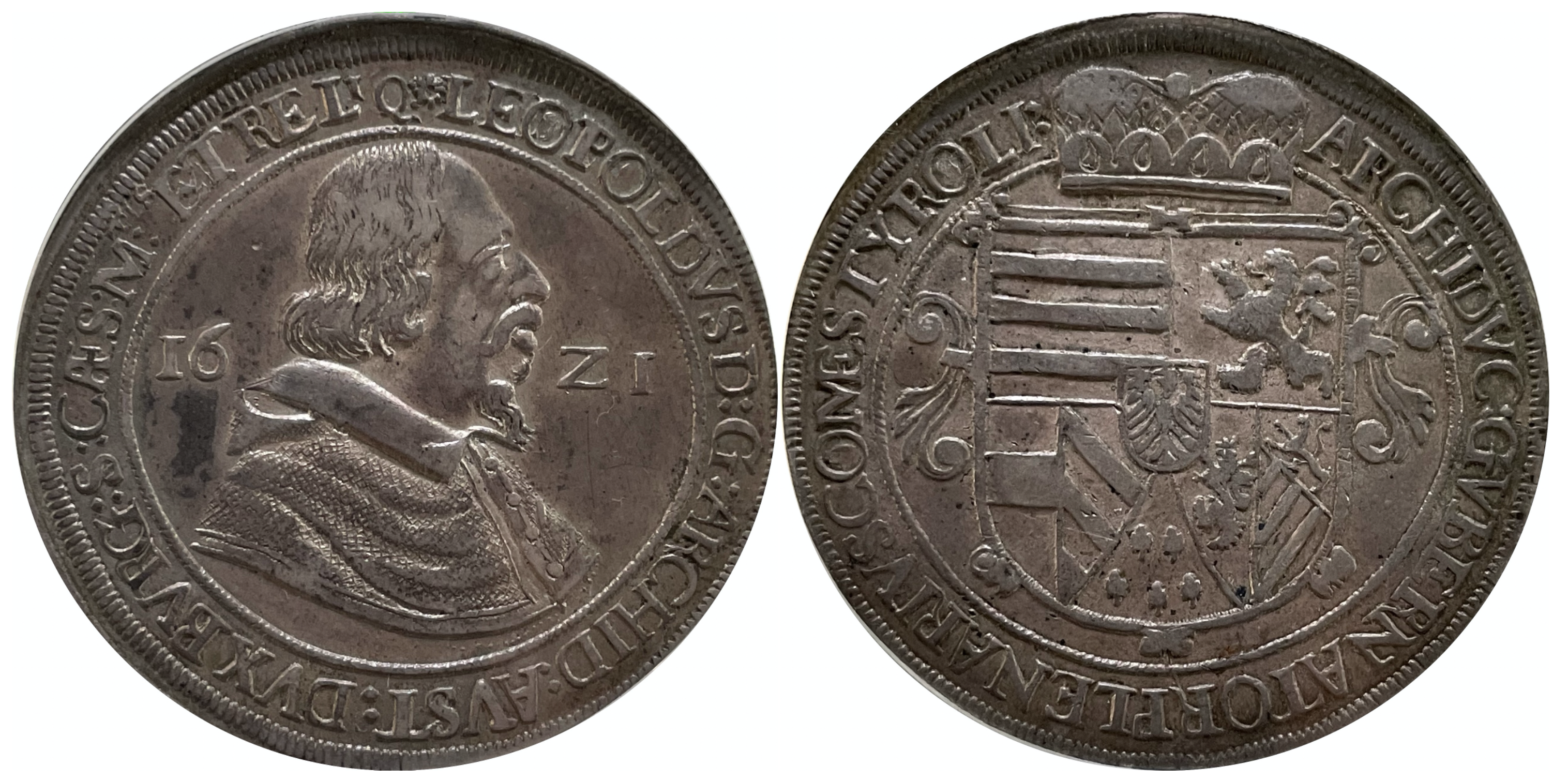
Silver coin: 1 thaler County of Tyrol, Leopold V – 1621

At least since King Otto I of Germany had conquered the former Lombard Kingdom of Italy in 961 and had himself crowned Holy Roman emperor in Rome, the principal passes of the Eastern Alps had become an important transit area. The German monarchs regularly traveled across the Brenner or Reschen Pass on their Italian expeditions aiming at papal coronation or the consolidation of Imperial rule.

In 1004 King Henry II of Germany separated the estates of Trent from the North Italian March of Verona and vested the bishops of Trent with comital rights. In 1027 Henry's Salian successor, Emperor Conrad II, granted the Trent bishops further estates around Bozen and in the Vinschgau region; at the same time, he vested the bishop of Brixen with the suzerainty in the Etschtal and Inntal, part of the German stem duchy of Bavaria under the rule of Conrad's son Henry III. Especially the Brixen bishops remained loyal supporters of the Salian rulers in the Investiture Controversy and in 1091 also received the Puster Valley from the hands of Emperor Henry IV.

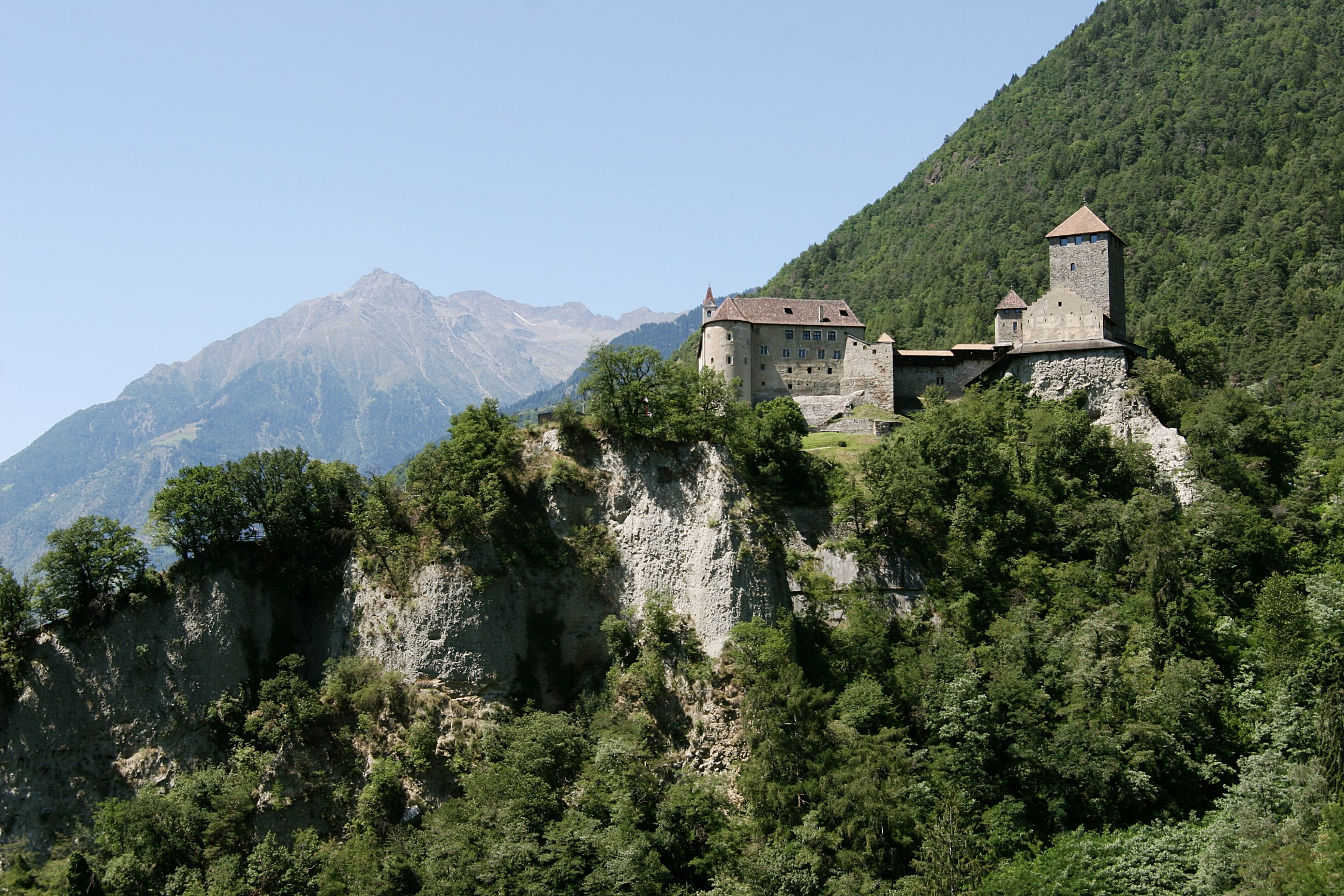
Tyrol Castle was the seat of the Counts of Tyrol and gave the region its name.

Documented from about 1140 onwards, the comital dynasty residing in Tyrol Castle near Meran held the office of Vogts (bailiffs) in the Trent diocese. They extended their territory over much of the region and came to surpass the power of the bishops, who were nominally their feudal lords. After the deposition of the Welf Duke Henry X of Bavaria in 1138, the counts of Tyrol strengthened their independence. When Henry the Lion was again enfeoffed with the Bavarian duchy by Emperor Frederick Barbarossa at the 1154 Imperial Diet in Goslar, his possessions no longer comprised the Tyrolean lands. The counts maintained that independence under the rising Bavarian Wittelsbach dynasty. In 1210, Count Albert IV of Tyrol also took over the Vogt office in the Bishopric of Brixen, prevailing against the rivalling counts of Andechs.

=== Gorizia-Tyrol ===
In 1253 Count Meinhard of Gorizia (Görz) inherited the Tyrolean lands by his marriage to Adelheid, daughter of the last Count Albert IV of Tyrol. When their sons divided their estate in 1271, the elder Meinhard II took Tyrol, for which he was recognized as an immediate lordship. He supported the German king Rudolph of Habsburg against his rival King Ottokar II of Bohemia. In reward, he received the Duchy of Carinthia with the Carniolan march in 1286.

In 1307 Meinhard's son Henry was elected King of Bohemia, After his death, he had one surviving daughter, Margaret Maultasch, who could gain the rule only over Tyrol. In 1342 she married Louis V of Wittelsbach, then Margrave of Brandenburg. The red eagle in Tyrol's coat of arms may derive from the Brandenburg eagle at the time when she and her husband ruled Tyrol and Brandenburg in personal union, though the Tyrolean eagle had already appeared in the 13th century.

Louis V died in 1361, followed by Margaret's son Meinhard III two years later. Lacking any descendants to succeed her, she bequeathed the county to Rudolph IV of Habsburg, Duke of Austria in 1363. He was recognized by the House of Wittelsbach in 1369. From that time onward, Tyrol was ruled by various lines of the Austrian House of Habsburg, who held the title of count.

=== Austria ===
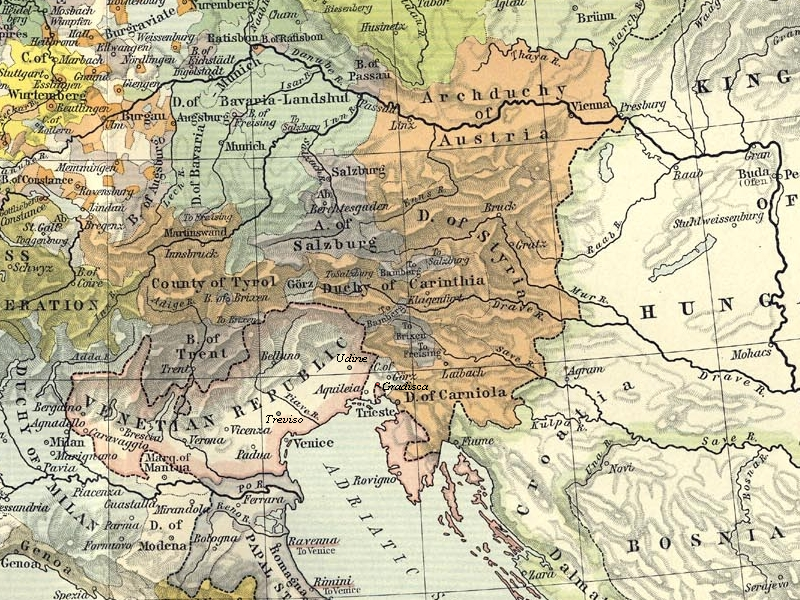
Map of the County of Tyrol and the Austrian Circle during the 15th century

After the Habsburg hereditary lands had been divided by the 1379 Treaty of Neuberg, Tyrol was ruled by the descendants of Duke Leopold III of Austria. After a second division within the Leopoldinian line in 1406, Duke Frederick IV of the Empty Pockets ruled them. In 1420 he made Innsbruck the Tyrolean capital. In 1490 his son and heir Sigismund renounced Tyrol and Further Austria in favour of his cousin German King Maximilian I of Habsburg. By then Maximilian I had re-united all Habsburg lands under his rule. In 1500 he also acquired the remaining Gorizia (Görz) territories around Lienz and the Puster Valley.

When Emperor Ferdinand I died in 1564, he bequeathed the rule over Tyrol and Further Austria to his second son Archduke Ferdinand II. Both territories thereafter fell to the younger sons of the Habsburg Emperors: Archduke Matthias in 1608 and Maximilian III in 1612. After the death of Archduke Sigismund Francis in 1665, all Habsburg lands were again under the united rule of the Emperor Leopold I.

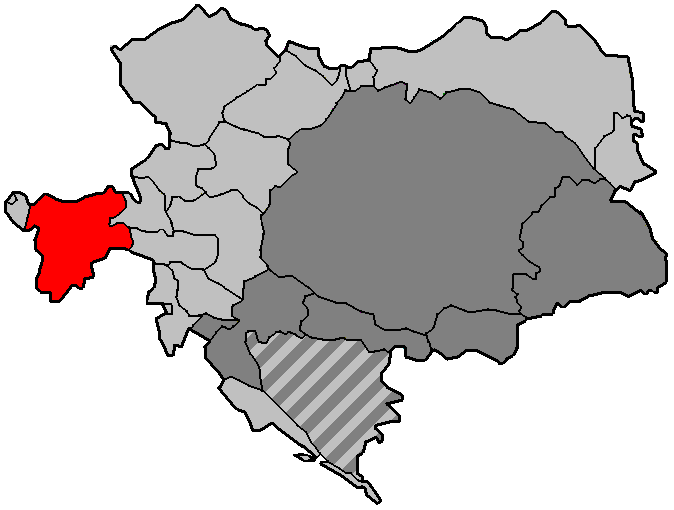
Austria-Hungary in 1914: Tyrolean crown land Cisleithania Transleithania

From the time of Maria Theresa (1740−1780) onward, Tyrol was governed by the central government of the Habsburg monarchy at Vienna in all matters of major importance. In 1803 the lands of the Prince-Bishoprics of Trent and Brixen were secularised and incorporated into the county.

=== Napoleonic Wars ===
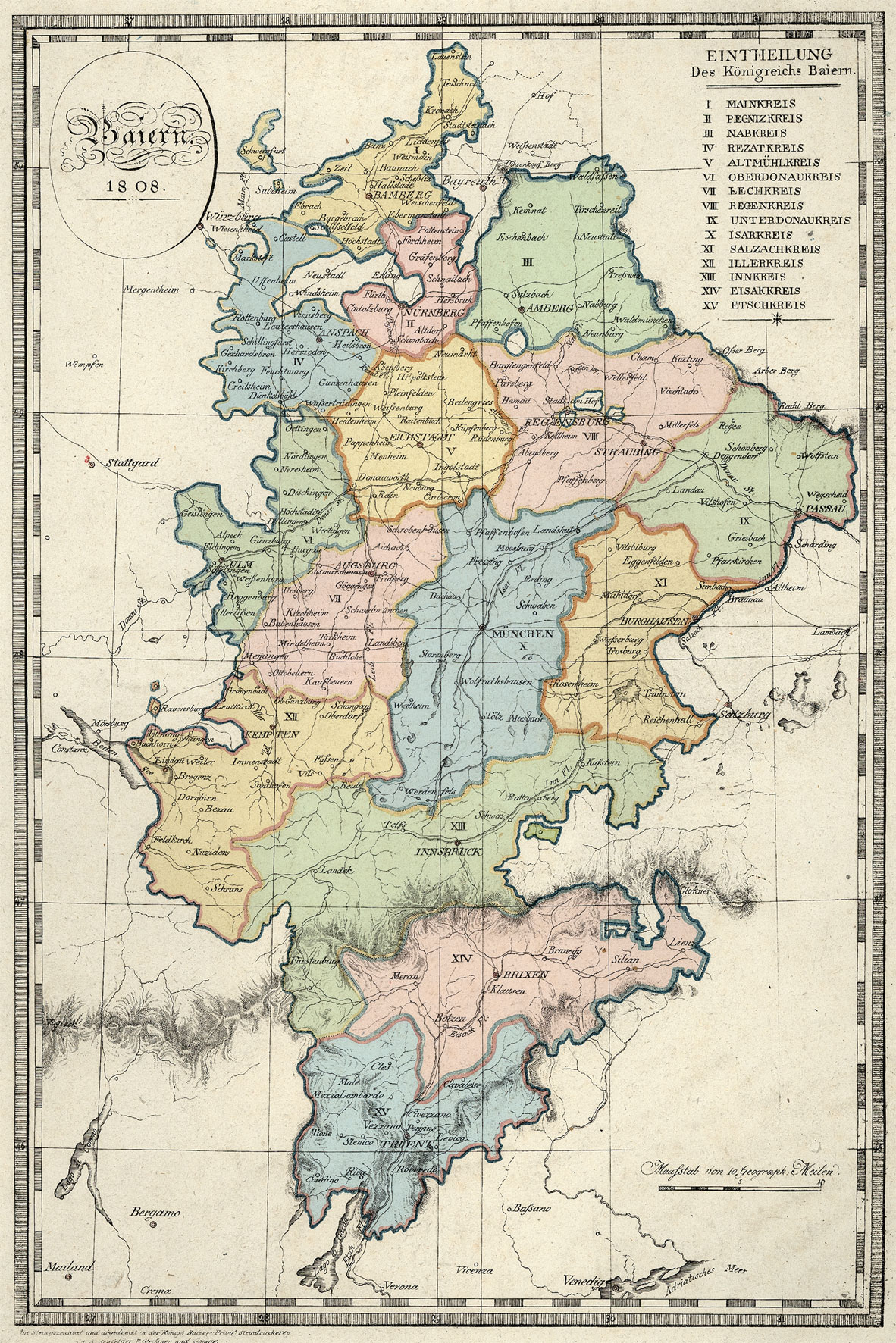
Administrative divisions of Bavaria in 1808.

Following defeat by Napoleon in 1805, Austria was forced to cede Tyrol to the Kingdom of Bavaria in the Peace of Pressburg. Tyrol as a part of Bavaria became a member of the Confederation of the Rhine in 1806.

The 1808 Bavarian constitution abolished traditional administrative divisions and replaced them with Kreise; Tyrol's territory was split up into:

- Etschkreis: roughly the modern Trentino province
- Eisackkreis: roughly the modern East Tyrol excluding Matrei and South Tyrol excluding the westernmost upper Etsch valley around Glurns
- Innkreis: roughly North Tyrol plus the upper Etsch valley and excluding the Zillertal and Brixental (which were part of Salzburg)

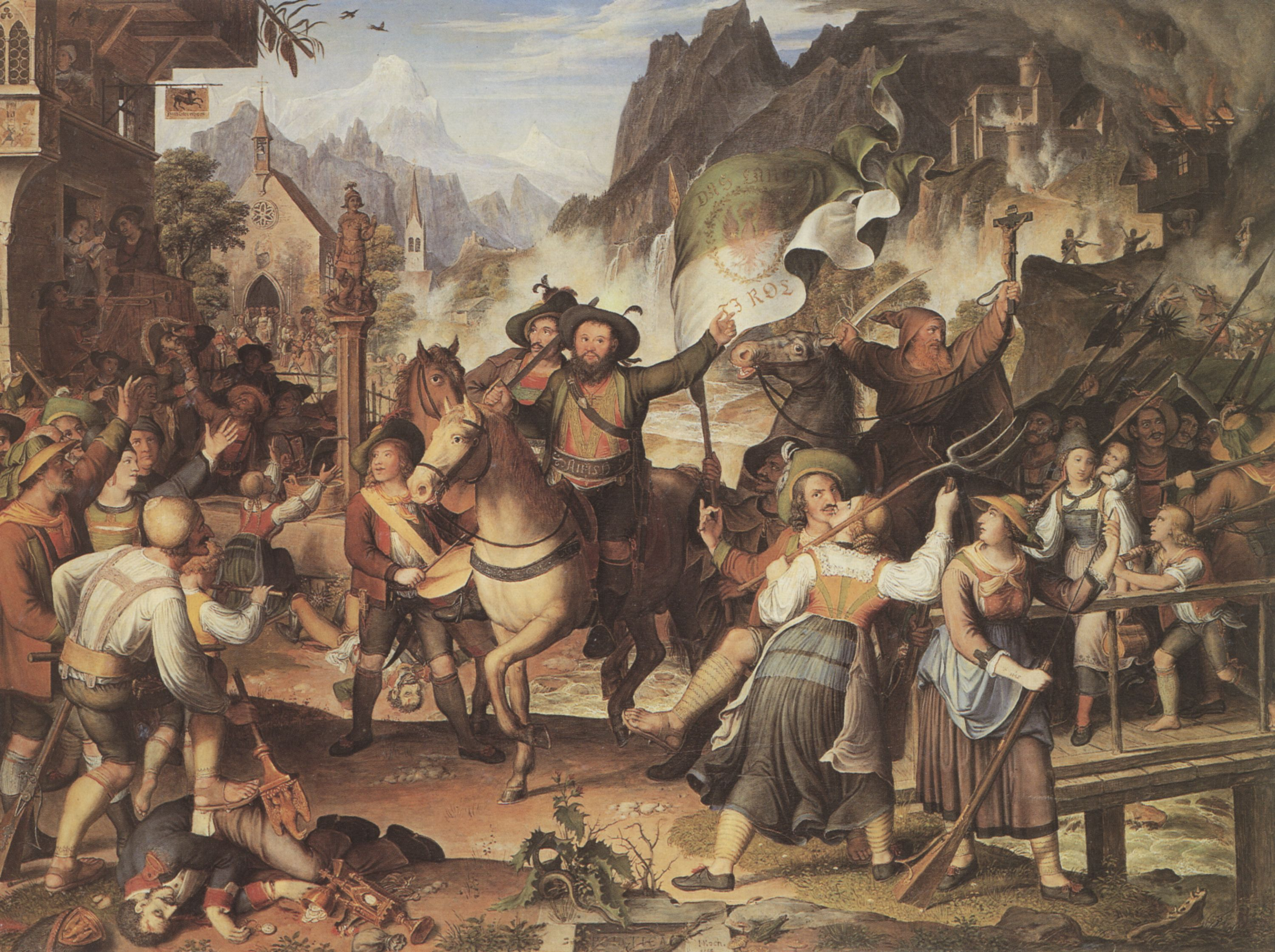
Andreas Hofer led the Tyrolean Rebellion against the invading French forces.

In 1809 the Tyroleans rose up against Bavarian authority and succeeded three times in defeating Bavarian and French troops trying to retake the country. Austria lost the War of the Fifth Coalition against France, and got harsh terms in the Treaty of Schönbrunn in 1809. Glorified as Tyrol's national hero, Andreas Hofer, the leader of the uprising, was executed in 1810 in Mantua. His forces had lost a fourth and final battle against the French and Bavarian forces.

In 1810 Bavaria was forced by France to cede southern Tyrol (the Etschkreis plus Bozen) to the Kingdom of Italy, most of which became the Department of Alto Adige, and the eastern part of the Eisackkreis (roughly modern East Tyrol) to the French Empire's Illyrian Provinces. The remainder of the Eisackkreis was transferred to the Innkreis (along with Werdenfels and the newly-acquired Zillertal), while parts of the Innkreis were transferred to other Kreise: the eastern part around St. Johann and Kitzbühel to the Salzachkreis; the Lechtal in the north-west to the Illerkreis. Tyrol remained divided between Bavaria and Napoleonic Italy for another four years.

=== Austrian Empire and Austria-Hungary ===
In 1814, by decisions of the Congress of Vienna, Tyrol was reunified and returned to Austria, becoming a crown land (Kronland) of the Austrian Empire. The formerly Salzburgian Zillertal, Brixental and Matrei were also permanently integrated into Tyrol. Administratively Vorarlberg was attached to the reconstituted Tyrol (formally as "the princely county of Tyrol with Vorarlberg" – die gefürstete Grafschaft Tirol mit Vorarlberg) as Kreis Bregenz until it became a crown land in its own right in the 1861 February Patent.

Tyrol-proper (i.e. excluding Vorarlberg) was until 1849 divided into six Kreise: Oberinnthal (or Imst), Unterinnthal (Schwaz), Pusterthal (Bruneck), Etsch (Bozen), Trient and Rovereto. In 1849 this was reduced to three: Innsbruck, Brixen and Trient, which broadly corresponded with the modern North Tyrol, South + East Tyrol and Trentino respectively. These Kreise were briefly divided into modern-style political districts but were recentralised and divided into smaller "office districts" from 1853.

Following the Austro-Hungarian Compromise of 1867 Tyrol was a Cisleithanian (Austrian) crown land within Austria-Hungary. The Kreise and office districts were abolished and political districts re-introduced in 1868.

=== End of the County ===
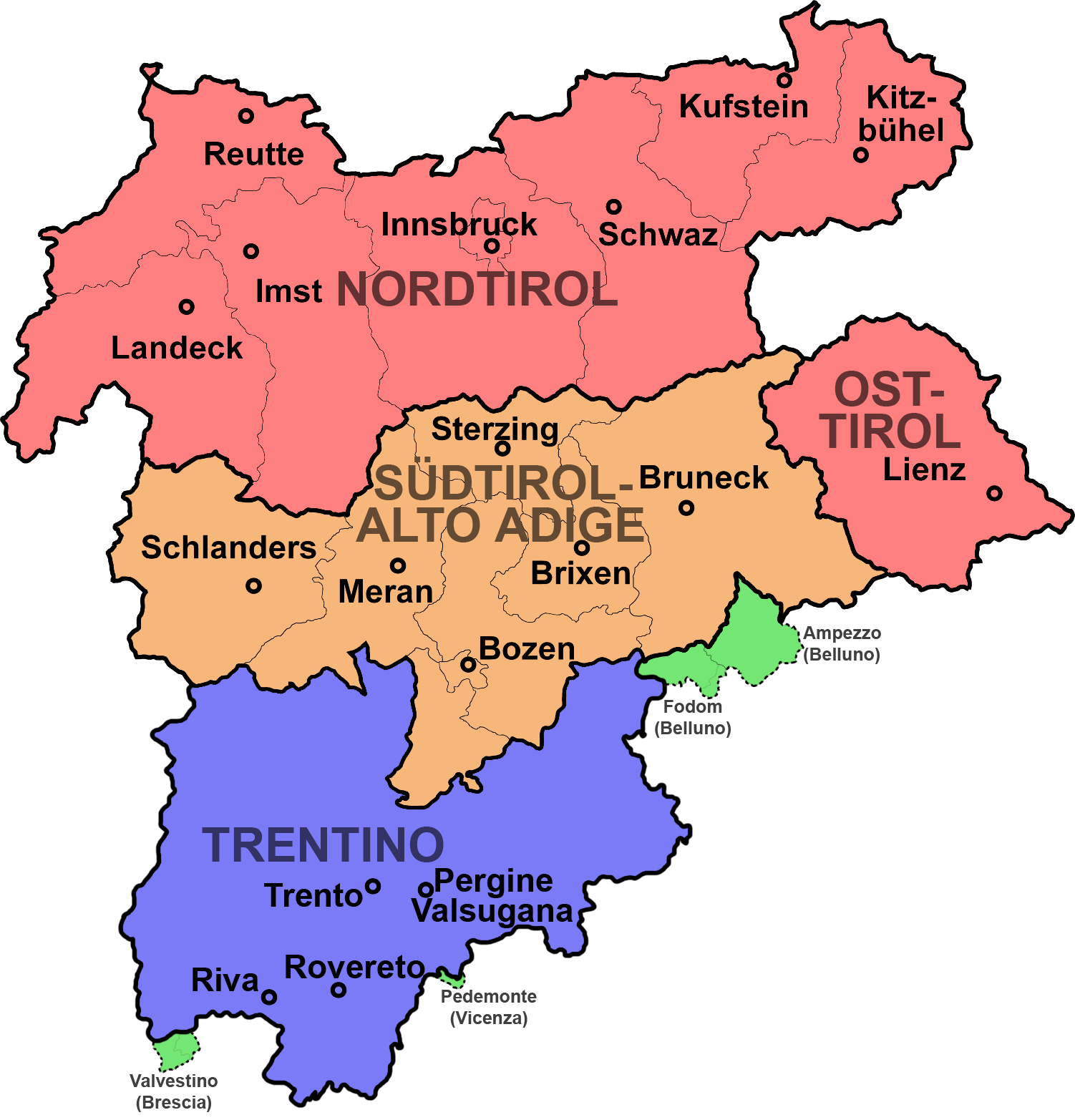
The former crown land of Tyrol today: State of Tyrol (Austria) South Tyrol (Italy) Trentino (Italy) Parts of the former county now within other Italian provinces

After World War I, the victors settled border changes. The Treaty of Saint-Germain of 1919 ruled according to the 1915 London Pact, that the southern part of the Austrian crown land of Tyrol had to be ceded to the Kingdom of Italy, including the territory of the former Trent bishopric, roughly corresponding to the modern-day Trentino, as well as the south of the medieval Tyrol county, the present-day province of South Tyrol. Italy thus took control of the strategically important Alpine water divide at the Brenner Pass and over the south of Tyrol proper with its large German-speaking majority. Since 1949 both parts form the autonomous Italian Trentino-Alto Adige/Südtirol region. The northern part of Tyrol retained by the First Austrian Republic today forms the Austrian State of Tyrol with its East Tyrol exclave.

In 1945 following World War II, Austrian attempts and South Tyrolean petitions to reunite South Tyrol with Austria were unsuccessful; Italy retained control. From 1972 onwards, the Italian Republic has granted further autonomy to the Trentino-Alto Adige/Südtirol region.

== Counts of Tyrol ==
=== House of Tirol ===
- Albert I (–1078), Count of Eurasburg
- Albert II (1078–1101), maybe son of Albert I
- Albert III (1101–1165), son of Albert II
- Berthold I (1165–1180), son of Albert II
- Berthold II (1180–1181), son of Berthold I
- Henry I (1181–1202), son of Berthold I
- Albert IV (1202–1253), son of Henry I

Male line extinct.

=== House of Meinhardin ===
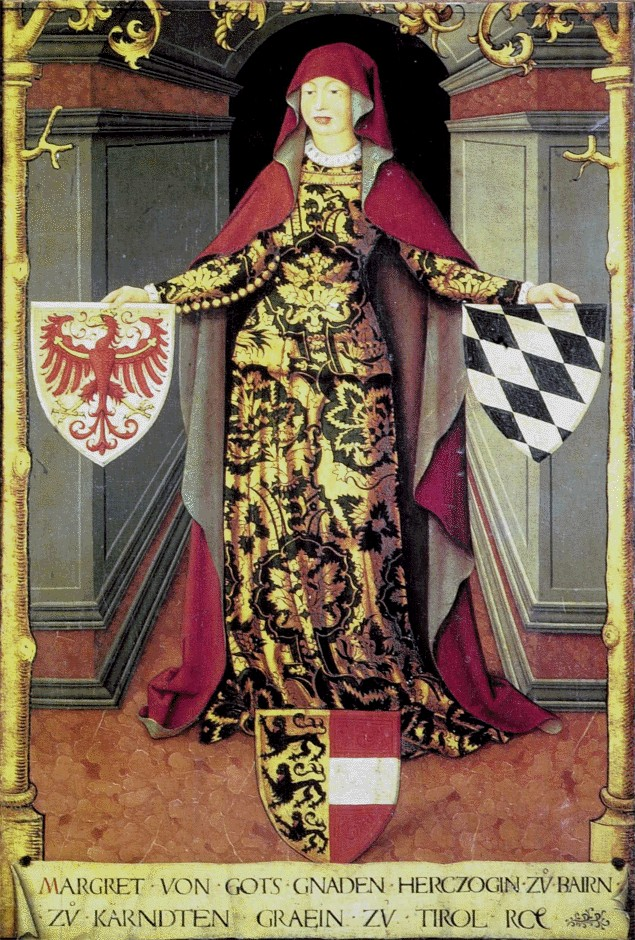
Margaret, Countess of Tyrol, heiress of the Meinhardin dynasty

County bequeathed to Albert's son-in-law:

- Meinhard I 1253–1258, also Count of Gorizia since 1231
- Meinhard II 1258–1295, also Count of Gorizia until 1271, Duke of Carinthia and Margrave of Carniola from 1286, jointly with:
  - Albert V 1258–1271, brother, also Count of Gorizia until 1304
  - Albert VI, son, until 1292
- Henry II 1295–1335, son of Meinhard II, also Duke of Carinthia, King of Bohemia 1306 and 1307–1310, jointly with his brothers
  - Louis, until 1305
  - Otto, until 1310

Male line extinct, Countess Margaret, daughter of Henry II, married to:

- John Henry of Luxembourg 1335–1341;

divorced, secondly to:

- Louis of Wittelsbach 1341–1361, also Margrave of Brandenburg 1323–1351, Duke of Bavaria from 1347, succeeded by
- Meinhard III 1361–1363, son.

Line extinct.

=== House of Habsburg ===
County bequeathed to

- Rudolph IV of Habsburg 1363–1365, also Duke of Austria, Styria and Carinthia since 1358, Duke of Carniola from 1364
- Leopold I 1365–1386, brother, also Duke of Austria until 1379, Duke of Styria, Carinthia and Carniola (Inner Austria according to the 1379 Treaty of Neuberg), jointly with his brother
  - Albert IV until 1379, sole Duke of Austria from 1379
- William 1386–1406, son of Leopold I, also ruler of Inner Austria, jointly with his brother
  - Leopold II 1396–1406, regent of Tyrol and Further Austria (until 1402), regent of Austria from 1406
- Frederick of the Empty Pockets 1406–1439, brother, also regent of Further Austria since 1402
- Sigismund 1439–1490, son, also ruler of Further Austria, deposed

Line extinct, Habsburg lands re-unified under

- Maximilian I 1490–1519, King of Germany (King of the Romans) since 1486, Archduke of Austria from 1493, Holy Roman Emperor ("Emperor-elect") from 1508.

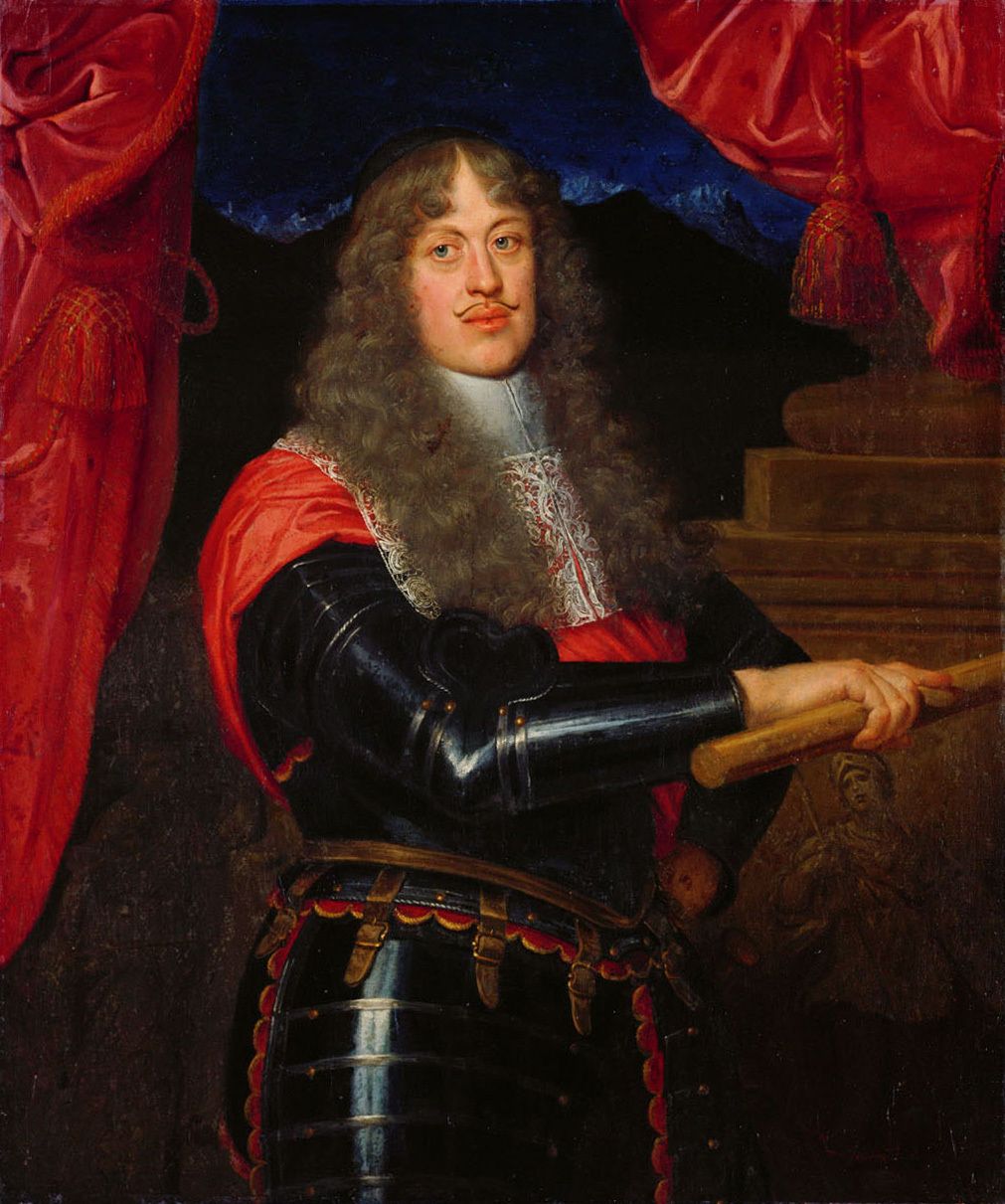
Archduke Sigismund Francis, last of the Tyrolean line of the Habsburg dynasty

Habsburg regents of Tyrol and Further Austria:

- Ferdinand II 1564–1595, second son of Emperor Ferdinand I
- Maximilian III 1612–1618, son
- Leopold V 1619–1632, younger brother of Emperor Ferdinand II
- Ferdinand Charles 1632–1662, son, with his mother
  - Claudia de' Medici 1632–1646, as regent
- Sigismund Francis 1663–1665, brother

Line extinct, Habsburg lands re-unified under

- Leopold I 1665–1705, Holy Roman Emperor since 1658.

== See also ==
- Tyrol
- Tyrol (federal state)
- South Tyrol
- Trentino
- History of Tyrol
- Tyrol–South Tyrol–Trentino Euroregion
