= Albert IV of Tyrol =

Count of Tyrol

Albert III. / AdalbertIV.
- Count of Tyrol
- Born: c. 1180
- Died: 22 July 1253
- Buried: Stams
- Noble family: House of Tyrol
- Spouse: Uta of Frontenhausen-Lechsgemünd
- Father: Henry I, Count of Tyrol
- Mother: Agnes of Wangen

Albert IV (or Albert III, depending on the counting scheme; c. 1180 – 22 July 1253) was Count of Tyrol from 1202 until his death, the last from the original House of Tirol. He also served as Vogt of the bishoprics of Trent and Brixen.

== Life ==
He was the son of Count Henry I (d. 14 June 1190) and Agnes of Wangen, daughter of Count Adalbero I. He was still a minor when his father died in 1190, and only began to rule independently in 1202. He inherited the office of a Vogt of Trent from his father; in 1210, Bishop Conrad also appointed him Vogt of Brixen.

When in 1209 the Counts of Andechs-Merania were banned for their alleged role in the murder of the Hohenstaufen king Philip of Swabia at the wedding of Duke Otto I of Merania in Bamberg, Albert took over their sovereign rights in the Inn, Wipp, Eisack, and Gader valleys. Shaping the independent County of Tyrol, he consolidated his position by quickly recognizing the now undisputed supremacy of Philip's rival, the Welf emperor Otto IV. After Emperor Otto's death in 1218, he again switched sides and became a loyal supporter of the Hohenstaufen ruler Frederick II. In 1217, he and Bishop Bertold of Brixen joined the Fifth Crusade.

Albert had no sons, so he made sure his daughters would be allowed to inherit. In 1234 he married his daughter Elisabeth (d. 1256) off to the Andechs duke Otto II of Merania and his other daughter, Adelaide (d. 1279), to Count Meinhard of Gorizia, concluding mutual contracts of inheritance with both his sons-in-law. As a result, Albert acquired the Tyrolean possessions held by Otto II of Merania upon his death in 1248 and could also seize the lands of the extinct counts of Eppan in the same year.

In the fierce controversy after the deposition of Emperor Frederick II by Pope Innocent IV in 1245, Albert remained a protagonist of the imperial party and took the occasion to invade the ecclesiastical territories of Bishop-elect Philip of Salzburg. In 1252, however, Albert and his son-in-law Meinhard were taken prisoner at Greifenburg by the united forces of Philip and his father Duke Bernard of Carinthia. Held in custody in Friesach, they were not released until December, after they ceded important possessions in Upper Carinthia, paid a large ransom and put up Meinhard's two sons as hostages.

Albert IV died the next year and was buried in Stams. His inheritance was at first divided between his sons-in-law Meinhard and Count Gebhard IV of Hischberg, the second husband of his daughter Elisabeth. Gebhard had no children, so after his death, Meinhard's son Meinhard II re-united Albert's possessions.

During his lifetime, Albert had tried to unite his possessions in the Tyrol area into a single county. In 1254, this entity was called the dominium Tyrolis or comecia Tyrolis.

== Marriage and issue ==
Around 1211 Albert married Uta (d. 1254), daughter of the Bavarian count Henry II of Frontenhausen-Lechsgemünd (d. 1208). Albert and Uta had two daughters:

- Adelaide (c. 1218/1220 – 26 May 1279), married to Count Meinhard I of Gorizia (d. 1258)
- Elisabeth (c. 1220/1225 – 10 October 1256), married:
  1. in 1239 to Duke Otto II of Andechs-Merania (d. 19 June 1248)
  2. in 1249, to Count Gebhard IV of Hirschberg (d. 1275)

Albert IV of Tyrol House of Tyrol Born: c. 1180 Died: 22 July 1253
Preceded by Henry I	Count of Tyrol; 1202-1253	Succeeded by Meinhard I
