= Henry I of Tyrol =

Count of Tyrol, Austrian state

Henry I
- Count of Tyrol
- Died: 14 June 1190
- Noble family: House of Tyrol
- Spouse: Agnes of Wangen
- Father: Berthold I, Count of Tyrol
- Mother: Agnes(?) of Ortenburg

Henry I (died 14 June 1190) was Count of Tyrol from 1180 until his death.

Henry was a younger son of Count Berthold I of Tyrol and his wife Agnes(?), a daughter of Count Otto I of Ortenburg. In 1180 he succeeded his father as Tyrolean count, jointly with his brother Berthold II. After Berthold II died in 1181, Henry I ruled alone.

Henry married Agnes, a daughter of Lord Adalbero of Wangen and sister of Bishop Frederick of Trent. The couple had the following children:

- Albert IV (d. 1253)
- a daughter, who married Meinhard II, Count of Gorizia
- Agnes, married Count Henry II of Eschenlohe (d. 1272)
- Matilda, married Count Berthold III of Eschenlohe (d. 1260)

Henry I of Tyrol House of Tyrol Died: 14 June 1190
Preceded by Berthold I	Count of Tyrol; 1180-1190	Succeeded by Albert IV
