= Albert II of Tyrol =

Count of Tyrol

Albert II (German: Adalbert; died about 1125) was a progenitor of the Albertine House of Tyrol. He was documented as a count ruling the Bavarian estates in the Inn, Wipp and Eisack valleys of the Eastern Alps.

Albert inherited the Alpine lordships from his father, Count Albert I (d. about 1100), who descended from Eurasburg (Iringsburg) in Upper Bavaria. He had been a loyal supporter of King Henry IV during the fierce Investiture Controversy, in opposition to Duke Welf of Bavaria. In turn, the king vested him with wide-ranging autonomy upon Welf's deposition in 1077.

Albert II married Adelaide (d. about 1153), a daughter of Count Berthold of Dießen-Andechs. His sons Albert III (d. 1165) and later, Berthold I succeeded him as Counts of Tyrol.

Under Albert II, the construction of Tyrol Castle began in the early 12th century. The ancestral seat was finished during 1160, under the direction of his younger son, Count Berthold I.
