= Berthold I of Tyrol =

Count of Tyrol (died 1180)

Berthold I
- Count of Tyrol
- Died: 7 March 1180
- Noble family: House of Tyrol
- Spouse: Agnes of Ortenburg
- Issue: Berthold II, Count of Tyrol; Henry I, Count of Tyrol
- Father: Albert II, Count of Tyrol
- Mother: Adelaide of Diessen-Andechs

Berthold I (died 7 March 1180) was Count of Tyrol from about 1165 until his death.

== Biography ==
He was a younger son of Count Albert II and his wife, Adelaide of Diessen-Andechs. The Tyrolean counts were able to strengthen their autonomy from Bavaria after the Welf duke Henry the Proud was deposed by King Conrad III of Germany in 1139. About 1165, Berthold succeeded his elder brother Albert III as sole Count of Tyrol.

Berthold I was married to his cousin Agnes (1149–1207), a daughter of Otto I of Ortenburg, who was himself a son of Count Albert I of Tyrol. Upon his death, he was succeeded by his sons Berthold II and Henry I,

Berthold I of Tyrol House of Tyrol Died: 7 March 1180
Preceded by Albert III	Count of Tyrol; 1165–1180	Succeeded by Berthold II and Henry I
