= Inntal =

Valley in Switzerland, Austria and Germany

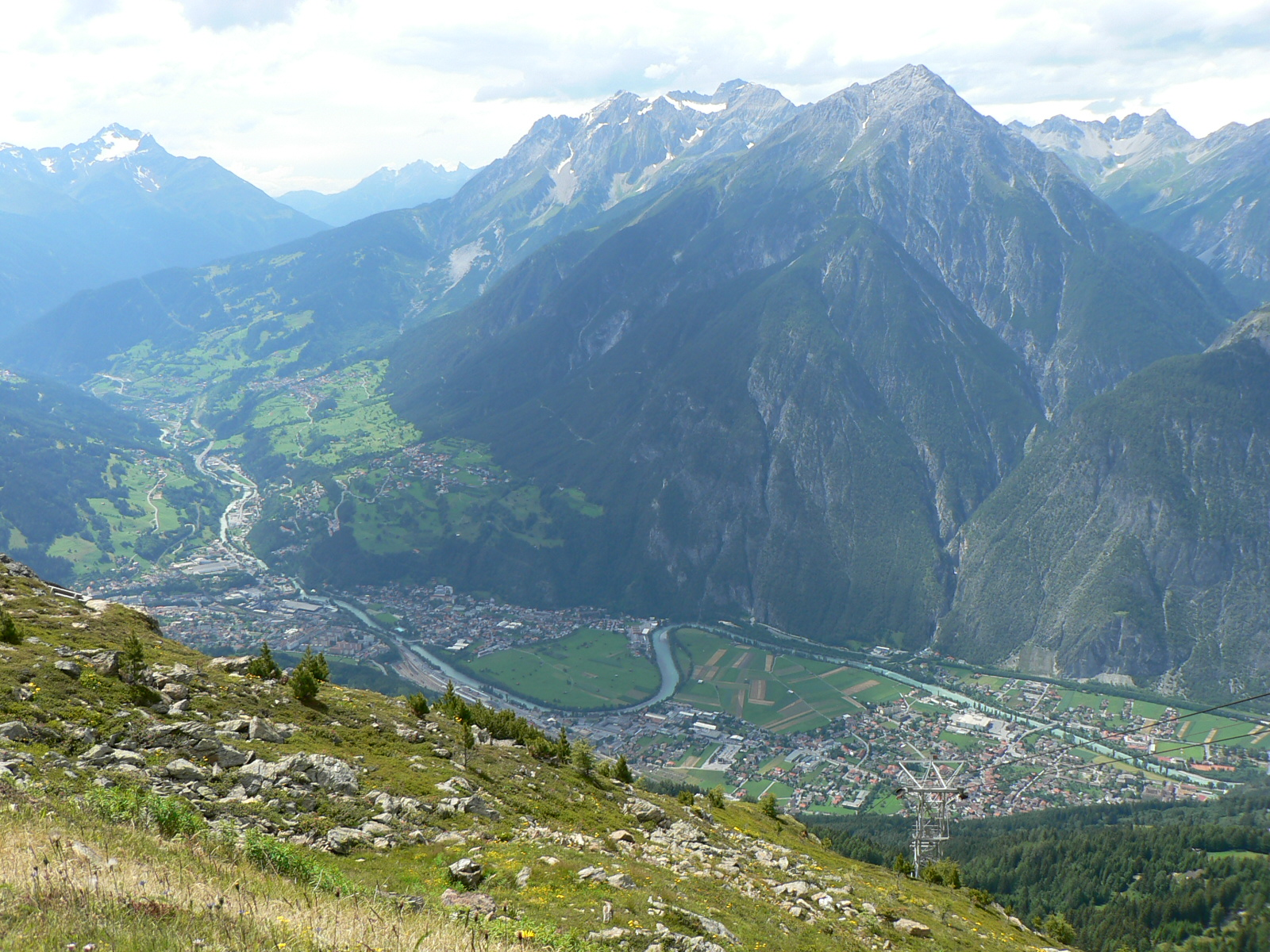
The Inntal, as seen from the Krahberg.

The Inntal is the valley containing the Inn river in Switzerland, Austria and Germany. The valley has a total length of 517 km and the biggest city located in Inntal is Innsbruck.

The valley is divided into the following sections based on regional and national frontiers:

- Engadin (Switzerland)
- Tyrolean Inntal (Tirol, Austria)
- Bavarian Inntal (Bavaria, Germany)
- Upper Austrian Inntal (Upper Austria, Austria)
