= Lugos District =

Administrative district of Voivodeship of Serbia and Banat of Temeschwar

Coordinates: 45.6839°N 21.9039°E

Lugos District District von Lugos, Kreis Lugos (German)
- district of the Voivodeship of Serbia and Banat of Temeschwar
- 1851–1860
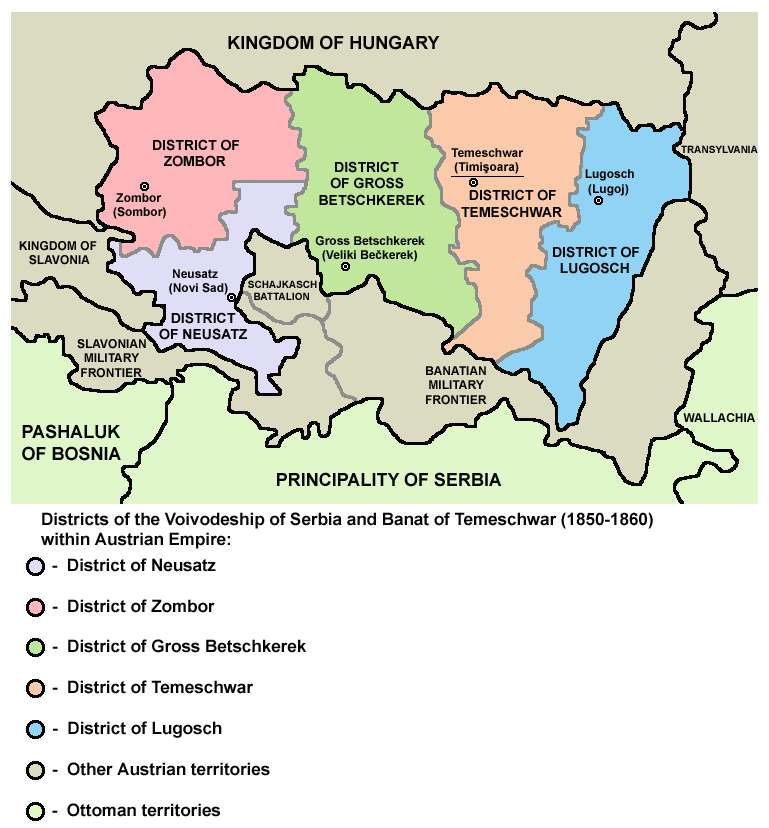
- Districts of the Voivodeship of Serbia and Banat of Temeschwar; Lugos District is shown in blue
- Capital: Lugos (Romanian: Lugoj)
- History
  - Established: 1851
  - Disestablished: 1860
Preceded by	Succeeded by
Temeschwar-Karasch District	Krassó County
- Today part of: Romania; Serbia (Banatska Subotica, Dobričevo)

Lugos District (contemporary German: District von Lugos; Kreis Lugos or Lugoser Kreis from 1854) was one of five administrative districts (originally Districte, modern spelling Distrikte; Kreise, lit. 'circles', from 1854) of the Voivodeship of Serbia and Banat of Temeschwar (a crown land within the Austrian Empire) from 1851 to 1860. Its administrative centre was Lugos (Romanian: Lugoj, German: Lugosch).

== History ==
The Voivodeship of Serbia and Banat of Temeschwar crown land was formed in 1849. In 1851, it was divided into five districts: Lugos, Temesvár, Groß-Becskerek, Zombor and Neusatz. Lugos District was based on the former territory of the Hungarian Krassó County.

In German the original term used for these subdivisions was Districte (modern spelling Distrikte). In 1851 they were divided into subdivisions called (politische) Bezirke, usually translated as '(political) districts'.

In Bach's reforms from 1853 (formally applied to the crown land in 1854) the Districte became Kreise, a form of administrative division already in use across much of the non-Hungarian part of the Empire since the 18th century. The term Kreis, literally 'circle', is also often translated as 'district'. The subdivisions of the Kreise were also called Bezirke in German, or Amtsbezirke ('office districts', in reference to the Bezirksämter or 'district offices' which ran them) to distinguish them from other types of Bezirk. The change of name was not superficial – different political, administrative and judicial structures were used in each subdivision type. (See also Districts of Austria § Habsburg Monarchy and Austrian Empire.)

In 1860, the crown land and its five districts were abolished; the territory of the Lugos District reverted to Krassó County under Hungary.

== Geography ==
The Lugos District comprised the easternmost parts of Banat (the Military Frontier notwithstanding). It shared borders with the Temesvár District to the west, the Banat Military Frontier in the south and east, the Grand Principality of Transylvania (initially the Karlsburger Kreis, Kreis Broos from 1854) in the north-east, and the Hungarian Arad County in the north (all parts of the Austrian Empire). Until 1849 it had been the Hungarian Krassó County.

Today it lies almost entirely within Romania, with some small parts (the settlements of Banatska Subotica and Dobričevo and some small areas of unsettled land) within Serbia (Vojvodina).

== Subdivisions ==
In 1851 Lugos District was subdivided into 4 political districts (politische Bezirke), which were structurally akin to the modern districts of Austria (names as defined, modern German and other languages in parentheses):

- Lugos (German: Lugosch; Romanian: Lugoj; Serbo-Croatian: Lugoš)
- Facset (German: Fatschet; Romanian: Făget; Hungarian: Facsád)
- Oravitza (German: Orawitz; Romanian: Oravița; Hungarian: Oravicabánya; Serbo-Croatian: Oravica)
- Boksan (German: (Deutsch-)Bokschan; Romanian: Bocșa (Montană); Hungarian: Boksánbánya)

The city of Lugos was separate from the political districts; the Lugos district covered the area around the city, which acted as its seat/capital (i.e. it was a statutory city).

In 1854 Lugos District (now a Kreis) was subdivided into 4 'office districts' (Amtsbezirke) (names as defined):

1. Lugos
2. Facset
3. Oraviza
4. Bogsan
