= Banatski Despotovac =

Banatski Despotovac Банатски Деспотовац
- Village (Selo)
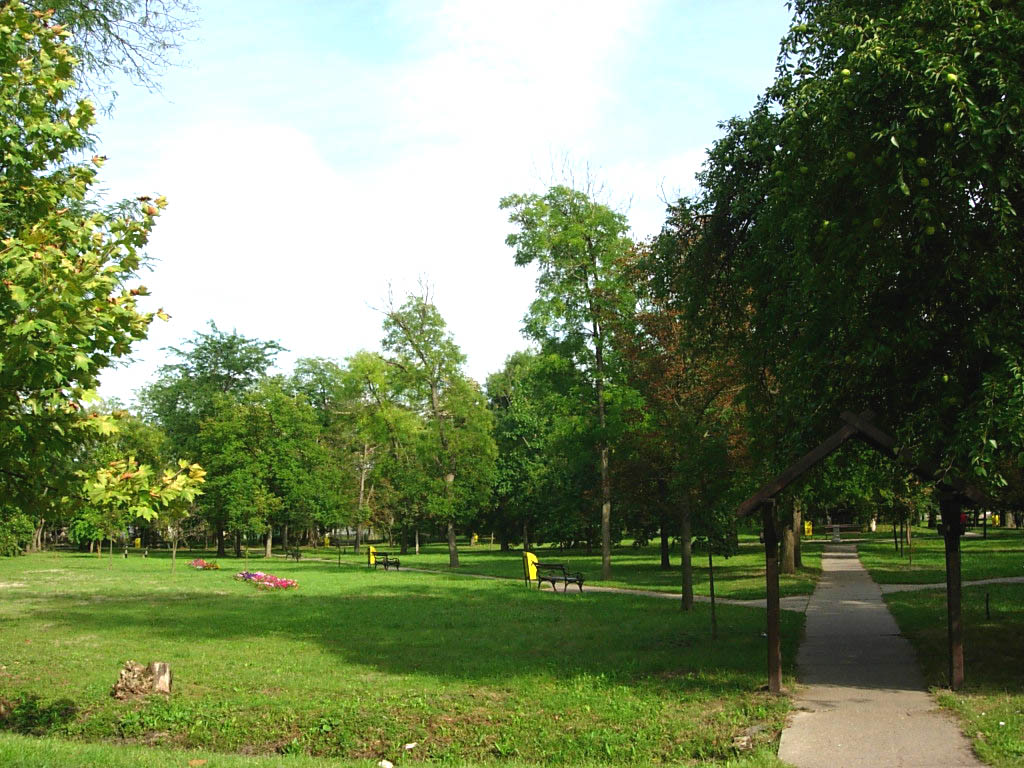
- Park in the village center

- Location within Serbia Banatski Despotovac (Serbia) Banatski Despotovac (Europe)
- Coordinates: 45°22′35″N 20°18′03″E
- Country: Serbia
- Province: Vojvodina
- District: Central Banat
- Municipalities: Zrenjanin
- Elevation: 53 m (174 ft)

Population (2022)
  - Total: 917
- Time zone: UTC+1 (CET)
  - Summer (DST): UTC+2 (CEST)
- Postal code: 23242
- Area code: +381(0)23
- Car plates: ZR

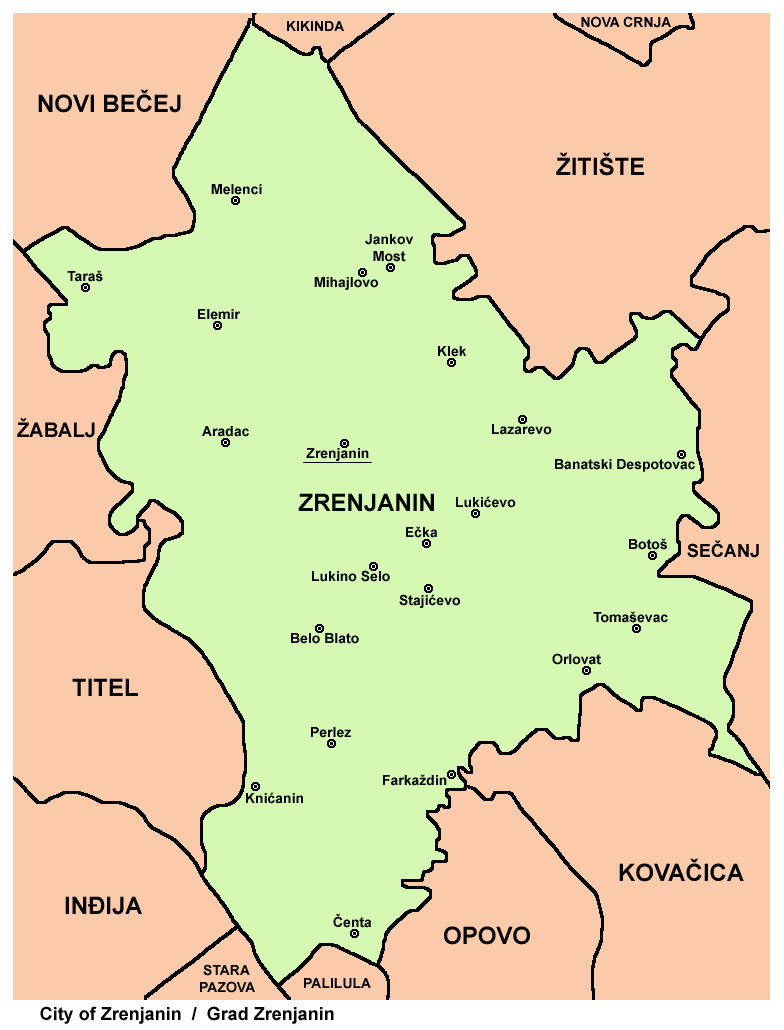
Map of municipal area of Zrenjanin - village of Banatski Despotovac located in the east

Banatski Despotovac (Serbian Cyrillic: Банатски Деспотовац; Hungarian: Ernőháza) is a village in Serbia. It is located in the municipal area of the City of Zrenjanin, in the Central Banat District, Vojvodina province. The village has a Serb ethnic majority (98.2%) and its population numbers 1,620 people (2002 census).

== Name ==
In Serbian, the village is known as Banatski Despotovac or Банатски Деспотовац (formerly also Ernestovac / Ернестовац), in Hungarian as Ernőháza, and in German as Ernsthausen.

The current Serbian name for the village is derived from the Serbian word "despot" (a Medieval ruling title), while the word "banatski" refers to its location in the region of Banat in contrast to the town of Despotovac located in Šumadija and Western Serbia.

== History ==
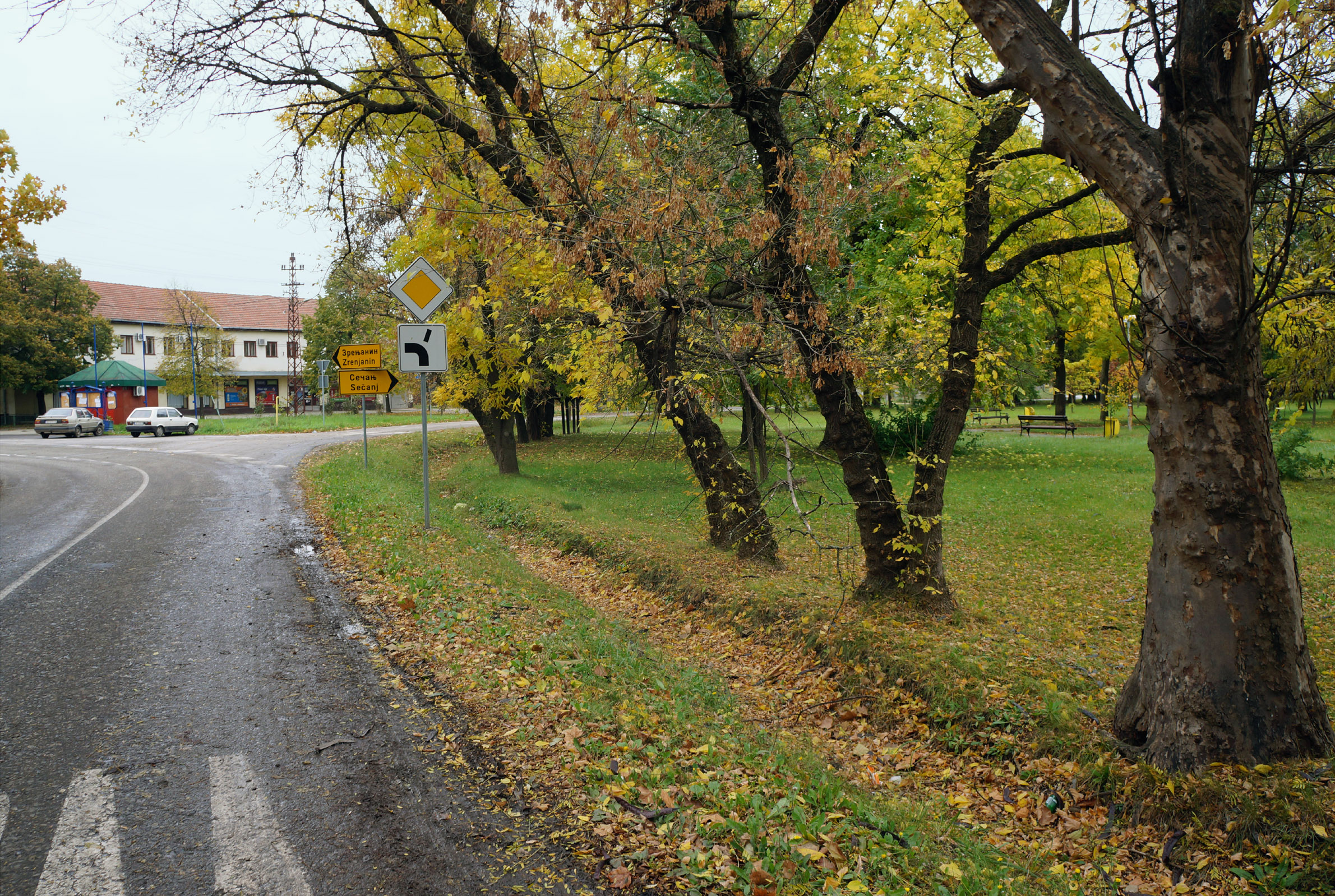
Street in Banatski Despotovac

The village was founded during Austrian administration in 1822 (according to other sources in 1828) and was initially populated by Danube Swabian settlers. It was named Ernsthausen/Ernestovac after an Austrian army officer Feldmarschalleutnant Ernest Kiss de Elemer. The settlers were exclusively Roman Catholic in faith, and in 1844 they built a large schoolhouse which was used until 1944.

Administratively, the village was part of the Torontal County within the Austrian Kingdom of Hungary. In 1848–49, the village was part of autonomous Serbian Vojvodina and in 1849–1860 part of the Voivodeship of Serbia and Banat of Temeschwar, a separate Austrian crown land. It was part of the Batschka-Torontal District (1849–1850) and Großbetschkerek District (1850–1860) within the voivodeship. After the abolishment of the voivodeship in 1860, the village was again included into Torontal County.

On 8 December 1888 the newly built Gothic style Roman Catholic church was inaugurated (it was subsequently razed by the communists in 1945). In 1910 census, majority of village inhabitants spoke the German language.

During the 19th and early 20th century Danube Swabians played an important role in developing the economy. Sepp Janko, chairman of the Schwäbisch-Deutscher Kulturbund (Danube Swabian German Cultural Association), a fascist collaborationist who fled to Argentina, where he died, was born here in 1905. In 1918, the village firstly became part of the Banat Republic, then (as part of the Banat, Bačka and Baranja region) part of the Kingdom of Serbia and finally part of the Kingdom of Serbs, Croats and Slovenes (later renamed to Yugoslavia). In 1918–1919, the village was part of the Banat, Bačka and Baranja region and also (from 1918 to 1922) part of the Veliki Bečkerek district. From 1922 to 1929, the village was part of the Belgrade Oblast and from 1929 to 1941 part of the Danube Banovina. The 1930 census showed a population of 2,421 people.

From 1941 to 1944, the village was under Axis occupation and was part of the Banat autonomous region within German-occupied Serbia. Since 1944, the village is part of autonomous Yugoslav Vojvodina, which (from 1945) was part of new socialist Serbia within Yugoslavia. In 1944, after World War II ended, a large percentage of Yugoslav citizens of German ethnicity left from the area, together with defeated German army. Those who remained in the area were sent to communist prison camps. After prison camps were dissolved (in 1948), most of the remaining German population left Yugoslavia in subsequent decades, mainly because of economic reasons. After World War II, the village was settled by (mainly ethnic Serb) migrants from Bosnia and Herzegovina. Post-WW2 population censuses recorded Serb ethnic majority in the village.

== Historical population ==
- 1930: 2,421
- 1961: 2,864
- 1971: 2,289
- 1981: 1,993
- 1991: 1,823
- 2002: 1,620
- 2011: 1,291
- 2022: 917

== See also ==
- List of places in Serbia
- List of cities, towns and villages in Vojvodina
