= Temesvár District =

Administrative district of Voivodeship of Serbia and Banat of Temeschwar

Coordinates: 45.7567°N 21.2285°E

Temesvár District Temesvárer District, Kreis Temesvár (German)
- district of the Voivodeship of Serbia and Banat of Temeschwar
- 1851–1860
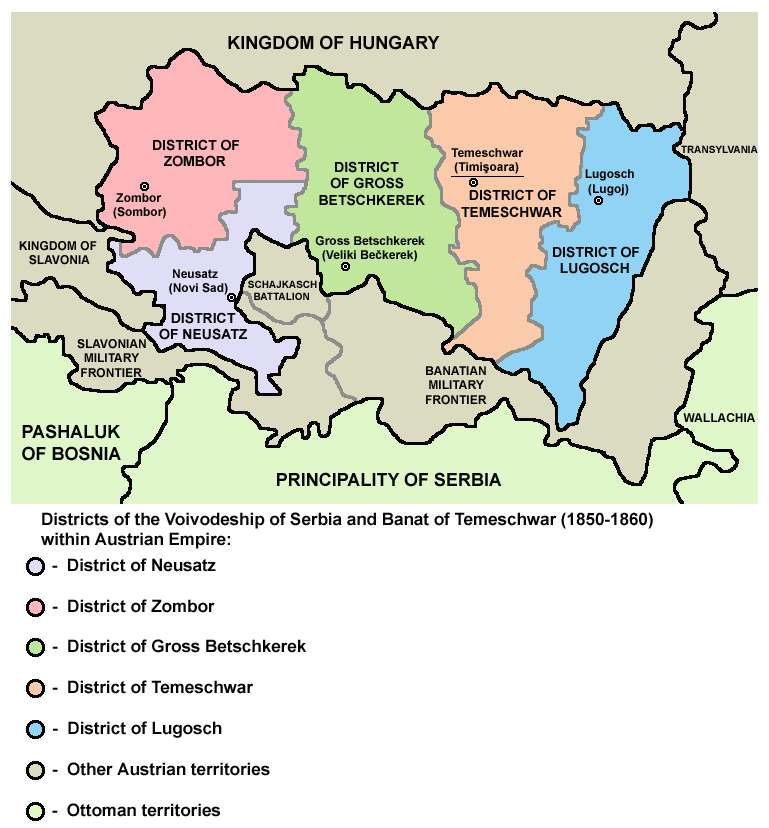
- Districts of the Voivodeship of Serbia and Banat of Temeschwar; Temesvár District is shown in orange
- Capital: Temesvár (Romanian: Timișoara)
- History
  - Established: 1851
  - Disestablished: 1860
Preceded by	Succeeded by
Temeschwar-Karasch District	Temes County
- Today part of: Romania, Serbia

Temesvár District (contemporary German: District von Temesvár or Temesvárer District; Kreis Temesvár or Temesvárer Kreis from 1854) was one of five administrative districts of the Voivodeship of Serbia and Banat of Temeschwar (a crown land within the Austrian Empire), existing from 1851 to 1860. The original German term was Districte, (modern spelling Distrikte), and was changed to Kreise, lit. 'circles', in 1854 . Its administrative centre was Temesvár (Romanian: Timișoara, German: Temeswar or Temeschwar), which was also the capital of the crown land. Following the 1854 reform, Temesvár itself was directly subject to the crown land, and so separate from the district, while still acting as its capital.

== History ==
The Voivodeship of Serbia and Banat of Temeschwar crown land was formed in 1849. In 1851, it was divided into five districts: Lugos, Temesvár, Groß-Becskerek, Zombor, and Neusatz. Temesvár District was based on the former territory of the Hungarian Temes County.

In German, the original term used for these subdivisions was Districte (modern spelling Distrikte). In 1851 they were divided into subdivisions called (politische) Bezirke, usually translated as '(political) districts'.

In Bach's reforms from 1853 (formally applied to the crown land in 1854) the Districte became Kreise, a form of administrative division already in use across much of the non-Hungarian part of the Empire since the 18th century. The term Kreis, literally 'circle', is also often translated as 'district'. The subdivisions of the Kreise were also called Bezirke in German, or Amtsbezirke ('office districts', in reference to the Bezirksämter or 'district offices' which ran them) to distinguish them from other types of Bezirk. The change of name was not superficial – different political, administrative, and judicial structures were used in each subdivision type. (See also Districts of Austria § Habsburg Monarchy and Austrian Empire.)

In 1860, the crown land and its five districts were abolished; the territory of the Temesvár District reverted to Temes County under Hungary.

== Geography ==
The Temesvár District comprised the central parts of Banat. It shared borders with the Groß-Becskerek District to the west, Lugos District to the east, the Banat Military Frontier in the south, and the Hungarian Arad County in the north (all parts of the Austrian Empire). Until 1849, it had been the Hungarian Temes County.

== Subdivisions ==
In 1851, Temesvár District was subdivided into 5 political districts (politische Bezirke), which were structurally akin to the modern districts of Austria (names as defined):

- Neu-Arad (now part of Arad)
- Lippa
- Temesvár
- Csakova
- Werschetz

The city of Temesvár (Temeswar, Timișoara) was separate from the political districts; the Temesvár district covered the area around the city, which acted as its seat/capital (i.e. it was a statutory city).

In 1854 Temesvár District (now a Kreis), was subdivided into 6 'office districts' (Amtsbezirke) (names as defined):

1. Temesvár (environs)
2. Neu-Arad (now part of Arad)
3. Lippa
4. Csakova
5. Werschetz
6. Buziasch

The city of Temesvár (Temeswar, Timișoara), as the capital of the crown land, was a statutory city directly subordinate to the Statthalterei (roughly governorate) and not part of the district. It did however act as its seat and administrative centre.
