= Srpski Krstur =

Srpski Krstur Српски Крстур (Serbian)
- Village (Selo)
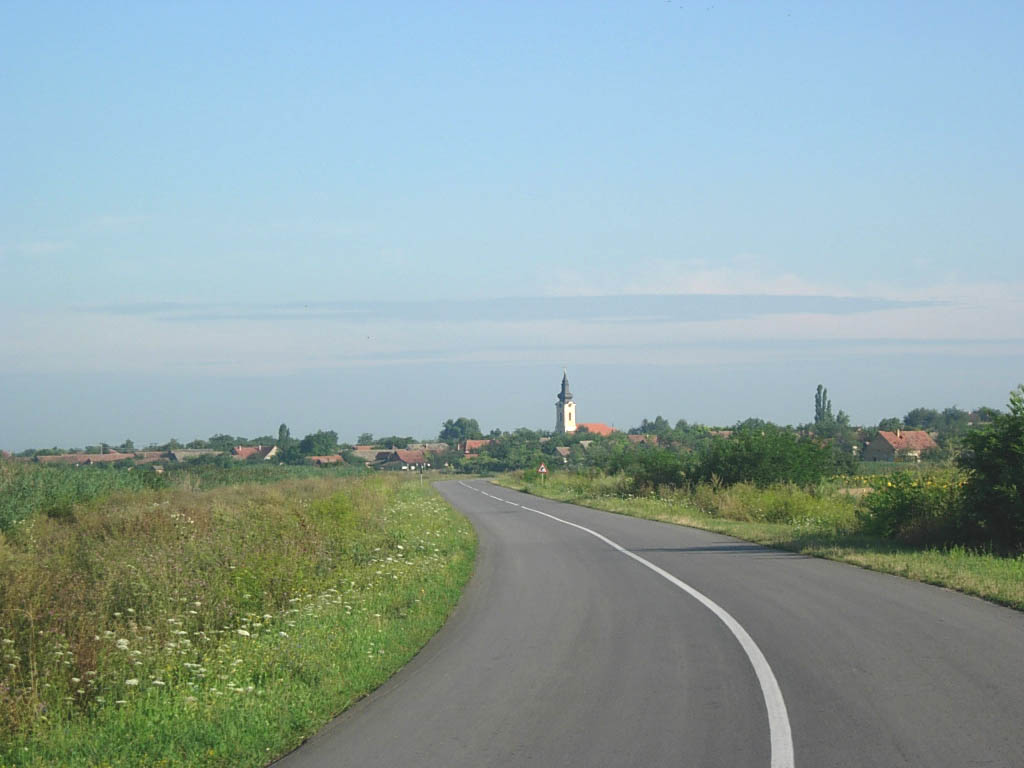
- The village of Srpski Krstur

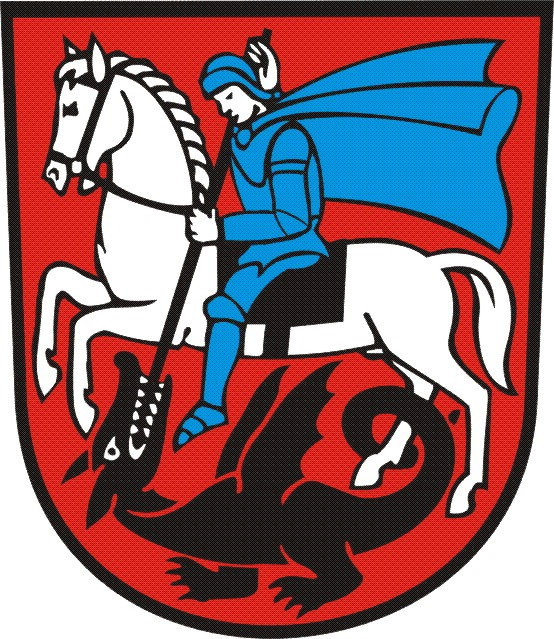
- Coat of arms

- Location of Vojvoda Zimonić within Serbia Srpski Krstur (Serbia) Srpski Krstur (Europe)
- Coordinates: 46°07′10″N 20°06′12″E
- Country: Serbia
- Province: Vojvodina
- District: North Banat
- Municipalities: Novi Kneževac
- Elevation: 75 m (246 ft)

Population (2002)
  - Srpski Krstur: 1,620
- Time zone: UTC+1 (CET)
  - Summer (DST): UTC+2 (CEST)
- Postal code: 23334
- Area code: +381(0)230
- Car plates: KI

Srpski Krstur (Serbian Cyrillic: Српски Крстур) is a village located in Serbia, in the Novi Kneževac municipality of the North Banat District, in the Autonomous Province of Vojvodina. The village has a Serb ethnic majority (69.81%) with a present Romani (13.58%) and Hungarian minority (9.38%). It has a population of 1,620 people (2002 census).

== Name ==
In Serbian, the village is known as Српски Крстур / Srpski Krstur (also simply Крстур / Krstur), in Croatian as Srpski Krstur, and in Hungarian as Ókeresztúr.

Its name means "the Serb Krstur" (There is also a village of Ruski Krstur in Vojvodina, meaning "the Rusyn Krstur"). The Serbian name of the village derived from Serbian word krst ("cross" in English), while Hungarian name derived from Hungarian word kereszt (meaning "cross" in English too). The Hungarian word kereszt itself is of Slavic origin - variants of this word in some other Slavic languages are including Bulgarian "Кръст" ("krst"), Russian "Крест" ("krest"), Ukrainian "Хрест" ("hrest"), etc.

== History ==
Bronze Age graves of south Russian steppe nomads were found in nearby Đala.

The village was mentioned first in 1390. According to some claims, it was mentioned in the 15th century under name Papkeresztúr. In the 14th-15th century, the village was part of the Csanadiensis County within the medieval Kingdom of Hungary.

In 1526-1527 it was part of the Serb state of Emperor Jovan Nenad, and was subsequently included into the Ottoman Empire. During the Ottoman administration, the village was part of the Temeşvar Eyalet. In the middle of the 17th century, the village was uninhabited.

It was repopulated in the 18th century, during the Habsburg administration. In 1717, population of the village numbered 4 houses. In 1752, the village was populated by Serbs, who came from the abolished parts of the Military Frontier in Pomorišje and the population of the village increased; in 1787 its population numbered 719, and in 1850 1,793 inhabitants.

From 1718 to 1778, the village was part of a separate Habsburg province known as the Banat of Temeswar. After abolishment of this province, in 1778, the village was included into Torontal County, which was administratively a part of the Habsburg Kingdom of Hungary. The village was also a part of the autonomous District of Velika Kikinda within the Torontal County from 1774 to 1876. In 1848–1849, the village was part of autonomous Serbian Vojvodina and in 1849-1860 part of the Voivodeship of Serbia and Banat of Temeschwar, a separate Habsburg crown land. It was part of the Batschka-Torontal District (1849-1850) and Großbetschkerek District (1850-1860) within the voivodeship. After the abolishment of the voivodeship in 1860, the village was again included into Torontal County. In 1910 census, majority of village inhabitants spoke the Serbian language.

In 1918, the village firstly became part of the Banat Republic, then (as part of the Banat, Bačka and Baranja region) part of the Kingdom of Serbia, and finally part of the Kingdom of Serbs, Croats and Slovenes (later renamed to Yugoslavia). In 1918–1919, the village was part of the Banat, Bačka and Baranja region and also (from 1918 to 1922) part of the Veliki Bečkerek district. From 1922 to 1929, the village was part of the Belgrade Oblast and from 1929 to 1941 part of the Danube Banovina. From 1941 to 1944, the village was part of German-occupied Serbia and was included into the autonomous region of Banat, which was governed by its German minority.

Since 1944, the village is part of autonomous Yugoslav Vojvodina, which (from 1945) was part of new socialist Serbia within Yugoslavia.

== Historical population ==
- 1961: 2,415
- 1971: 2,201
- 1981: 1,794
- 1991: 1,552

== See also ==
- List of places in Serbia
- List of cities, towns and villages in Vojvodina
