= District of Velika Kikinda =

District of Velika Kikinda Великокикиндски привилеговани диштрикт Velikokikindski privilegovani dištrikt Privilegierten Bezirk Gross Kikinda Regio-privilegiatus Districtus Magnokikindiensis Nagykikindai kerület
- district of the Habsburg monarchy
- 1774–1876
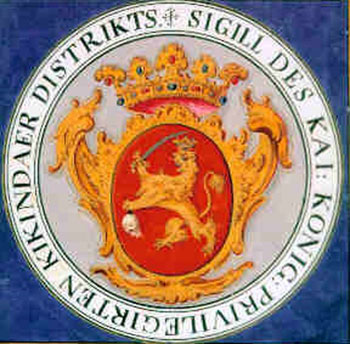
- Coat of arms

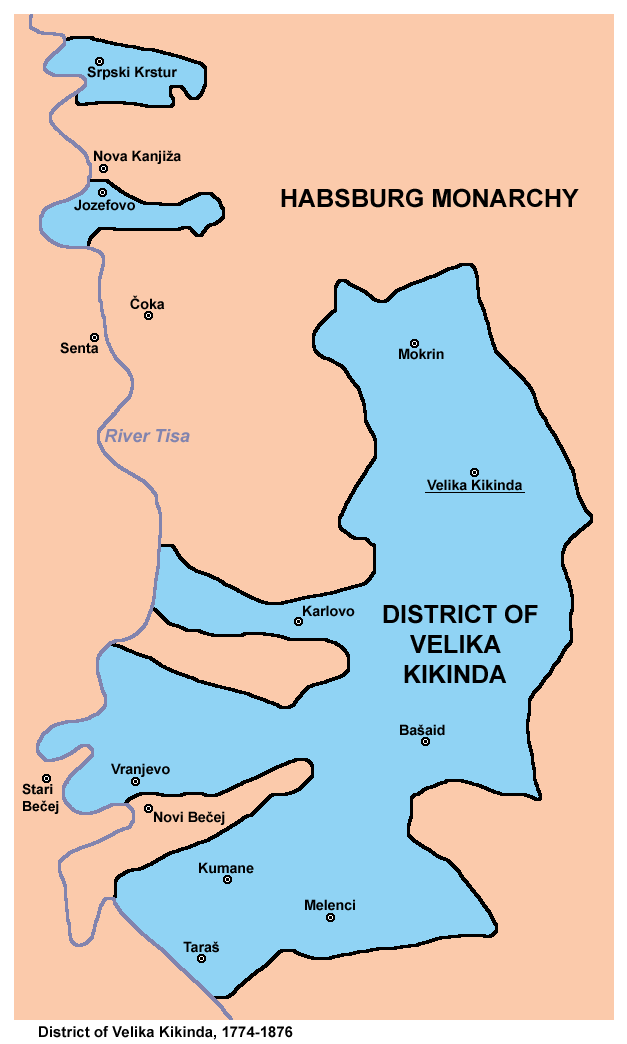
- District of Velika Kikinda (1774-1876)
- Capital: Velika Kikinda (today Kikinda)
- History
  - Established: 1774
  - Disestablished: 1876
Preceded by	Succeeded by
Banat of Temeswar	Torontal County
- Today part of: Serbia

The Privileged District of Velika Kikinda (Serbian: Великокикиндски привилеговани диштрикт / Velikokikindski privilegovani dištrikt; German: Privilegierten Bezirk Gross Kikinda; Latin: Regio-privilegiatus Districtus Magnokikindiensis; Hungarian: Nagykikindai kerület) was an administrative territorial entity of the Habsburg monarchy between 1774 and 1876. It was an autonomous area centered around the town of Velika Kikinda (nowadays Kikinda, Serbia), and mainly inhabited by ethnic Serbs.

== History ==
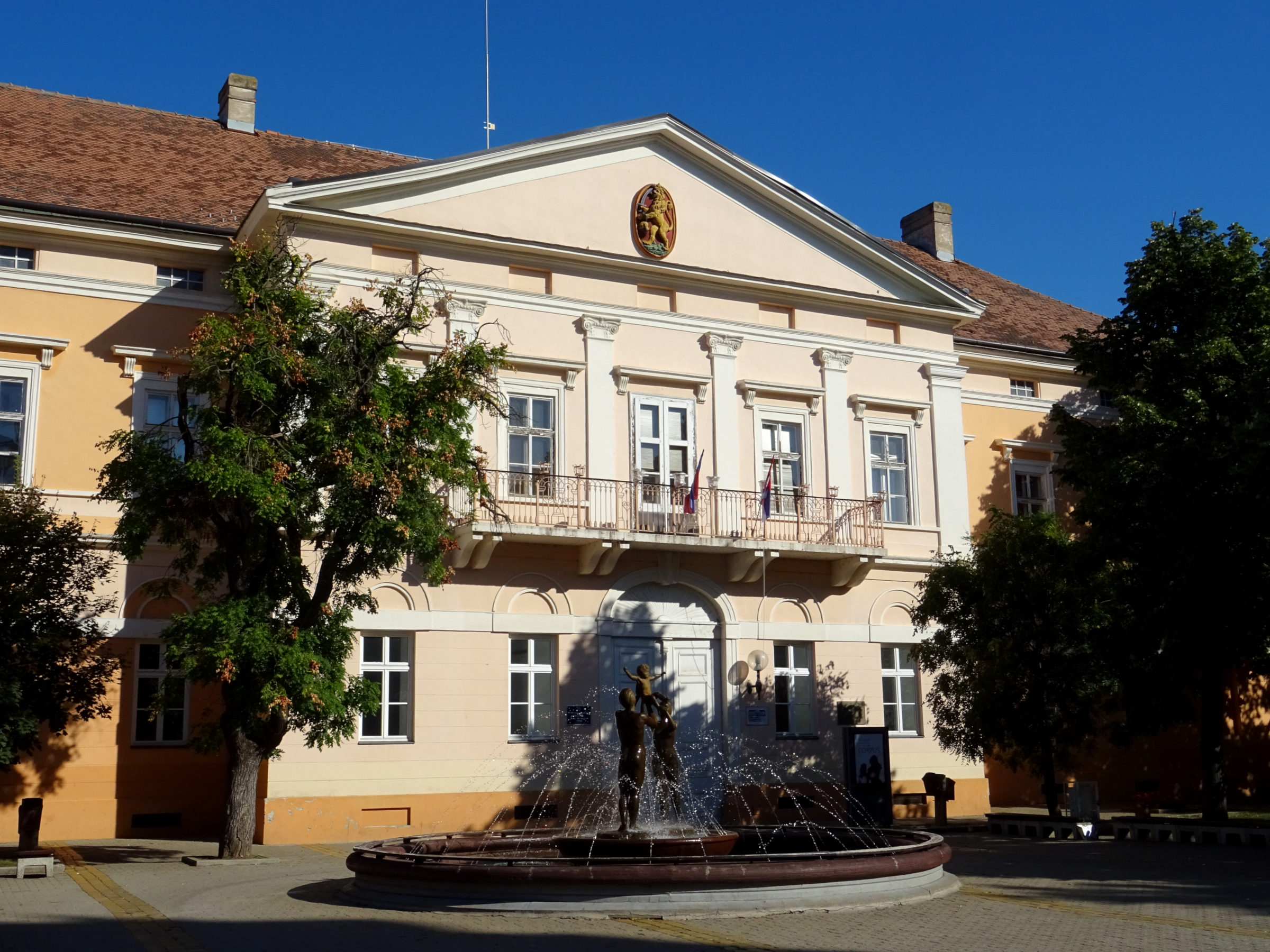
Palace of the District of Velika Kikinda, today housing city museum and archives

It was formed on 12 November 1774 by the decision of Habsburg Empress Maria Theresa, through the special charter, as the specific feudal governmental administrative unit with the headquarters in Velika Kikinda (today Kikinda, Serbia). Inhabitants of the District had, during that period, substantial economic, and even political privileges within the Habsburg monarchy.

Until 1778, the District of Velika Kikinda was part of the Banat of Temeswar (a separate Habsburg entity), and then part of the Torontal County within the Habsburg Kingdom of Hungary. From 1848 to 1849 it was part of the autonomous Serbian Vojvodina, and from 1849 to 1860 it was part of the Voivodeship of Serbia and Banat of Temeschwar, a separate Austrian crown entity. After the abolishment of the Voivodeship in 1860, the territory of the District of Velika Kikinda was again included into the Torontal County.

The District functioned, with some interruptions, until 1876, when it was abolished, and its territory was allocated both organizationally and administratively to the direct authority of the Torontal County with the headquarters in Veliki Bečkerek (today Zrenjanin, Serbia), which covered most of the territory of the present-day Serbian Banat.

== Settlements ==
Beside the town of Velika Kikinda, the district included nine more settlements of the Serb Military Frontier establishments in North and Central Banat:

- Srpski Krstur
- Jozefovo (today part of Novi Kneževac)
- Mokrin
- Karlovo (today part of Novo Miloševo)
- Bašaid
- Vranjevo (today part of Novi Bečej)
- Melenci
- Kumane
- Taraš

== See also ==
- District of Potisje
