= Serbian Voivodeship =

Serbian Voivodeship may refer to:

- Serbian Vojvodina
- Voivodeship of Serbia and Banat of Temeschwar
