= Krstur =

Krstur may refer to the following villages in Vojvodina, Serbia:

- Ruski Krstur, Kula, West Bačka District
- Srpski Krstur, Novi Kneževac, North Banat District
