= Neusatz =

Neusatz may refer to:

- Novi Sad, Serbia
- Neusatz District
