= Cercle (French colonial) =

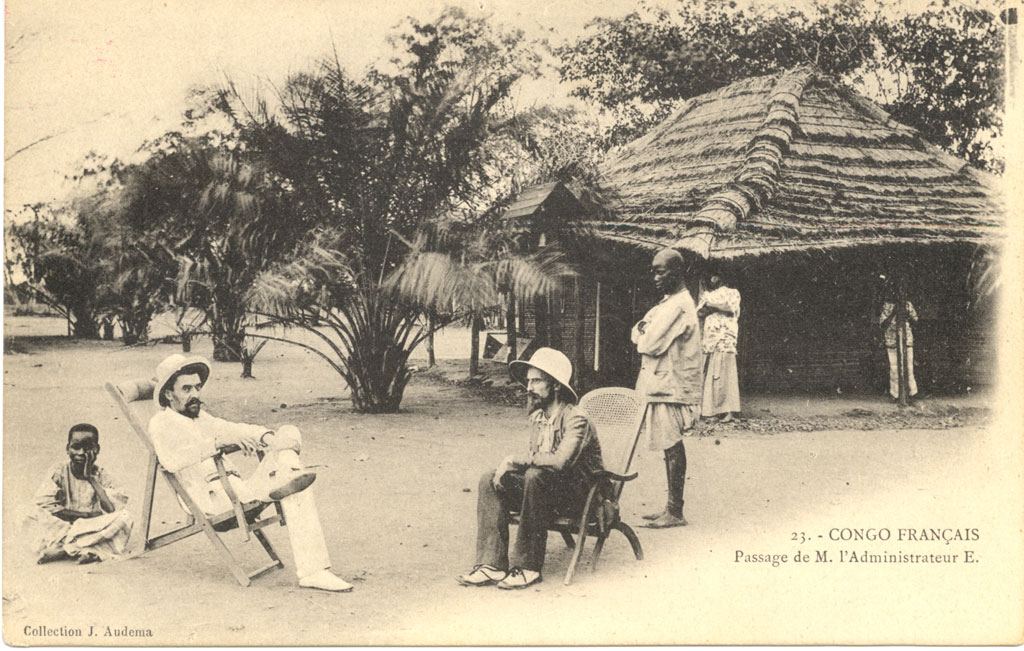
A French colonial administrator makes his "tour" of outposts, c. 1905. Presumably the other European (right) is a French cercle administrator.

A cercle (French pronunciation: [sɛʁ.kl(ə)]) was the smallest unit of French political administration in French colonial Africa that was headed by a European officer. A cercle consisted of several cantons, each of which in turn consisted of several villages, and was instituted in France's African colonies from 1895 to 1946.

At the bottom of the European administration the "cercle commander" ("commandant de cercle") was subject to the authority of a district commander, and the government of the colony above him, but was independent of the military structure (outside of military areas, e.g. modern Niger and Mauritania prior to the Second World War). Below the "cercle commander" was a series of African "chefs de canton" and "chefs du village": "chiefs" appointed by the French and subject to removal by the Europeans. As well, the "cercle commander" made use of a large number of servants, employees, and African officers such as the "gardes-de-cercle" police, any military units seconded to them by government authorities, and sub-administrators such as the precepteur du marché trade inspectors, etc.

== Indigénat legal system ==
Cercle commanders and district commanders were also the chief judges of the Indigénat legal code in the area they commanded. Commanders were expected to make regular tours of their areas to enforce policies, rule on cases, extract taxes and Prestation labor and implement political and economic projects of either the colonial governor, the French Overseas Ministry, or of their own creation.

The commandant de cercle, or any white man in practice, was free to impose summary punishment for any of 34 (later 12) vague headings of infractions of the code: from murder down to 'disrespect' of France, its symbols, or functionaries. These could range from fines, to 15 days in prison, executed immediately. While the statute stated that all punishments must be signed by the colonial governor, this was almost always done after the fact. Corporal punishment was outlawed, but still regularly used. And while reforms were periodically placed upon these powers, in practice they became common and arbitrary. Over 1,500 officially reported infractions were punished under the indigénat in Moyen Congo in 1908–1909 alone.

== Sub-officials ==
In addition, native sub-officials, such as the appointed local chiefs, made use of forced labor, compulsory crops, and taxes in kind at their discretion. As the enforcers of the indigénat, they were also, in part, beneficiaries. Still, they themselves were quite firmly under French authority when the French chose to exercise it. It was only in 1924 that chiefs du canton were exempted from the Indigénat, and if they showed insubordination or disloyalty they could still (as all Africans) be imprisoned for up to ten years for "political offences" by French officials (subject to a signature of the minister of colonies).

Gardes-de-cercle supported the European officer. Gardes-de-cercle were Africans used as auxiliary policemen to support local colonial administrators. Since they were often called upon to arrest people and to compel them to supply forced labor, the French usually recruited them from outside the cercle where they served. As a consequence, they were often disliked and distrusted by the local inhabitants, even though they were Africans.

== Coming of independence ==
The Lamine Guèye law finally enabled some form of small political representation from the colonies after the war. One year later, the courts and labor laws of the Indigénat were removed.

Legally, the Indigénat and the power of cercle commanders was dismantled in three steps. The ordinance of 7 May 1944 suppressed the summary punishment statutes, and offered citizenship to those who met certain criteria and would give up their rights to native or Muslim courts. This citizenship was given on a personal basis: their (even future) children would still fall under the Indigénat. The Lamine Guèye law of 7 April 1946 formally extended citizenship across the empire, indigènes included. Third, the law of 20 September 1947 removed the two tier court system and mandated equal access to public employment.

Reduced to a political subdivision roughly equivalent to a French department and stripped of the personal power of the cercle commander system, the cercle name retained enough imperial connotations to be changed by most nations upon independence to departments or sub-prefectures. Mali is the only nation in sub-Saharan Africa to retain the name cercle for its second level sub-divisions.

== See also ==
- Cercle (Mali)
- Circle (administrative division)
