= Batschka-Torontal District =

Batschka-Torontal District: Bezirk Batschka-Torontal (German); Бачко-торонталски округ/Bačko-torontalski okrug (Serbian); Bács-Torontáli körzet (Hungarian); Districtul Bacica-Torontal (Romanian)
- district of the Voivodeship of Serbia and Banat of Temeschwar
- 1849–1850
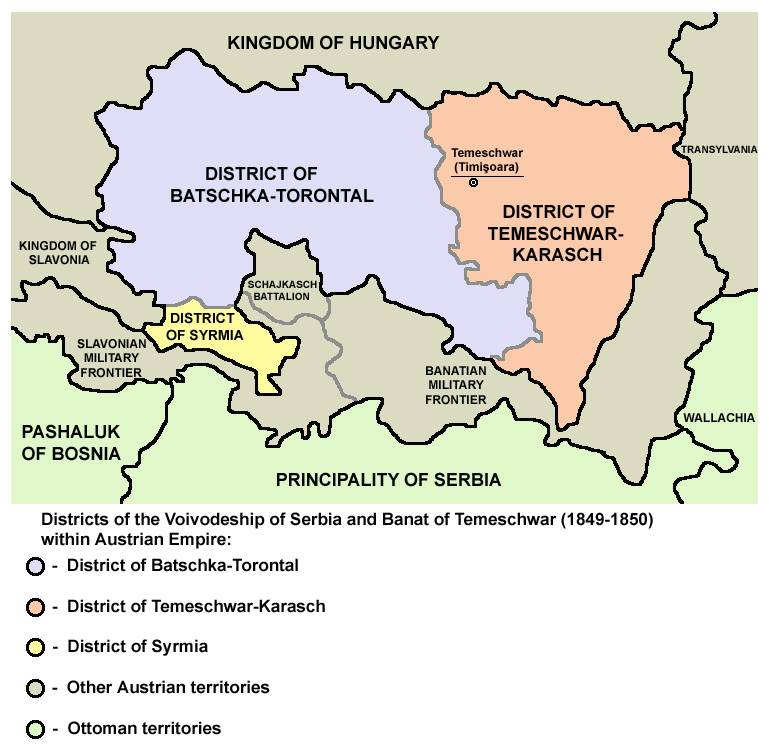
- Capital: not specified
- History
  - Established: 1849
  - Disestablished: 1850
Preceded by
Batsch-Bodrog County
Torontal County
Syrmia County
Succeeded by
Neusatz District
Zombor District
Großbetschkerek District
- Today part of: Serbia, Romania, Hungary, Croatia

Batschka-Torontal District (Serbian: Bačko-torontalski okrug or Бачко-торонталски округ; German: Bezirk Batschka-Torontal; Hungarian: Bács-Torontáli körzet; Romanian: Districtul Bacica-Torontal; Croatian: Bačko-torontalski okrug) was one of two original administrative districts of the Voivodeship of Serbia and Banat of Temeschwar (a crown land within Austrian Empire). It existed from 1849 to 1850.

== History ==
The crown land Voivodeship of Serbia and Banat of Temeschwar was formed in 1849 and was initially divided into two districts: Batschka-Torontal and Temeschwar-Karasch.

In 1850, crown land was divided into five districts and the territory of Batschka-Torontal District was divided among Neusatz District, Zombor District and Großbetschkerek District.

== Geography ==
The Batschka-Torontal District included most of Bačka (excluding Šajkaška region), north-western Banat and northern Syrmia. It shared borders with Temeschwar-Karasch District in the east, the Banat Military Frontier in the south, Kingdom of Slavonia (Osijek/Essek County) in the southwest, and the Kingdom of Hungary in the north and west (all parts of the Austrian Empire).

== Demographics ==
According to 1850 census, the population of the district numbered 1,002,013 residents, including:

- Germans = 276,552 (27.6%)
- Serbs = 264,547 (26.4%)
- Hungarians = 251,247 (25.07%)

== Cities and towns ==
Main cities and towns in the district were:

- Abthausen (Apatin)
- Alt Betsche (Stari Bečej)
- Frankenstadt (Baja)
- Futok (Futog)
- Großbetschkerek (Veliki Bečkerek)
- Großkikinda (Velika Kikinda)
- India (Inđija)
- Josephsfeld (Kula)
- Maria-Theresiopel (Subotica)
- Neusatz (Novi Sad)
- Plankenburg (Palanka)
- Ruma (Ruma)
- Temeri (Temerin)
- Zenta (Senta)
- Zombor (Sombor)

Most of the mentioned cities and towns are today in Serbia, while town of Frankenstadt (Baja) is today in Hungary.

== See also ==
- Bačka
- Torontal
- Voivodeship of Serbia and Banat of Temeschwar
