= Zombor District =

Administrative district of Voivodeship of Serbia and Banat of Temeschwar

Coordinates: 45.774167°N 19.112222°E

Zombor District Zambórer Distrikt, Kreis Zombor (German) Сомборски округ (Serbian) Somborski okrug (Serbian) Zombori körzet (Hungarian)
- District of the Voivodeship of Serbia and Temes Banat
- 1850–1860
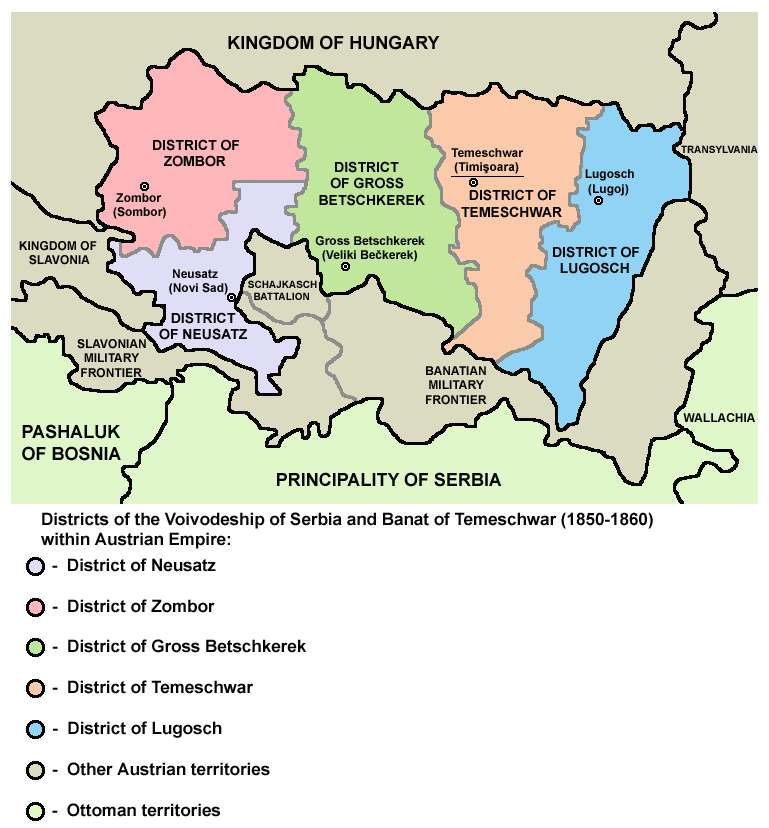
- Districts of the Voivodeship of Serbia and Banat of Temeschwar; Zombor District is shown in red
- Capital: Zombor (Serbian: Sombor)
- History
  - Established: 1850
  - Disestablished: 1860
Preceded by	Succeeded by
Batschka-Torontal District	Batsch-Bodrog County
- Today part of: Serbia, Hungary

Zombor District (Serbian: Сомборски округ, Somborski okrug; German: Zambórer Distrikt, Kreis Zombor from 1853; Hungarian: Zombori körzet; Bunjevac: Somborski okrug) was one of five administrative districts (originally Districte, modern spelling Distrikte; Kreise, lit. 'circles', from 1853) of the Voivodeship of Serbia and Temes Banat (a crown land within Austrian Empire) from 1850 to 1860. Its administrative center was Zombor (Serbian: Sombor).

== History ==
The crown land Voivodeship of Serbia and Temes Banat was formed in 1849 and was initially divided into two districts: Batschka-Torontal and Temeschwar-Karasch. In 1850, crown land was divided into five districts and the territory of Batschka-Torontal District was divided among Neusatz District, Zombor District and Großbetschkerek District.

In German the original term used for these subdivisions was Districte (modern spelling Distrikte). In 1851 they were divided into subdivisions called (politische) Bezirke, usually translated as '(political) districts'.

In Bach's reforms from 1853 the Districte became Kreise, a form of administrative division already in use across much of the non-Hungarian part of the Empire since the 18th century. The term Kreis, literally 'circle', is also often translated as 'district'. The subdivisions of the Kreise were also called Bezirke in German, or Amtsbezirke ('office districts', in reference to the Bezirksämter or 'district offices' which ran them) to distinguish them from other types of Bezirk. The change of name was not superficial – different political, administrative and judicial structures were used in each subdivision type. (See also Districts of Austria § Habsburg Monarchy and Austrian Empire.)

In 1860, the Voivodeship of Serbia and Temes Banat and its five districts were abolished and the territory of the Zombor District was administratively included into the Batsch-Bodrog County (part of the Austrian Kingdom of Hungary).

== Geography ==
The Zombor District included northern parts of Bačka. It shared borders with the Neusatz District in the south, Großbetschkerek District in the east, Austrian Kingdom of Slavonia in the south-west, and Austrian Kingdom of Hungary in the north-west.

== Demographics ==
According to 1850 census, the population of the Zombor district numbered 376,366 residents, including:

- Hungarians = 160,016 (42.52%)
- Germans = 103,886 (27.6%)
- Bunjevci = 53,908 (14.32%)
- Serbs = 40,054 (10.64%)
- Jews = 7,830 (2.08%)

== Subdivisions ==
In 1851 Zombor District was subdivided into 4 political districts (politische Bezirke), which were structurally akin to the modern districts of Austria:

- Zombór
- Baja
- Theresiopel
- Kula

The cities of Zombór (Sombor) and Theresiopel (Subotica) were separate from the political districts; the districts which carried their names covered the areas around the cities, which acted as their seats/capitals (i.e. they were statutory cities).

In 1854 Zombor District (now a Kreis) was subdivided into 6 'office districts' (Amtsbezirke):

1. Zombor
2. Apathin
3. Kula
4. Baja
5. Maria-Theresiopel
6. Zenta

== Cities and towns ==
Main cities and towns in the district were:

- Abthausen (Apatin)
- Ada an der Theiß (Ada)
- Almasch (Almás)
- Alt-Kanischa (Stara Kanjiža)
- Batschka Topola (Bačka Topola)
- Frankenstadt (Baja)
- Jankovatz (Jankovácz)
- Josephsfeld (Kula)
- Maria-Theresiopel (Subotica)
- Zenta (Senta)
- Zombor (Sombor)

Most of the mentioned cities and towns are today in Serbia, while towns of Frankenstadt (Baja), Almasch (Almás) and Jankovatz (Jankovácz) are today in Hungary.

== See also ==
- Sombor
- Voivodeship of Serbia and Temes Banat
