= Großbetschkerek District =

Administrative district of Voivodeship of Serbia and Banat of Temeschwar

Großbetschkerek District Großbetschkekerer Distrikt, Kreis Großbetschkerek (German) Округ Велики Бечкерек (Serbian) Okrug Veliki Bečkerek (Serbian) Nagybecskereki körzet (Hungarian) Districtul Becicherecul Mare (Romanian)
- district of the Voivodeship of Serbia and Banat of Temeschwar
- 1850–1860
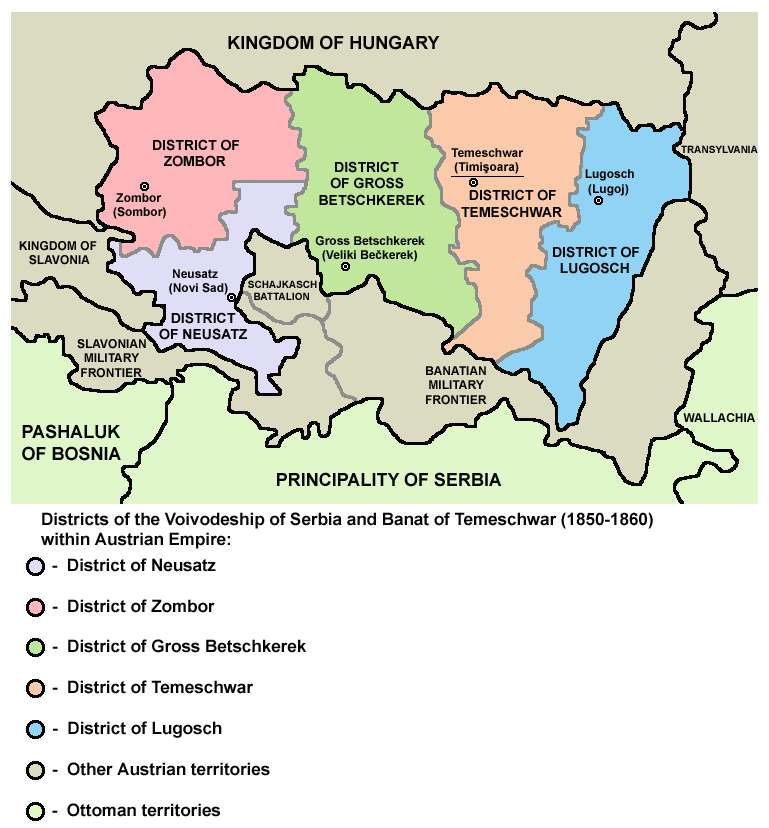
- Districts of the Voivodeship of Serbia and Banat of Temeschwar; Großbetschkerek District is shown in green
- Capital: Großbetschkerek (Serbian: Veliki Bečkerek)
- History
  - Established: 1850
  - Disestablished: 1860
Preceded by	Succeeded by
Batschka-Torontal District	Torontal County
- Today part of: Serbia, Romania, Hungary

Großbetschkerek District (Serbian: Okrug Veliki Bečkerek or Округ Велики Бечкерек; German: Großbetschkekerer Distrikt, Kreis Großbetschkerek from 1853 (contemporary Groß-Becskereker District, Kreis Gross-Becskerek); Hungarian: Nagybecskereki körzet; Romanian: Districtul Becicherecul Mare) was one of five administrative districts (originally Districte, modern spelling Distrikte; Kreise, lit. 'circles', from 1853) of the Voivodeship of Serbia and Banat of Temeschwar (a crown land within the Austrian Empire) from 1850 to 1860. Its administrative center was Großbetschkerek (Serbian: Veliki Bečkerek).

== History ==
The crown land Voivodeship of Serbia and Banat of Temeschwar was formed in 1849 and was initially divided into two districts: Batschka-Torontal and Temeschwar-Karasch. In 1850, crown land was divided into five districts and the territory of Batschka-Torontal District was divided among Neusatz District, Zombor District and Großbetschkerek District.

In German the original term used for these subdivisions was Districte (modern spelling Distrikte). In 1851 they were divided into subdivisions called (politische) Bezirke, usually translated as '(political) districts'.

In Bach's reforms from 1853 the Districte became Kreise, a form of administrative division already in use across much of the non-Hungarian part of the Empire since the 18th century. The term Kreis, literally 'circle', is also often translated as 'district'. The subdivisions of the Kreise were also called Bezirke in German, or Amtsbezirke ('office districts', in reference to the Bezirksämter or 'district offices' which ran them) to distinguish them from other types of Bezirk. The change of name was not superficial – different political, administrative and judicial structures were used in each subdivision type. (See also Districts of Austria § Habsburg Monarchy and Austrian Empire.)

In 1860, the Voivodeship of Serbia and Banat of Temeschwar and its five districts were abolished and the territory of the Großbetschkerek District was administratively included into the Torontal County (part of the Austrian Kingdom of Hungary).

== Geography ==
The Großbetschkerek District included north-western parts of Banat. It shared borders with the Zombor District and Neusatz District in the west, Temeschwar District in the east, Austrian Military Frontier in the south-west, and Austrian Kingdom of Hungary in the north.

== Demographics ==
According to 1850 census, the population of the district numbered 388,704 residents, including:

- Germans = 126,730 (32.6%)
- Serbs = 124,111 (31.93%)
- Hungarians = 60,781 (15.64%)
- Romanians = 58,292 (15%)
- Bulgarians = 11,045 (2.84%)
- Croats = 3,752 (0.97%)
- Slovaks = 2,562 (0.66%)
- Jews = 1,421 (0.37%)

== Subdivisions ==
In 1851 Großbetschkerek District was subdivided into 6 political districts (politische Bezirke), which were structurally akin to the modern districts of Austria (names as defined, modern German in parentheses):

- Sankt-Miklos (Groß Sankt Nikolaus)
- Hatzfeld
- Türkisch-Kanisá (Neu-Kanischa)
- Gross-Kikinda (Großkikinda)
- Moros (Modosch)
- Becskerek (Großbetschkerek)

The city of Großbetschkerek (Zrenjanin) was separate from the political districts; the Becskerek district covered the area around the city, which acted as its seat/capital (i.e. it was a statutory city).

In 1854 Großbetschkerek District (now a Kreis) was subdivided into 8 'office districts' (Amtsbezirke) (names as defined, modern German in parentheses):

1. Gross-Becskerek (Großbetschkerek)
2. Türkisch-(Neu-)Becse (Neu-Betsche)
3. Modos (Modosch)
4. Gross-Kikinda (Großkikinda)
5. Türkisch-(Neu-)Kanischa (Neu-Kanischa)
6. Gross-Sankt-Miklos (Groß Sankt Nikolaus)
7. Hatzfeld
8. Billet (Billed)

== Cities and towns ==
Main cities and towns in the district were:

- Groß Sankt Nikolaus (Sânnicolau Mare)
- Großbetschkerek (Veliki Bečkerek)
- Großkikinda (Velika Kikinda)
- Hatzfeld (Jimbolia)
- Modosch (Modoš)
- Neu Betsche (Novi Bečej)
- Neu Kanischa (Turska Kanjiža)
- Pardan (Pardanj)
- Perjamosch (Periam)
- Tschene (Cenei)
- Tschoka (Čoka)
- Zichydorf (Zičidorf)

Most of the mentioned cities and towns are today in Serbia, while towns of Groß Sankt Nikolaus (Sânnicolau Mare), Perjamosch (Periam), Hatzfeld (Jimbolia) and Tschene (Cenei) are today in Romania.

== See also ==
- Zrenjanin
- Voivodeship of Serbia and Banat of Temeschwar
