= Neusatz District =

Defunct district of the Voivodeship of Serbia and Banat of Temeschwar

Neusatz District Neusatzer Distrikt, Kreis Neusatz (German) Новосадски округ (Serbian) Novosadski okrug (Serbian) Újvidéki körzet (Hungarian) Novosadský obvod (Slovak)
- district of the Voivodeship of Serbia and Banat of Temeschwar
- 1850–1860
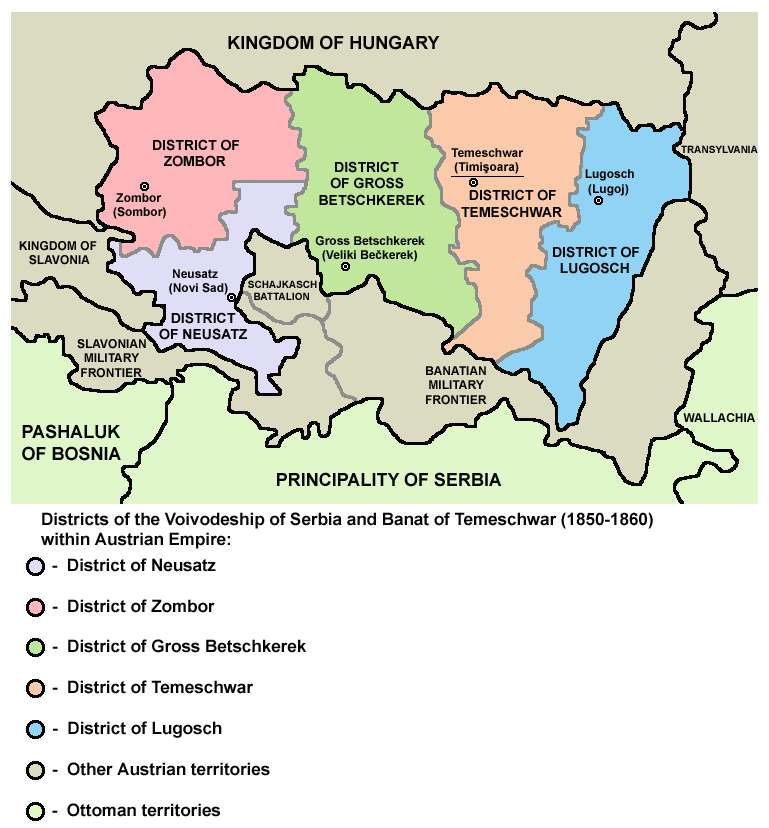
- Districts of the Voivodeship of Serbia and Banat of Temeschwar; Neusatz District is shown in lilac
- Capital: Neusatz (Serbian: Novi Sad)
- History
  - Established: 1850
  - Disestablished: 1860
Preceded by	Succeeded by
Batschka-Torontal District	Batsch-Bodrog County; Syrmia County
- Today part of: Serbia, Croatia

Neusatz District (Serbian: Novosadski okrug or Новосадски округ; German: Neusatzer Distrikt, Kreis Neusatz from 1853; Croatian: Novosadski okrug; Hungarian: Újvidéki körzet; Slovak: Novosadský obvod) was one of five administrative districts (originally Districte, modern spelling Distrikte; Kreise, lit. 'circles', from 1853) of the Voivodeship of Serbia and Banat of Temeschwar (a crown land within Austrian Empire) from 1850 to 1860. Its administrative center was Neusatz (Serbian: Novi Sad).

== History ==
The crown land Voivodeship of Serbia and Banat of Temeschwar was formed in 1849 and was initially divided into two districts: Batschka-Torontal and Temeschwar-Karasch. In 1850, crown land was divided into five districts and the territory of Batschka-Torontal District was divided among Neusatz District, Zombor District and Großbetschkerek District.

In German the original term used for these subdivisions was Districte (modern spelling Distrikte). In 1851 they were divided into subdivisions called (politische) Bezirke, usually translated as '(political) districts'.

In Bach's reforms from 1853 the Districte became Kreise, a form of administrative division already in use across much of the non-Hungarian part of the Empire since the 18th century. The term Kreis, literally 'circle', is also often translated as 'district'. The subdivisions of the Kreise were also called Bezirke in German, or Amtsbezirke ('office districts', in reference to the Bezirksämter or 'district offices' which ran them) to distinguish them from other types of Bezirk. The change of name was not superficial – different political, administrative and judicial structures were used in each subdivision type. (See also Districts of Austria § Habsburg Monarchy and Austrian Empire.)

In 1860, the Voivodeship of Serbia and Banat of Temeschwar and its five districts were abolished and the territory of the Neusatz District was divided among Batsch-Bodrog County (part of the Kingdom of Hungary) and Syrmia County (part of the Austrian Kingdom of Slavonia).

== Geography ==
The Neusatz District included parts of southern Bačka and northern Syrmia. It shared borders with the Zombor District in the north, Großbetschkerek District in the north-east, Military Frontier in the south-east and Austrian Kingdom of Slavonia in the west.

== Demographics ==
According to 1850 census, the population of the district numbered 236,943 residents, including:

- Serbs = 100,382 (42.37%)
- Germans = 45,936 (19.39%)
- Hungarians = 30,450 (12.85%)
- Slovaks = 20,683 (8.73%)
- Šokci = 13,665 (5.77%)
- Jews = 2,098 (0.89%)

== Subdivisions ==
In 1851 Neusatz District was subdivided into 5 political districts (politische Bezirke), which were structurally akin to the modern districts of Austria (names as defined, modern German in parentheses):

- Neusatz
- Palanka
- Becse (Alt Betsche)
- Illok
- Ruma

The city of Neusatz (Novi Sad) was separate from the political districts; the district which carried its name covered the area around the city, which acted as its seat/capital (i.e. it was a statutory city).

In 1854 Neusatz District (now a Kreis) was subdivided into 5 'office districts' (Amtsbezirke) (names as defined, modern German in parentheses):

1. Neusatz
2. Alt-Becse (Alt Betsche)
3. Palanka (Plankenburg)
4. Ruma
5. Illok

== Cities and towns ==
Main cities and towns in the district were:

- Alt Betsche (Stari Bečej)
- Batsch (Bač)
- Futok (Futog)
- Hodschach (Odžaci)
- Illok (Ilok)
- India (Inđija)
- Irick (Irig)
- Neusatz (Novi Sad)
- Plankenburg (Palanka)
- Ruma (Ruma)
- Schid (Šid)
- Temeri (Temerin)
- Thomasberg (Sentomaš)

Most of the mentioned cities and towns are today in Serbia, while town of Illok (Ilok) is today in Croatia.

== See also ==
- History of Novi Sad
- Voivodeship of Serbia and Banat of Temeschwar
