= Syrmia County =

Historic county of the Kingdom of Croatia-Slavonia

Syrmia County Srijemska županija Sremska županija Сремска жупанија Szerém vármegye Komitat Syrmien
- County of the Kingdom of Slavonia, Kingdom of Croatia-Slavonia, Kingdom of Hungary (later Kingdom of Serbs, Croats and Slovenes)
- 1745–1922
- Coat of arms

- Location of Syrmia County (red) within the Kingdom of Croatia-Slavonia (white)
- Capital: Vukovar
- Area
  - Coordinates: 45°21′N 19°0′E
  - 1910: 6,866 km^{2} (2,651 sq mi)
- Population
  - 1910: 414,234
- History
  - Established: 1745
  - territorial reorganization of the SCS Kingdom: 1922
- Today part of: Croatia, Serbia

Syrmia County (Croatian: Srijemska županija, Serbian: Сремска жупанија / Sremska županija, Hungarian: Szerém vármegye, German: Komitat Syrmien) was a historic administrative subdivision (županija) of the Kingdom of Croatia-Slavonia. Croatia-Slavonia was an autonomous kingdom within the Lands of the Crown of Saint Stephen (Transleithania), the Hungarian part of Austria-Hungary. The region of Syrmia is today split between Croatia and Serbia. The capital of the county was Vukovar (Hungarian: Vukovár).

== Geography ==
Syrmia County shared borders with other Croatian-Slavonian counties of Požega and Virovitica, the Austro-Hungarian land of Bosnia and Herzegovina, the Kingdom of Serbia, and the Hungarian counties of Bács-Bodrog and Torontál. The County stretched along the right (southern) bank of the river Danube and the left (northern) bank of the river Sava, down to their confluence. Its area was 6,866 km² around 1910.

== Background ==
By the 13th century, two counties were formed in this region: Syrmia (in the east) and Vukovar (in the west). Syrmia County was an administrative division of the Kingdom of Hungary in the Middle Ages. This area was taken by the Ottoman Empire in 1521 and the two counties were abolished. The territory was then (in 1544) included into Ottoman Sanjak of Syrmia. The Habsburg monarchy took one part of Syrmia from the Ottomans in 1688, while the other part was taken by Habsburgs in 1718. The entire region was incorporated into the Military Frontier, which was then extended from Western Slavonia, where it stood in 1683, all the way to Transylvania.

== History ==
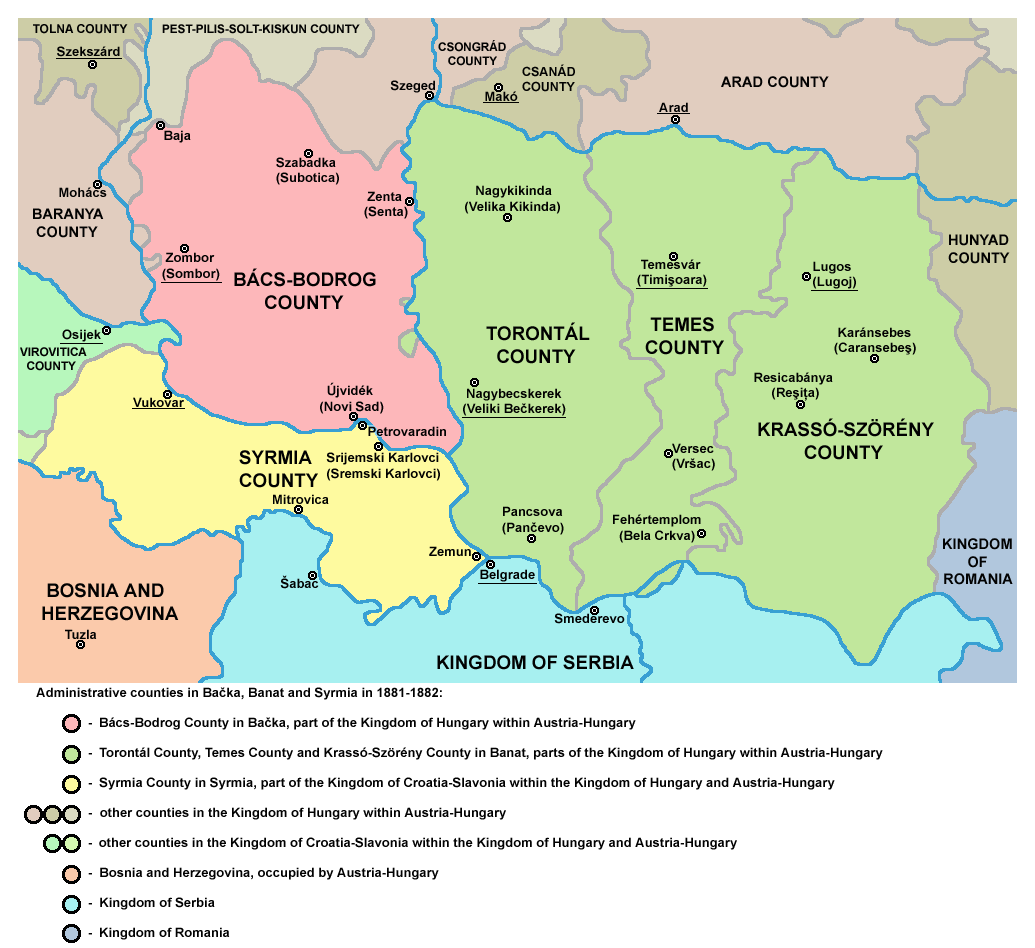
Syrmia county and vicinity (1881–82)

Syrmia County was re-established in 1745 as part of the Kingdom of Slavonia, a Habsburg province, which was part of both the Habsburg Kingdom of Croatia and the Habsburg Kingdom of Hungary. This new county did not cover the whole of its later territory – the southern and furthest eastern parts instead passed to the Slavonian Military Frontier (and partially to the Banat Military Frontier 1849–60). The Kingdom of Slavonia was mainly inhabited by Serbs and Croats.

In 1848 and 1849, the area of the county was part of the Serbian Voivodship, a Serbian autonomous region proclaimed at the May Assembly in Karlovci. Between 1849 and 1860 the eastern part of the county was part of the Voivodeship of Serbia and Banat of Temeschwar, a separate crown land of the Austrian Empire, formally becoming part of the Neusatz District from 1854; the western part around Vukovar passed to the Slavonian Osijek County.

After 1860, Syrmia County was established again, and was reincorporated into the Kingdom of Slavonia, which was a completely separate Habsburg province at the time. In 1867, as a consequence of the Ausgleich between the Austrians and the Hungarians, the Kingdom of Slavonia was incorporated into Transleithania, the half of Austria-Hungary run from Budapest, and in the Hungarian-Croatian Settlement of 1868, it was incorporated into Croatia-Slavonia, a formally separate kingdom within the Kingdom of Hungary, which had a certain level of autonomy and was ruled by its own ban.

In 1881 the Slavonian Military Frontier was abolished; the Petrovaradin district and part of the Brod district would be merged into Syrmia County by 1886.

After World War I, the area of Syrmia County became part of the newly formed Kingdom of Serbs, Croats and Slovenes in 1918 and this was confirmed by the Treaty of Saint-Germain in September 1919. The County of Syrmia was an official administrative division of the Kingdom of Serbs, Croats and Slovenes between 1918 and 1922, and then was transformed into the Province (Oblast) of Syrmia (de facto it was carried out in 1924).

== Demographics ==
- According to the census of 1870, the area of the county under civil administration (so excluding the area of the county under the administration of the slavonian military frontier) had 120,352 inhabitants.
- According to the census of 1890, the county had 347,022 inhabitants.

In 1900, the county had a population of 381,739 people and was composed of the following linguistic communities:

Total:

- Serbian: 168,982 (44.3%)
- Croatian: 100,360 (26.3%)
- German: 67,027 (17.6%)
- Hungarian: 23,539 (6.2%)
- Slovak: 11,415 (3.0%)
- Ruthenian: 4,345 (1.1%)
- Romanian: 601 (0.2%)
- Other or unknown: 5,470 (1.4%)

According to the census of 1900, the county was composed of the following religious communities:

Total:

- Eastern Orthodox: 172,818 (45.3%)
- Roman Catholic: 171,142 (44.8%)
- Lutheran: 22,473 (5.9%)
- Calvinist: 5,750 (1.5%)
- Greek Catholic: 4,681 (1.2%)
- Jewish: 3,894 (1.0%)
- Unitarian: 2 (0.0%)
- Other or unknown: 979 (0.3%)

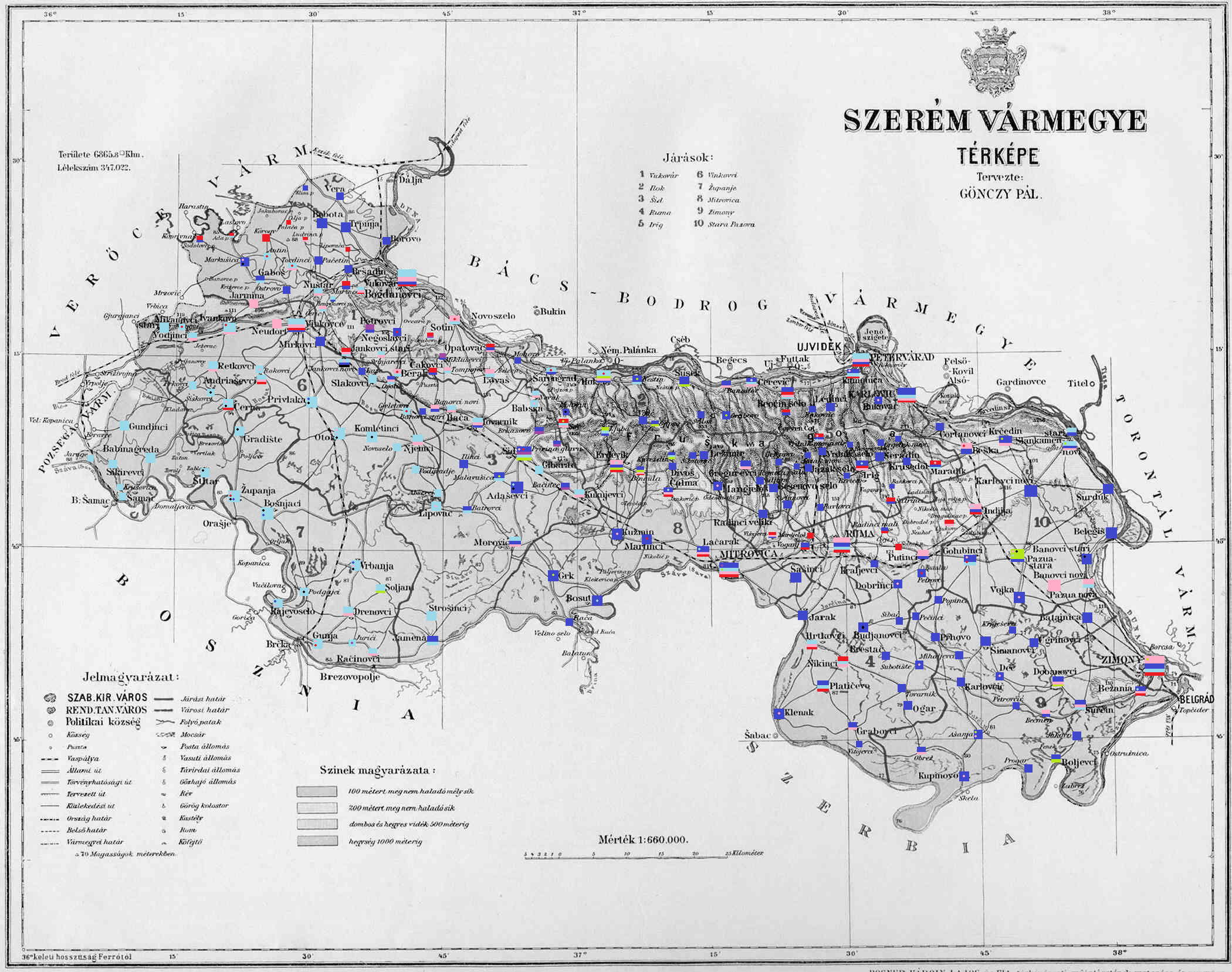
Ethnic map of the county with data of the 1910 census (see the key in the description).

In 1910, the county had a population of 414,234 people and was composed of the following linguistic communities:

Total:

- Serbian: 183,109 (44.2%)
- Croatian: 106,198 (25.6%)
- German: 68,086 (16.4%)
- Hungarian: 29,522 (7.1%)
- Slovak: 13,841 (3.3%)
- Ruthenian: 4,642 (1.1%)
- Romanian: 587 (0.1%)
- Other or unknown: 8,249 (2.0%)

According to the census of 1910, the county was composed of the following religious communities:

Total:

- Eastern Orthodox: 189,007 (45.6%)
- Roman Catholic: 182,140 (44.0%)
- Lutheran: 25,927 (6.3%)
- Calvinist: 7,512 (1.8%)
- Greek Catholic: 5,722 (1.4%)
- Jewish: 3,779 (0.9%)
- Unitarian: 7 (0.0%)
- Other or unknown: 140 (0.0%)

== Subdivisions ==
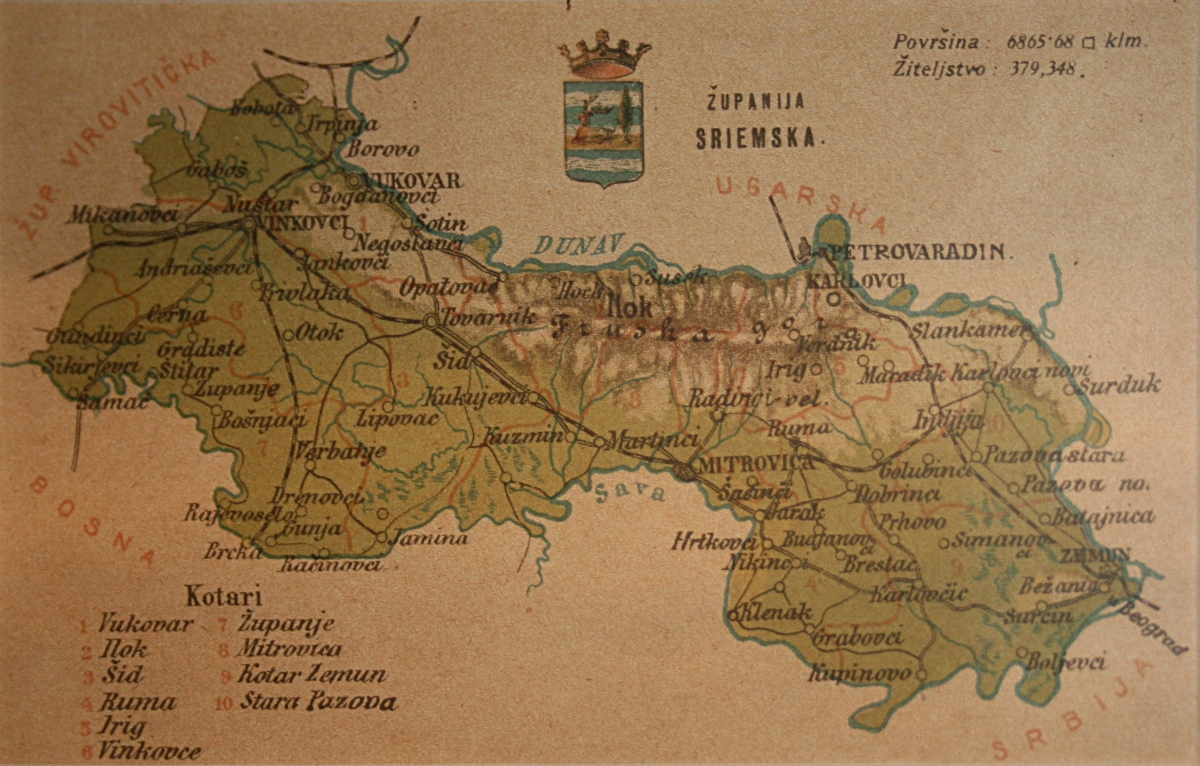
Old detailed map of Syrmia County

In the early 20th century, the subdivisions of Syrmia county were:

Districts
District	Capital
Irig	Irig
Mitrovica	Mitrovica, today Sremska Mitrovica
Ruma	Ruma
Stara Pazova	Stara Pazova
Šid	Šid
Ilok	Ilok
Vinkovci	Vinkovci
Vukovar	Vukovar
Zemun	Zemun
Županja	Županja
Urban counties
Zemun
Urban districts
Sremski Karlovci
Petrovaradin
Mitrovica

The towns of Vukovar, Ilok, Vinkovci, and Županja are currently in Croatia, in Vukovar-Syrmia county. The towns of Šid, Ruma, Irig, Mitrovica (Sremska Mitrovica), Stara Pazova, Sremski Karlovci and Petrovaradin are currently in Serbia. Zemun is currently in Serbian region of Belgrade.

== See also ==
- Palace of Syrmia County
- Kingdom of Slavonia
- Srem District of Serbia
- Vukovar-Syrmia County of Croatia

== Literature ==
- Taube, Friedrich Wilhelm von (1777). Historische und geographische Beschreibung des Königreiches Slavonien und des Herzogthumes Syrmien. Vol. 1. Leipzig.
- Taube, Friedrich Wilhelm von (1777). Historische und geographische Beschreibung des Königreiches Slavonien und des Herzogthumes Syrmien. Vol. 2. Leipzig.
- Taube, Friedrich Wilhelm von (1778). Historische und geographische Beschreibung des Königreiches Slavonien und des Herzogthumes Syrmien. Vol. 3. Leipzig.
