= Voivodeship of Serbia and Banat of Temeschwar =

Crownland of the Austrian Empire between 1849 and 1860

Voivodeship of Serbia and Temes Banate Woiwodschaft Serbien und Temeser Banat Serbian: Војводство Србија и Тамишки Банат
- Crownland of the Austrian Empire
- 1849–1861
- Flag Coat of arms

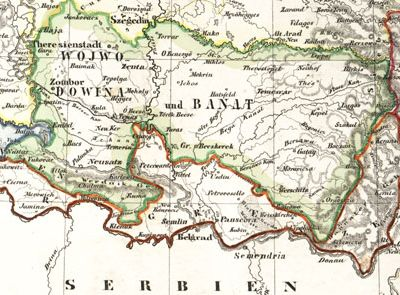
- Capital: Temeschwar
- Government
  - Type: Voivodeship
- History
  - Established: 18 November 1849
  - Disestablished: 27 December 1861
Preceded by	Succeeded by
Serbian Vojvodina; Kingdom of Hungary (1526–1867)	Austrian Empire
- Today part of: Serbia; Romania; Hungary; Croatia

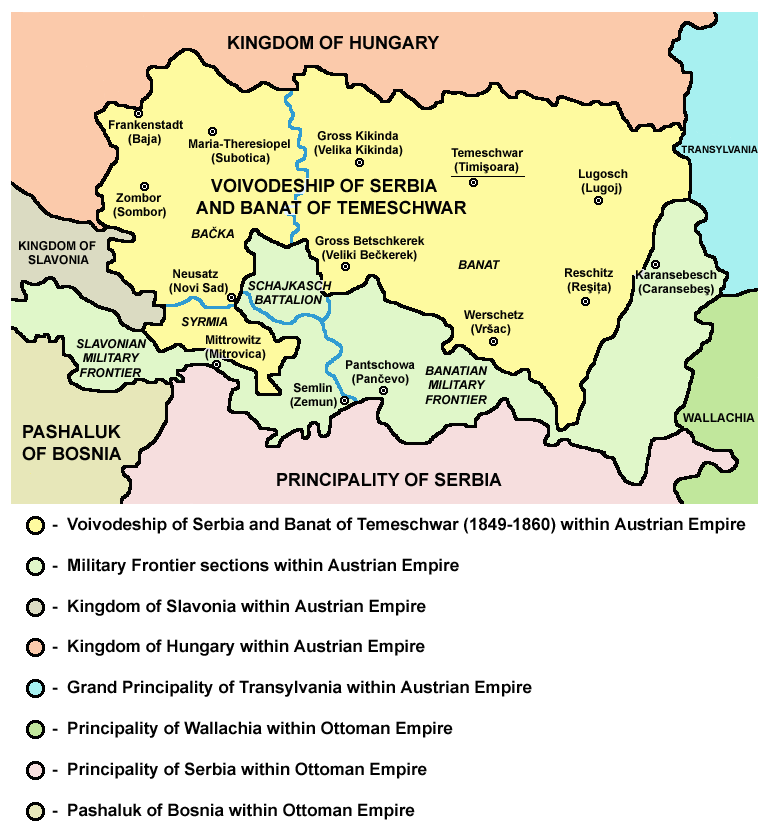
Map of the Voivodeship

The Voivodeship of Serbia and Banat of Temeschwar, or Voivodeship of Serbia and Temes Banat (German: Woiwodschaft Serbien und Temeser Banat, Serbian: Војводство Србија и Тамишки Банат, Romanian: Voivodina sârbească și Banatul timișan, Hungarian: Szerb Vajdaság és Temesi Bánság), was a crownland of the Austrian Empire that existed between 1849 and 1861, centered in Temeschwar. It was created by reorganization of administrative structures in regions of Serbian Vojvodina and Banat of Temeschwar. Its former area is now divided between Serbia, Romania and Hungary. In 1860-1861, it was reincorporated into the Kingdom of Hungary. The Voivodeship gave its name to the present Serbian Vojvodina.

== Names ==
In contemporary German, the crown land was officially known as Woiwodschaft Serbien und Temeser Banat ('Voivodeship of Serbia and Temes Banat'; die Woiwodschaft Serbien und das Temeser Banat when definite). The forms die serbische Wojwodschaft und das Temeser Banat ('the Serbian Voivodeship and the Temes Banat') and die serbische Wojwodschaft mit dem Temeser Banate ('the Serbian Voivodeship with the Temes Banat'; the -e on Banat is a now mostly obsolete dative ending) also appeared frequently in official documents. Other variations also appear as a result of grammatical inflection (see German grammar), such as der serbischen Wojwodschaft und des Temeser Banates (genitive case), but these should not be considered distinct. The spellings Woiwodschaft and Wojwodschaft are typographic variations; Woiwodschaft was used officially until 1852, Wojwodschaft from 1853.

In contemporary Serbian it was known as Vojvodina Srbska i Tamiški Banat (Войводина Србска и Тамишки Банат) and Vojvodstvo Srbija i Tamiški Banat (Војводство Србија и Тамишки Банат). In Hungarian it was known as Szerb Vajdaság és Temesi Bánság, and in Romanian as Voivodina Sârbească și Banatul Timișan.

As in German, in Serbian sources there are two somewhat different variants of the name of the voivodeship; one could be translated into English as Voivodeship of Serbia and Temes Banat and another as Serbian Voivodeship and Temes Banat.

Also in modern English use, the term Temes Banat or Banat of Temes is sometimes incorrectly replaced with term Banat of Temeschwar or Temeschwar Banat. In the original name in all native languages, there is no mention of the city of Temeschwar (Timișoara) in the title of Voivodeship. As shown above, the reference to the Temes region is always used, and should be translated into English as Temes Banat or Banat of Temes.

== History ==
The Serbs had previously been granted a number of privileges by the Habsburg emperor, starting in 1691, followed by the 1779 Declaratory Rescript of the Illyrian Nation. During the Revolutions of 1848 in the Austrian Empire, a self-proclaimed autonomous province of Serbian Vojvodina was created in 1848.

In 1849, the Imperial Patent of 4th March, known as the March Constitution, imposed constitutional reorganization of the Austrian Empire, and provided (in article 72) a formal base for the creation of an official administrative unit under the name: Voivodeship of Serbia (German: Woiwodschaft Serbien), also allowing the possibility for future association of that province with other crown lands.

The Voivodeship was officially formed by a decision of the Austrian emperor in November 1849.

It consisted of the regions of Banat, Bačka and northern Syrmian municipalities of Ilok and Ruma. An Austrian governor seated in Temeschwar ruled the area, and the title of Voivode belonged to the emperor himself. The full title of the emperor was "Grand Voivod of the Voivodeship of Serbia" (German: Großwoiwode der Woiwodschaft Serbien). Even after the Voivodeship was abolished, the emperor kept this title until the end of Austro-Hungarian Monarchy in 1918.

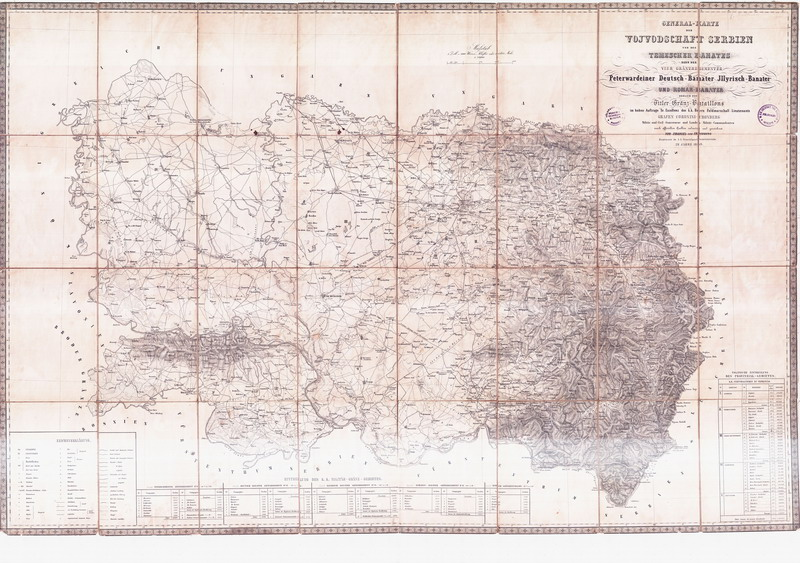
Map from 1853

In 1860, the Voivodeship of Serbia and Temes Banat was abolished and most of its territory (Banat and Bačka) was incorporated into the Habsburg Kingdom of Hungary, although direct Hungarian rule began only in 1867, after the Austro-Hungarian Compromise.

Unlike Banat and Bačka, Syrmia was incorporated into the Kingdom of Slavonia in 1860, another separate Habsburg crown land. The Kingdom of Slavonia subsequently merged with the Kingdom of Croatia, forming the new Kingdom of Croatia-Slavonia, which concluded an agreement with the Kingdom of Hungary in 1868, becoming an autonomous region of the Kingdom of Hungary within Austria-Hungary.

== Languages ==
The two official languages of the Voivodeship were German and "Illyrian" (what would come to be known as Serbian).

== Demographics ==
The Voivodeship was ethnically very mixed, since the southern parts of Syrmia, Banat and Bačka with compact Serbian settlements were not included in it, while eastern Banat, with a Romanian majority was added to it.

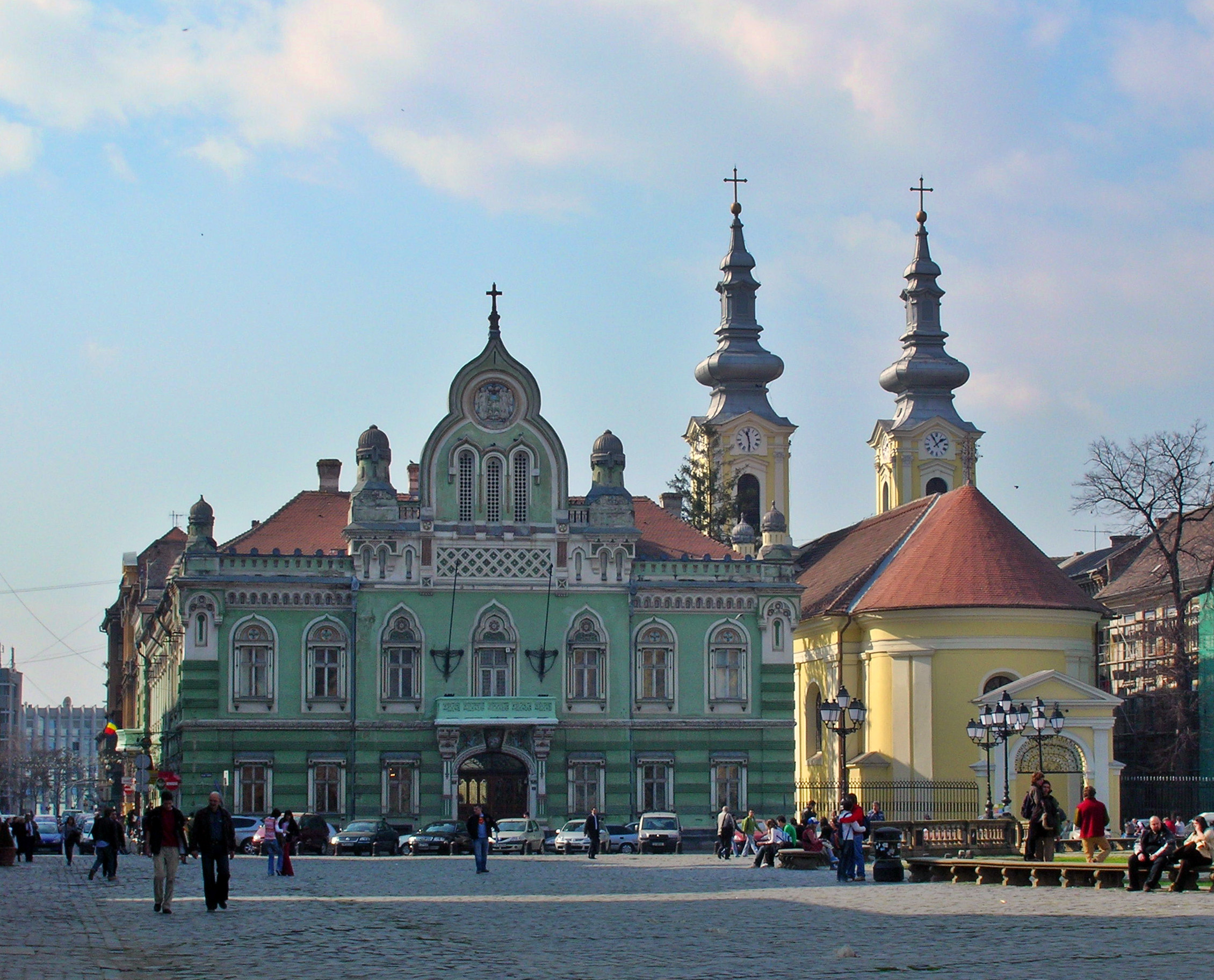
The Palace and Cathedral of Serbian Orthodox Church eparchy in Timișoara, capital of the Voivodeship of Serbia and Banat of Temeschwar

=== 1846 ===
According to the 1846 census, the territory that in 1849 formed the voivodeship included:

- Vlachs (Romanians) = 417,000
- Serbs = 402,000
- Germans = 352,000
- Hungarians = 233,000
- Slovaks = 27,000
- Bulgarians = 24,000
- Jews = 16,000
- Romani = 12,000
- Rusyns = 7,000
- Croats = 3,000
- Greeks = 3,000

=== 1857 ===
In 1857, population of the voivodeship numbered 1,526,105 inhabitants, including:

- Latin Catholics = 698,189 (45.75%)
- Eastern Orthodox Christians = 691,828 (45.33%)
- Evangelic-Lutherans = 56,871 (3.73%)
- Evangelic-Reformists = 29,281 (1.92%)
- Greek Catholics and Armenian Catholics = 26,244 (1.72%)
- Jews = 23,203 (1.52%)
- others = 489 (0.03%)

=== 1850/51 ===
According to the 1850/51 census, ethnic composition of the voivodeship was as follows:

- Romanians = 347,459
- Germans = 335,080
- Serbs = 321,110 (*)
- Hungarians = 221,845
- Bunjevci and Šokci = 62,936 (*)
- Rusins = 39,914
- Slovaks = 25,607
- Bulgarians = 22,780
- Jews = 15,507
- Gypsies/Romani = 11,440
- Czechs = 7,530
- Croats = 2,860 (*)
- Greeks and Cincars = 2,820

(*) Total number of "Illyrian Slavs" (Serbs, Bunjevci, Šokci, and Croats) was 386,906.

According to another source, in 1850/1851, the population of the voivodeship numbered 1,426,221 inhabitants, including:

- 397,459 (27.87%) Romanians
- 335,080 (23.49%) Germans
- 321,110 (22.52%) Serbs
- 221,845 (15.56%) Hungarians
- others.

By religious makeup:

In 1851, population of the voivodeship numbered 1,426,221 inhabitants, including:

- Eastern Orthodox Christians = 694,029 (48.66%)
- Roman Catholics = 624,839 (43.81%)
- Evangelic-Lutherans = 51,724 (3.63%)
- Evangelic-Reformists = 26,621 (1.87%)
- Jews = 16,252 (1.14%)
- Greek Catholics and Armenian Catholics = 12,756 (0.89%)

=== 1860 ===
In 1860, population of the voivodeship numbered 1,525,523 inhabitants, including:

- 432,523 Serbs
- 414,490 Romanians
- 396,156 Germans
- 256,164 Hungarians

== Administrative divisions ==
At first, the crown land was divided into two districts:

1. Batschka-Torontal (Bačka-Torontal)
2. Temeschwar-Karasch (Timișoara-Caraș)

Later, it was divided into five districts (contemporary German: Districte, modern spelling Distrikte), which were largely based on the pre-1849 Hungarian counties which made the majority of the crown land. From 1851 they were subdivided into political districts ((politische) Bezirke). In the reforms of 1853, implemented in the crown land in 1854, the Districte became Kreise, which were subdivided into Amtsbezirke (formally Bezirke but of a different type than in 1851). These reforms also separated the capital, the city of Temesvár, from district-administration, placing it under the direct authority of the Statthalterei.

Official name		Other native names (district capital)	extent	Bezirke		population (1850)
1851	1854	Other native names (district capital)	extent	1851 (political districts)	1854 (office districts)	population (1850)
Temesvárer District	Kreis Temesvár	German: Temeswar/Temeschwar; Romanian: Timișoara; Serbian: Temišvar	pre-1849 Temes County	Neu-Arad (Aradul Nou, Újarad; now part of Arad); Lippa (Lipova); Temesvár; Csakova (Ciacova, Csák, Čakovo; modern German: Tschakowa); Werschetz (Vršac, Versec, Vârșeț)	1. Temesvár (environs); 2. Neu-Arad; 3. Lippa; 4. Csakova; 5. Werschetz; 6. Buziasch (Buziaș, Buziásfürdő; modern German: Busiasch)	316,565, including: 159,292 Romanians; 101,339 Germans; 34,263 Serbs; 12,412 Hungarians; 3,664 Bulgarians; 2,307 Šokci; 1,650 Slovaks
Lugoser District	Kreis Lugos	German: Lugosch; Romanian: Lugoj; Serbian: Lugoš	pre-1849 Krassó County	Lugos; Facset (Făget, Facsád, Fatschet); Oravitza (Oravița, Oravicabánya, Oravica; modern German Orawitz); Boksan (Bocșa, Boksánbánya; modern German: Deutsch-Bokschan)	1. Lugos; 2. Facset; 3. Oraviza; 4. Bogsan	229,363, including: 197,363 Romanians; 21,179 Germans; 8,305 Bulgarians; 1,505 Hungarians; 612 Serbs
Groß-Becskereker District	Kreis Gross-Becskerek	modern German: Großbetschkerek; Hungarian: Nagybecskerek; Serbian: Veliki Bečkerek, modern Zrenjanin	pre-1849 Torontál County	St. Miklos (Sânnicolau Mare, Veliki Semikluš; modern Hungarian: Nagyszentmiklós; modern German: Groß Sankt Nikolaus); Hatzfeld (Jimbolia, Zsombolya, Žombolj); Türkisch-Kanisá (Novi Kneževac, Noul Cnezat, Neu-Kanischa, Törökkanizsa); Gross-Kikinda (Kikinda, Nagykikinda, Chichinda Mare; modern German: Großkikinda); Moros [sic] (Modosch, Modoš, Módos, Modoș; modern Jaša Tomić); Becskerek	1. Gross-Becskerek; 2. Türkisch-(Neu-)Becse (Novi Bečej, Neu-Betsche); 3. Modos (Modosch); 4. Gross-Kikinda; 5. Türkisch-(Neu-)Kanischa; 6. Gross-St.-Miklos; 7. Hatzfeld; 8. Billet (Biled, Billéd; modern German: Billed)	388,704, including: 126,730 Germans; 124,111 Serbs; 60,781 Hungarians; 58,292 Romanians; 11,045 Bulgarians; 3,752 Croats; 2,562 Slovaks; 1,421 Jews
Zombórer District	Kreis Zombor	Serbian: Sombor	the northern part of the pre-1849 Bács-Bodrog County	Zombór; Baja; Theresiopel (Subotica); Kula	1. Zombor; 2. Apathin (Apatin); 3. Kula; 4. Baja; 5. Maria-Theresiopel; 6. Zenta (Senta)	376,366, including: 160,016 Hungarians; 103,886 Germans; 53,908 Bunjevci; 40,054 Serbs; 7,830 Jews
Neusatzer District	Kreis Neusatz	Hungarian: Újvidék; Serbian: Novi Sad	the southern part of the pre-1849 Bács-Bodrog County and the formerly Syrmian districts of Ruma and Illok	Neusatz; Palanka (Plankenburg); Becse (Alt Betsche, Bečej); Illok (Ilok); Ruma	1. Neusatz; 2. Alt-Becse; 3. Palanka; 4. Ruma; 5. Illok	236,943, including: 100,382 Serbs; 45,936 Germans; 30,450 Hungarians; 20,683 Slovaks; 13,665 Šokci; 2,098 Jews

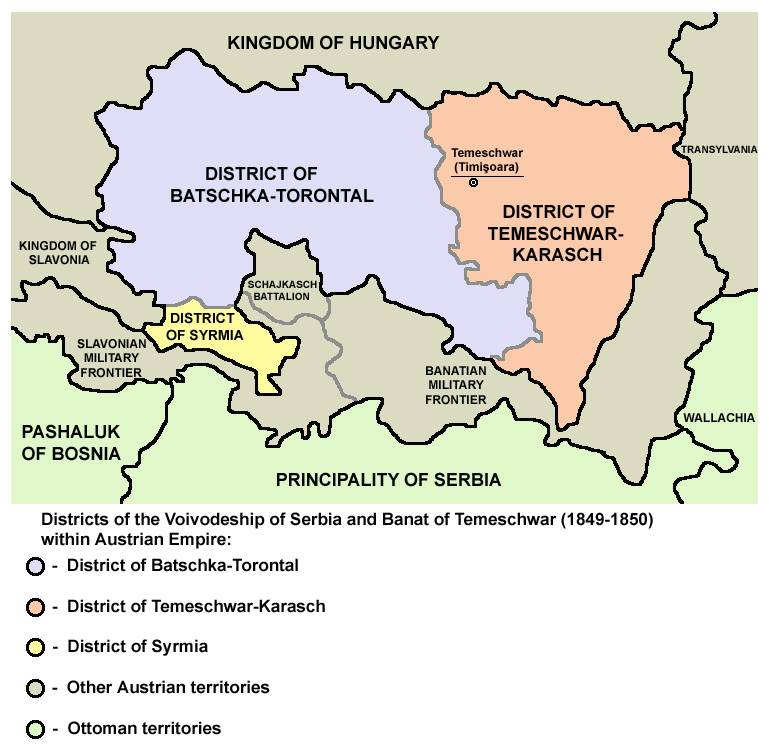
Districts of the Voivodeship of Serbia and Temes Banat (1849-1850).

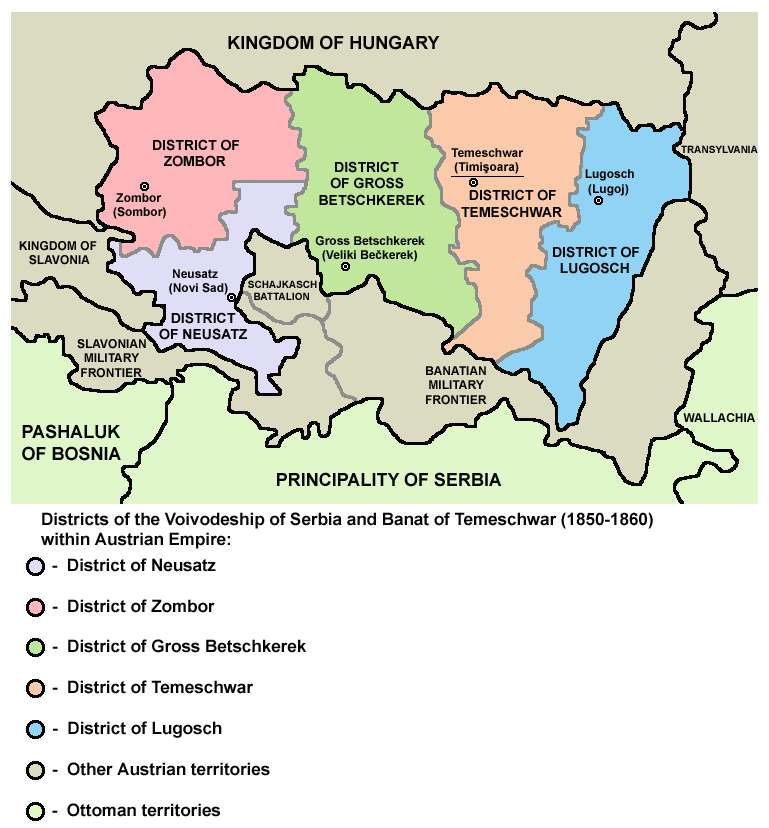
Districts of the Voivodeship of Serbia and Temes Banat (1850-1860).

== Administration ==
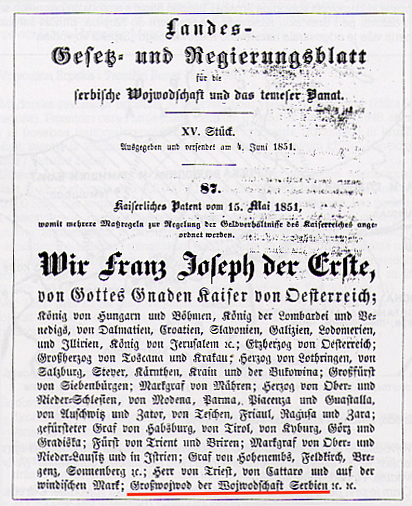
Titles of the Habsburg emperor in an historical document from 1851: among other titles, emperor Francis Joseph I was also great voivode of the Voivodeship of Serbia (German: Grosswojwod der Wojwodschaft Serbien).

=== Great Voivodes ===
- Francis Joseph I, (1849–1916)
- Charles I, (1916–1918)

Note: the voivodeship was abolished in 1860, but Francis Joseph kept the title of "Great Voivode" until his death in 1916, and the title was also inherited by the last Emperor of Austria, Charles I.

=== Governors ===
- Ferdinand Mayerhofer, (1849–1851)
- Johann Coronini-Cronberg, (1851–1859)
- Josip Šokčević, (1859–1860)
- Karl Bigot de Saint-Quentin, (1860)

== See also ==
- Serbian Vojvodina
- May Assembly
- History of Vojvodina
- History of Serbia
- Kingdom of Hungary (1526–1867)

== Sources ==
- Bataković, Dušan T., ed. (2005). Histoire du peuple serbe [History of the Serbian People] (in French). Lausanne: L’Age d’Homme. ISBN 978-2-8251-1958-7.
- Bataković, Dušan T. (2014). The Foreign Policy of Serbia (1844-1867): IIija Garašanin's Načertanije. Belgrade: Institute for Balkan Studies. ISBN 978-86-7179-089-5.
- Ćirković, Sima (2004). The Serbs. Malden: Blackwell Publishing. ISBN 978-1-4051-4291-5.
- Gavrilović, Vladan (2021). "The Serbian Vojvodina and Montenegro: 1848-1849". Istraživanja: Journal of historical researches. 32 (32): 133–143. doi:10.19090/i.2021.32.133-143.
- Gavrilović, Vladan (2023). "The Serbian Vojvodina: Idea and borders until 1918". Istraživanja: Journal of historical researches. 34: 112–120.
- Jelavich, Barbara (1983). History of the Balkans: Eighteenth and Nineteenth Centuries. Vol. 1. Cambridge: Cambridge University Press. ISBN 978-0-521-25249-2.
- Krestić, Vasilije (1997). History of the Serbs in Croatia and Slavonia 1848–1914. Belgrade: BIGZ. ISBN 978-86-13-00888-0.
- Markus, Tomislav (2010). "The Serbian question in Croatian politics, 1848-1918". Review of Croatian History. 6: 165–188.
- Pavlowitch, Stevan K. (2002). Serbia: The History behind the Name. London: Hurst & Company. ISBN 978-1-85065-477-3.
- Stavrianos, Leften (2000) [1958]. The Balkans Since 1453. London: Hurst & Company. ISBN 978-1-85065-551-0.
