= Torontál County =

County of the Kingdom of Hungary

Torontal County Comitatus Torontaliensis (Latin) Torontál vármegye (Hungarian) Komitat Torontal (German) Торонталска жупанија (Serbian) Comitatul Torontal (Romanian)
- County of the Kingdom of Hungary (14th century-1526); County of the Eastern Hungarian Kingdom (1526-1551); County of the Kingdom of Hungary (1551-1552); County of the Kingdom of Hungary (1779-1849, 1860-1923)
- Coat of arms

- Capital: Aracsa; Nagy-Becskerek (1779-1807, 1820-1920); Nagyszentmiklós (1807-1820); Kiszombor (1920-1923)
- Area
  - Coordinates: 45°23′N 20°24′E
  - 1910: 10,016 km^{2} (3,867 sq mi)
- Population
  - 1910: 615,151
- History
  - Established: 14th century
  - Ottoman conquest: 1552
  - County recreated: 23 April 1779
  - Disestablished: 18 November 1849
  - County recreated: 27 December 1860
  - Treaty of Trianon: 4 June 1920
  - Merged into Csanád-Arad-Torontál County: 1923
- Today part of: Serbia (7,261 km^{2}); Romania (2,497 km^{2}); Hungary (258 km^{2})
- Vranjevo, Zrenjanin and Sânnicolau Mare are the current names of the capitals.

Torontál (Hungarian: Torontál, German: Torontal, Serbian: Торонтал, Romanian: Torontal) was an administrative county (comitatus) of the Kingdom of Hungary. Its territory is now divided between Serbia and Romania, except for a small area which is part of Hungary. The capital of the county was Nagybecskerek (Serbian: Велики Бечкерек, German: Großbetschkerek, Romanian: Becicherecu Mare), the current Zrenjanin.

== Geography ==
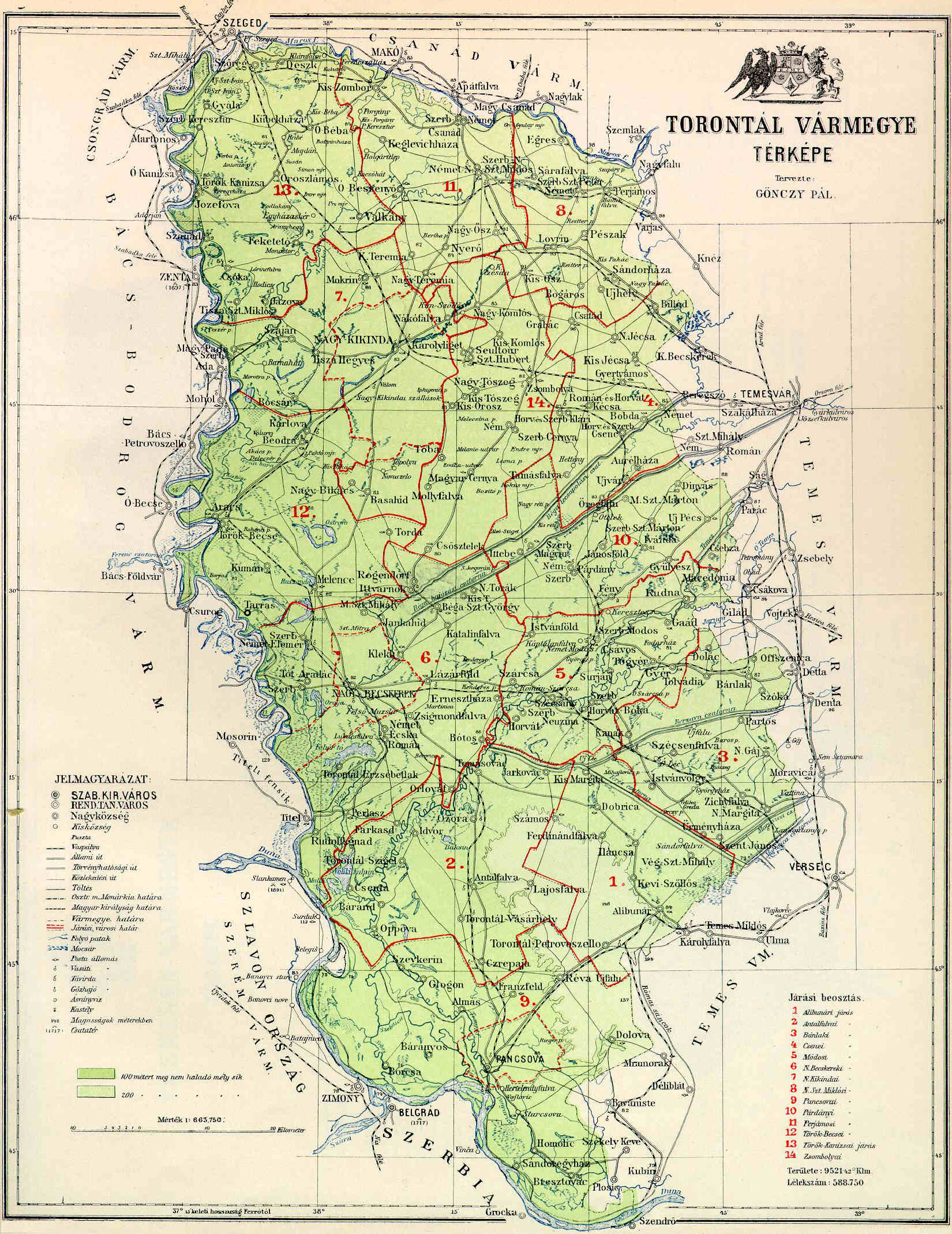
Torontál county in 1891

Torontál county was located in the Banat region. From its recreation in 1779 until its partition in 1920 it shared borders with the Hungarian counties of Bács-Bodrog, Csongrád, Csanád, Arad and Temes.

The Banat Military Frontier lay along its southern border until it was abolished in 1873, after which the river Danube formed its southern border, which it shared with the Principality of Serbia (Kingdom of Serbia after 1882), and the Slavonian Military Frontier (Croatian-Slavonian county of Syrmia after 1881).

The river Tisza formed its western border and the river Maros (Mureș) its northern border. The rivers Aranca, Bega, Timiș and Bârzava flowed through the county. Its area was 10,042 km^{2} (3,877 sq mi) around 1910.

== History ==
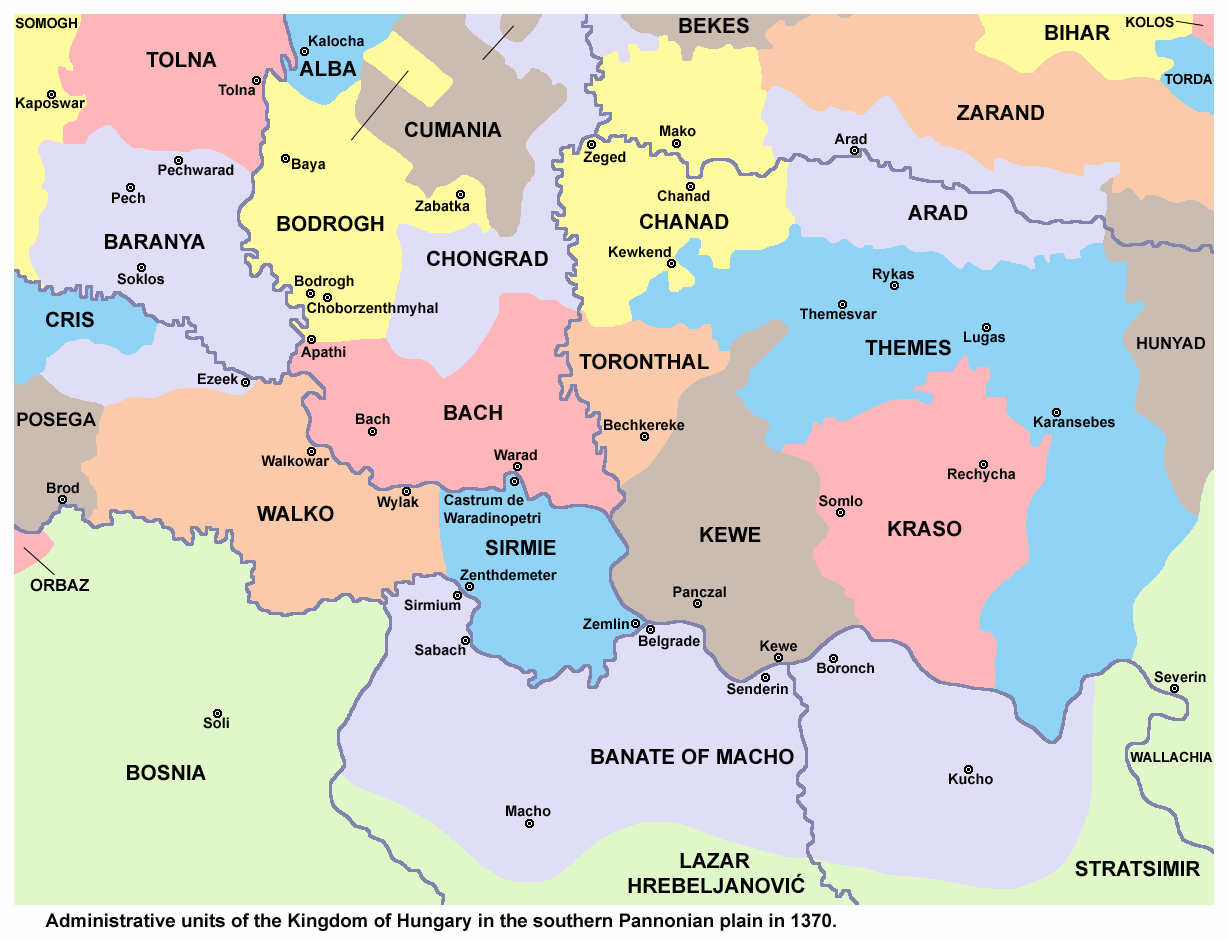
Torontál county in 1370

Torontál county was formed before the 15th century, within the medieval Kingdom of Hungary. Initially, the capital was at Aracs/Vranjevo (now a part of the town of Novi Bečej), and the county existed until this area was taken by the Ottoman Empire in 1552. During Ottoman administration, this territory was included into the Ottoman Temeşvar Eyalet. In 1594, the region was affected by the anti-Ottoman Banat uprising of local Christians, mainly Serbs and Romanians.

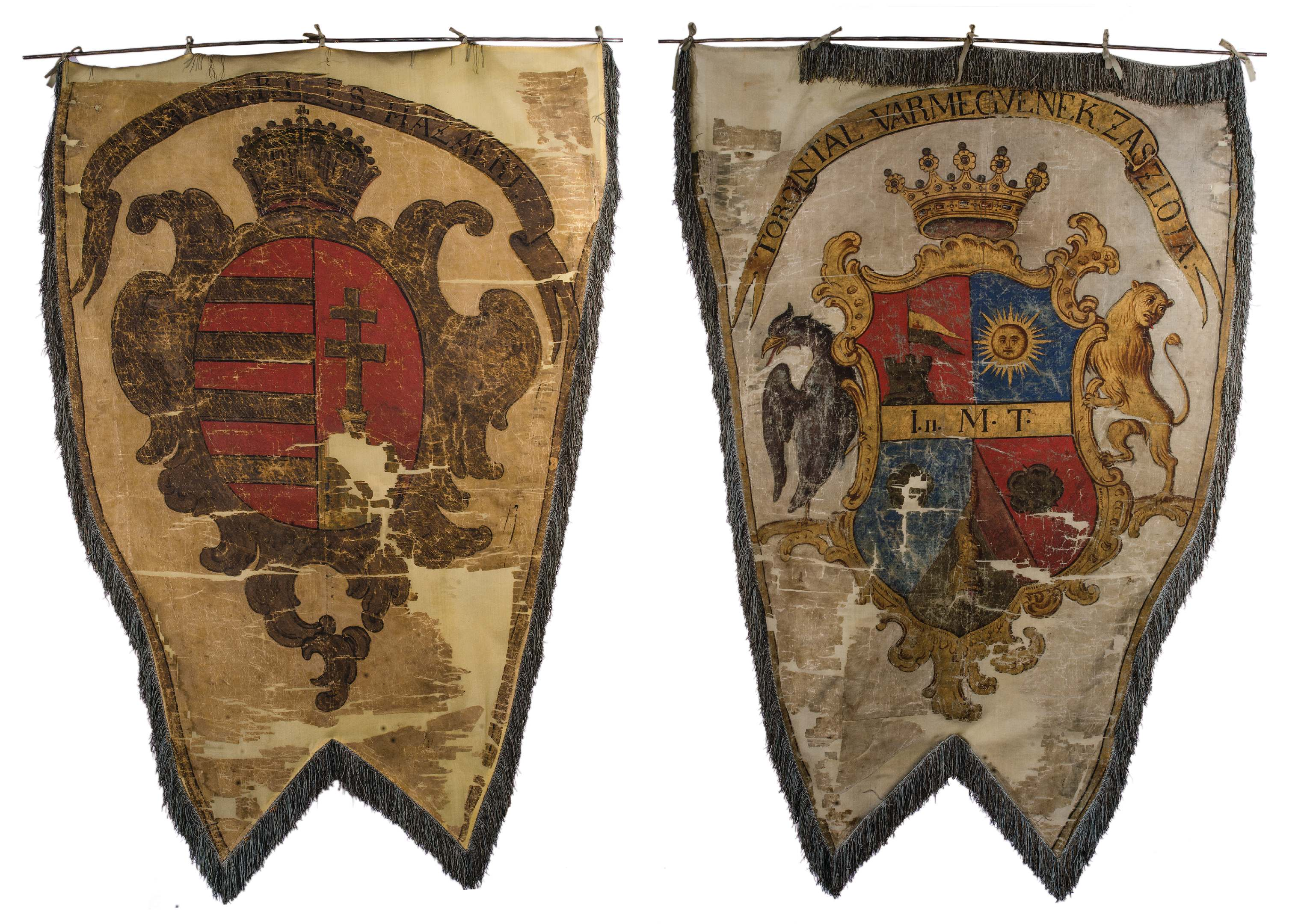
Torontál county flag, late 18th century

During the Great Turkish War (1683-1699), much of the region was temporarily liberated, but under the Treaty of Karlowitz (1699) it was returned to the Ottoman rule. The region finally was captured by the Habsburg monarchy during the next Austro-Turkish War (1716–1718). Under the Treaty of Passarowitz (1718) it became a Habsburg possession, and was included into the Banat of Temeswar.

This province was abolished in 1778 and it was incorporated into the Habsburg Kingdom of Hungary. Torontal county was restored in 1779, with significantly different borders than in medieval times. Its center was moved temporarily to Nagyszentmiklós (present-day Sânnicolau Mare) between 1807 and 1820 due to a great fire in Nagybecskerek (present-day Zrenjanin).

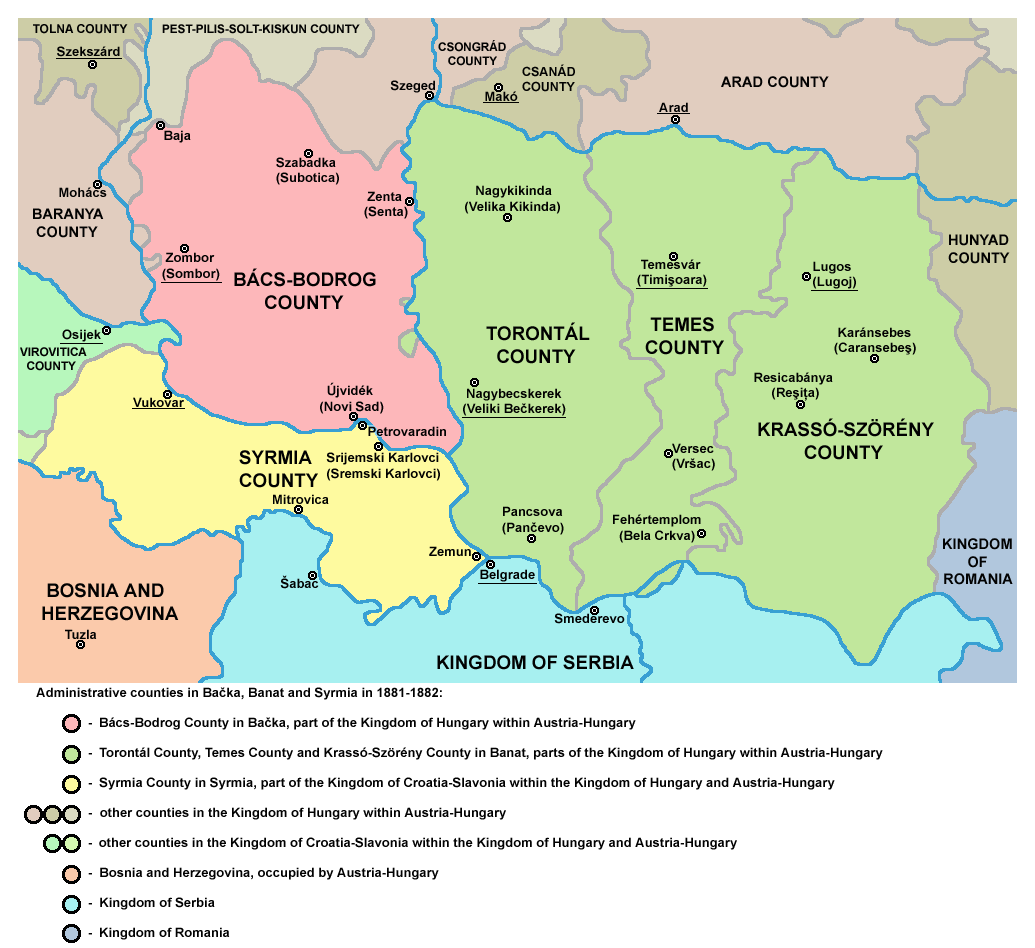
Bács-Bodrog, Syrmia, Torontál, Temes and Krassó-Szörény counties after 1881, the five counties which were formed in the territory of the former Voivodeship of Serbia and Temes Banat

In 1848/1849 the area of the county was claimed by the self-proclaimed Serbian Vojvodina, while between 1849 and 1860 it was part of the Voivodeship of Serbia and Temes Banat, a separate Austrian crownland. After 1853, the county did not exist since the voivodeship was divided into districts. After the voivodeship was abolished in 1860, the area was reincorporated into the Habsburg Kingdom of Hungary and the county was recreated in January 1861. In 1876, when the administrative structure of the Kingdom of Hungary was changed, the borders of Torontal County were modified to include the District of Velika Kikinda. A few years prior, parts of the territory of the former Banat Military Frontier (including Pancsova/Pančevo, formerly the seat of the so-called German Regiment) had also been annexed to it.

In the autumn of 1918, at the end of the First World War, the ephemeral Banat Republic was proclaimed in Timișoara, and also claimed Torontál county, but the attempt to create a Banatian state failed. Under the Armistice of Belgrade (13 November), armed forces of Austria-Hungary were obligated to retreated from the territory of Bács-Bodrog county, and the region was possessed by the Allied Army of the Orient, thus allowing the Serbian Royal Army to establish effective control south of the Baja-Szeged-Mureș line.

By that time, the process of political dissolution of Austria-Hungary already entered its final stages, and on 16 November the First Hungarian Republic was proclaimed. In the same time, local Serbian and other Slavic leaders organized the Great People's Assembly of Serbs, Bunjevci and other Slavs in Banat, Bačka and Baranja, that was held on 25 November in Novi Sad, and proclaimed the unification of those regions (Banat, Bačka and Baranja, including the Torontál county), into the Kingdom of Serbia. Several days later, on 1 December 1918, the Kingdom of Serbs, Croats and Slovenes was proclaimed, encompassing Serbia with Montenegro, and South Slavic provinces of the former Austria-Hungary. Thus, two countries laid claims on the Torontál county, the Hungarian Republic and the Yugoslav Kingdom.

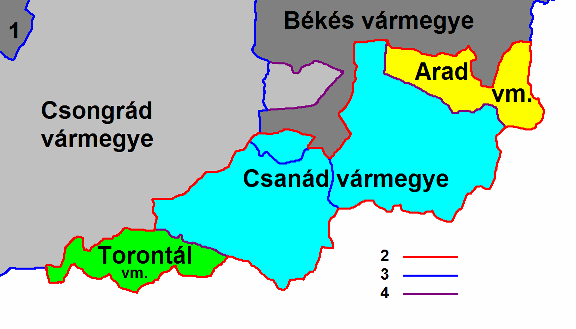
Csanád, Arad and Torontál counties after the Treaty of Trianon. In 1923, the three counties were merged to form Csanád-Arad-Torontál County

The question was finally settled by the Treaty of Trianon of 1920, and the area of the county was divided between the Yugoslav Kingdom, Romania, and Hungary. Most of the county was assigned to the Kingdom of Serbs, Croats and Slovenes (which was later renamed to Yugoslavia). The north-eastern part of the county was assigned to Romania, and the northernmost part of the county (a small area south of Szeged, comprising Kiszombor and 8 surrounding villages) was assigned to Hungary and became part of the newly formed county of Csanád-Arad-Torontál in 1923.

The Yugoslav part of the pre-1920 Torontál county (the western Banat region) is now part of Serbia (mostly in the autonomous region of Vojvodina, except the small part near Belgrade, which is part of Belgrade Region). The Romanian part is now part of Timiș county (called Timiș-Torontal between 1919 and 1950). The Hungarian part is now part of Csongrád County.

== Demographics ==
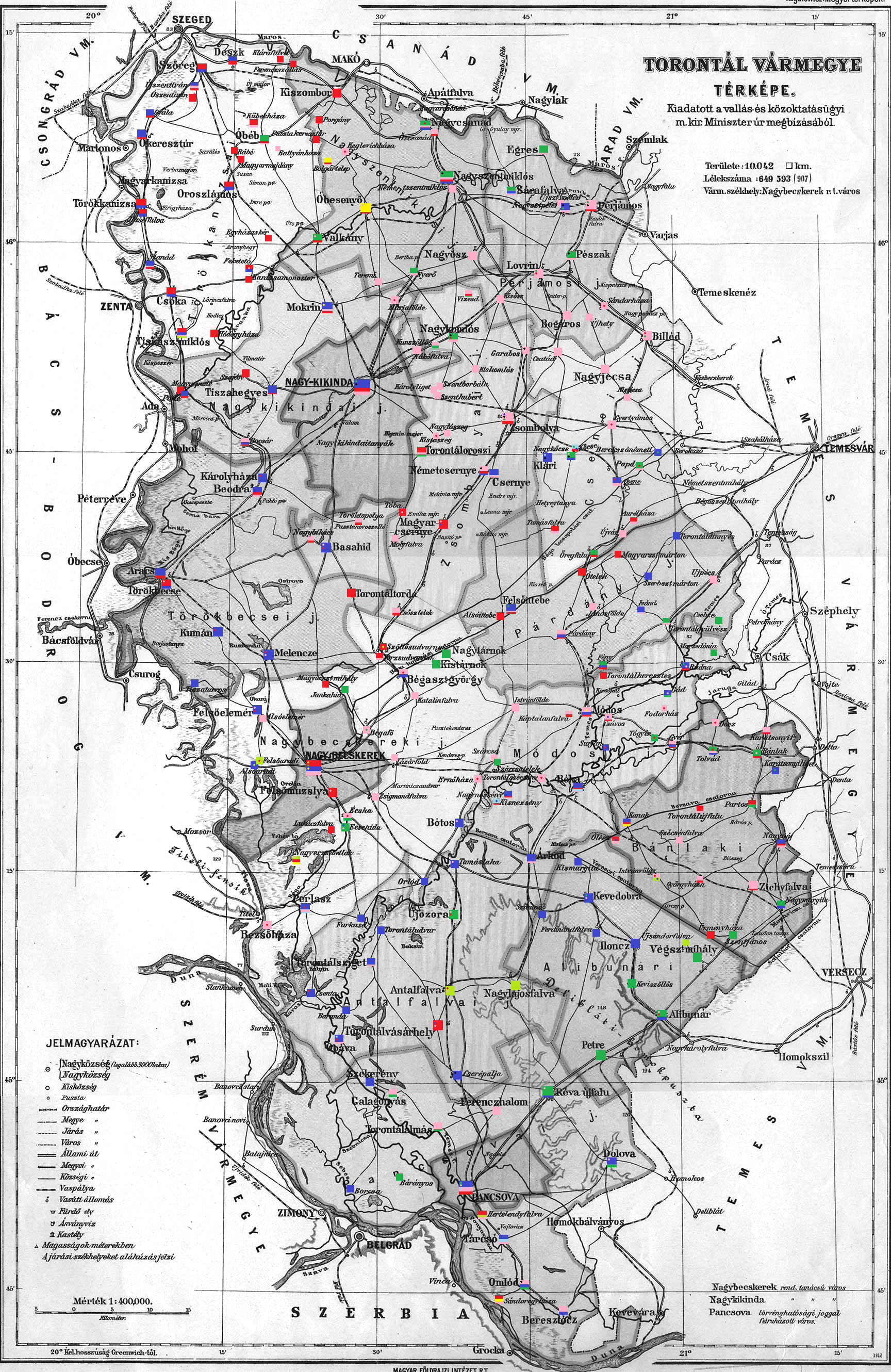
Ethnic map of the county with data of the 1910 census (see the key in the description).

Population by mother tongue (Note: Only linguistic communities > 1% are displayed.)
Census	Total	Serbian	German	Hungarian	Romanian	Slovak	Other or unknown
1880	530,988	169,006 (33.31%) (Note: Serbian and Croatian.)	158,077 (31.15%)	78,278 (15.43%)	78,102 (15.39%)	12,213 (2.41%)	11,743 (2.31%)
1890	588,750	186,231 (31.63%)	184,827 (31.39%)	98,129 (16.67%)	87,445 (14.85%)	14,031 (2.38%)	18,087 (3.07%)
1900	609,362	191,857 (31.48%)	184,016 (30.20%)	114,760 (18.83%)	88,044 (14.45%)	14,969 (2.46%)	15,716 (2.58%)
1910	615,151	199,750 (32.47%)	165,779 (26.95%)	128,405 (20.87%)	86,937 (14.13%)	16,143 (2.62%)	18,137 (2.95%) (Note: Most of them Bulgarian, Croat and Roma.)

Population by religion (Note: Only religious communities > 1% are displayed.)
Census	Total	Eastern Orthodox	Roman Catholic	Lutheran	Calvinist	Jewish	Other or unknown
1880	530,988	251,414 (47.35%)	242,457 (45.66%)	18,657 (3.51%)	8,111 (1.53%)	6,672 (1.26%)	3,677 (0.69%)
1890	588,750	271,263 (46.07%)	273,610 (46.47%)	20,848 (3.54%)	10,504 (1.78%)	7,139 (1.21%)	5,386 (0.91%)
1900	609,362	277,558 (45.55%)	284,704 (46.72%)	22,524 (3.70%)	12,195 (2.00%)	6,750 (1.11%)	5,631 (0.92%)
1910	615,151	286,642 (46.60%)	279,793 (45.48%)	24,905 (4.05%)	12,549 (2.04%)	6,114 (0.99%)	5,148 (0.84%)

== Subdivisions ==
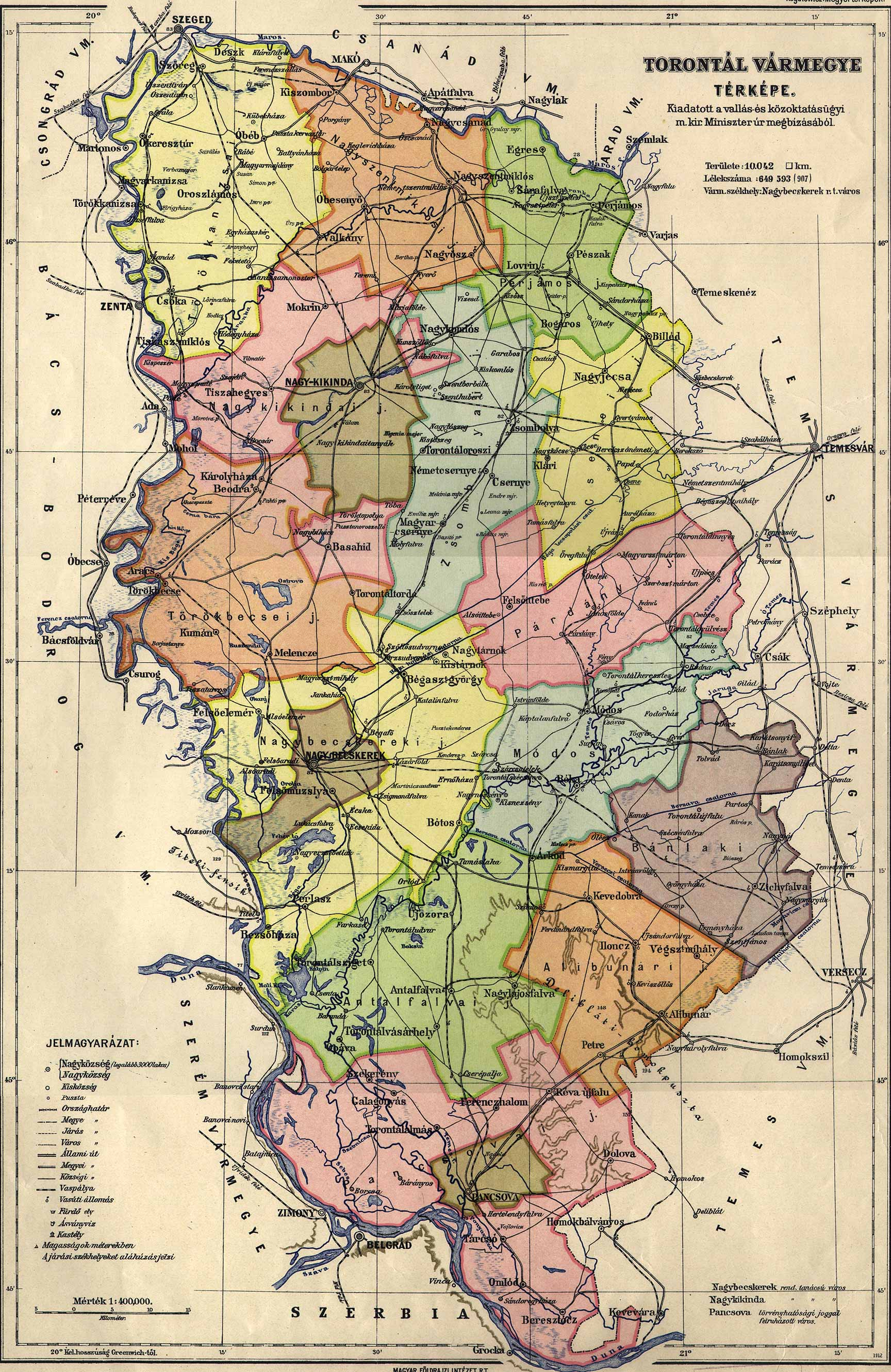

In the early 20th century, the subdivisions of Torontál county were:

Districts (járás)
District	Capital
Alibunári járás	Alibunár (now Alibunar, Serbia)
Antalfalvai járás	Antalfalva (now Kovačica, Serbia)
Bánlaki járás	Bánlak (now Banloc, Romania)
Csenei járás	Csene (now Cenei, Romania)
Módosi járás	Módos (now Jaša Tomić, Serbia)
Nagybecskereki járás	Nagy-Becskerek (now Zrenjanin, Serbia)
Nagykikindai járás	Nagy-Kikinda (now Kikinda, Serbia)
Nagyszentmiklósi járás	Nagyszentmiklós (now Sânnicolau Mare, Romania)
Pancsovai járás	Pancsova (now Pančevo, Serbia)
Párdányi járás	Párdány (now Međa, Serbia)
Perjámosi járás	Perjámos (now Periam, Romania)
Törökbecsei járás	Törökbecse (now Novi Bečej, Serbia)
Törökkanizsai járás	Törökkanizsa (now Novi Kneževac, Serbia)
Zsombolyai járás	Zsombolya (now Jimbolia, Romania)
Urban counties (törvényhatósági jogú város)
Pancsova (now Pančevo, Serbia)
Urban districts (rendezett tanácsú város)
Nagybecskerek (now Zrenjanin, Serbia)
Nagykikinda (now Kikinda, Serbia)

== See also ==
- Current North, Central and South Banat districts of Serbia.

== Sources ==
- Ćirković, Sima (2004). The Serbs. Malden: Blackwell Publishing.
- Curta, Florin (2019). Eastern Europe in the Middle Ages (500–1300). Leiden & Boston: Brill. ISBN 978-90-04-39519-0.
- Dabić, Vojin S. (2011). "The Habsburg-Ottoman War of 1716–1718 and Demographic Changes in the War-Afflicted Territories". The Peace of Passarowitz, 1718. West Lafayette: Purdue University Press. pp. 191–208.
- Dávid, Géza (1999). "The Eyalet of temesvár in the Eighteenth Century". Oriente Moderno. 79 (18): 113–128.
- Engel, Pál (2001). The Realm of St. Stephen: A History of Medieval Hungary, 895-1526. London & New York: Tauris. ISBN 978-1-86064-061-2.
- Gavrilović, Slavko (1993). "Serbs in Hungary, Slavonia and Croatia in struggles against the Turks (15th–18th centuries)". Serbs in European Civilization. Belgrade: Nova, Serbian Academy of Sciences and Arts, Institute for Balkan Studies. pp. 41–54.
- Krizman, Bogdan (1970). "The Belgrade Armistice of 13 November 1918". The Slavonic and East European Review. 48 (110): 67–87.
- Pálosfalvi, Tamás (2018). From Nicopolis to Mohács: A History of Ottoman-Hungarian Warfare, 1389-1526. Leiden & Boston: Brill. ISBN 978-90-04-37565-9.
- Točanac-Radović, Isidora (2022). "The Great Migration of Serbs and the Question of the Serbian Ethnic and Religious Community in the Habsburg Monarchy". Migrations in the Slavic Cultural Space: From the Middle Ages to the Present Day. Łódź: Łódź University Press. pp. 15–27.
