= Bezirk =

German term referting to several types of administrative divisions

The German term Bezirk (German pronunciation: [bəˈtsɪʁk]; pl. Bezirke [bəˈtsɪʁkə]; derived from Latin: circulus, "circle") translated as "district". It can refer to several types of administrative divisions or areas:

- Stadtbezirk, a subdivision of a city in the sense of a borough (e.g. in Berlin, Hamburg or Vienna), often again subdivided into several quarters and neighbourhoods. According to German Gemeindeordnung codes, the city council resolves upon the implementation by municipal by-law (Satzung). In some cities the Bezirke have limited powers delegated to them by the city's local government, including an assembly resulting from local elections and an own 'mayor' (Bürgermeister). In the German states of Hesse and Rhineland-Palatinate any municipality is authorized to implement Ortsbezirke with own advisory councils and local administrators. The state law in North Rhine-Westphalia commits the municipal administration of an independent city to subdivide the urban area into Stadtbezirke.
- In Austria, the word Bezirk is used with different meanings in three different contexts:
  - Some of the tasks of the administrative branch of the national and regional governments are fulfilled by the 95 district captaincies (Bezirkshauptmannschaften, also translated as district administrative office). The area a district administrative office is responsible for is often, although informally, called a district (Bezirk). A number of statutory cities, currently 15, are not served by any district administrative office. Their respective municipal bureaucracies handle the tasks normally performed by the district administrative office.
  - The cities of Vienna and Graz are divided into municipal districts (Stadtbezirke), assisting the respective municipal governments.
  - From the point of view of the judiciary of Austria, the country is subdivided into 115 judicial districts (Gerichtsbezirke), each corresponding to one of the country's 115 lowest-level trial courts.
- The Italian autonomous provinces of Trentino and South Tyrol, are divided into Bezirksgemeinschaften (Italian: comunità comprensoriali).
- The districts of Switzerland are called Bezirke in several cantons. In Switzerland as a federal state, every canton is free to implement its own administrative structure. The intermediate administrative level above the Swiss municipalities is also referred to as Verwaltungsregion or Verwaltungskreis, Wahlkreis, Amtei or Amt, as well as French: districts in Suisse romande and Italian: distretto in Svizzera italiana. In Schwyz, the six historic Bezirke are self-governing bodies, some with regional Landsgemeinde assemblies, similar to the municipal Kreise of Graubünden. The six Bezirke of Appenzell Innerrhoden are identically equal to municipalities.
- Historically the primary administrative divisions of East Germany from 1952 were called Bezirke. They were implemented by an administrative reform to supersede the East German federated states of Brandenburg, Mecklenburg, Saxony, Saxony-Anhalt and Thuringia. The capital East Berlin was officially equated by resolution of the State Council of East Germany in 1961. Though legislative assemblies (Bezirkstage) and executive councils (Räte) existed, the Bezirke according to the top-down principle of democratic centralism enjoyed no autonomy nor any self-governing rights. They were abolished by law which the East German People's Chamber passed in 1990 on the eve of the German reunification.
- During the Second World War, a special administrative division of Nazi Germany was officially classified as "Bezirk": Bezirk Bialystok.

== See also ==
- Amtsbezirk, historic denotation of an administrative subdivision in Prussia; until 2009 also in the Swiss Canton of Bern
- Regierungsbezirk, "government region", a subdivision of some German federal states
