= Circle (administrative division) =

Type of administrative division

Circle is a type of administrative division of some countries. In Thailand the former monthon are translated as circle. The former Holy Roman Empire was organized into Imperial Circles (German: Reichskreise). Algerian daïras are circles.

== See also ==
- Cercles of Mali
- Cercle (French colonial)
- Kreis, Districts of Prussia
- Kreis, Districts of Germany
- Electoral Circle (German: Kurkreis)
