= Potisje =

Geographical region in Serbia

Potisje (Serbian: Потисје) is the name of the Tisa river basin parts located in Serbia. The river Tisa flows between the Banat and Bačka regions.

== History ==
In the 1st century AD, ancient author Plinius used the name Pathissus to describe the surroundings of the river Tisa. Because of the similarity of this name with the modern Slavic name Potisje (meaning approximately "a land around the river Tisa" in Slavic), which is a typical Slavic name used for surroundings of rivers (like Podunavlje, Pomoravlje, etc.), the name mentioned by Plinius might indicate an early Slavic presence in the area.

Between 1702 and 1751, the western part of Potisje (in the region of Bačka) belonged to the Tisa-Mureș (Potisje-Pomorišje) section of the Habsburg Military Frontier. The Potisje segment of the Frontier included towns near the river Tisa: Bečej, Ada, Senta and Kanjiža (in present-day Serbia), Szeged (in present-day Hungary), as well as other places in Bačka, including Subotica, Sombor and Sentomaš (Srbobran). After the abolishment of this part of the Frontier in 1751, many Serbs that lived in the region emigrated to Russia (notably to New Serbia and Slavo-Serbia). To prevent this emigration, the Habsburg authorities formed the autonomous District of Potisje with its seat in Bečej. The District of Potisje existed between 1751 and 1848. The three privileges were given to the district in 1759, 1774, and 1800. The first privilege of the District defined its autonomous status, while the second one allowed ethnic Hungarians to settle in the district. In the following period many Hungarians settled in Potisje and they replaced Serbs as the dominant ethnic group in parts of the region.

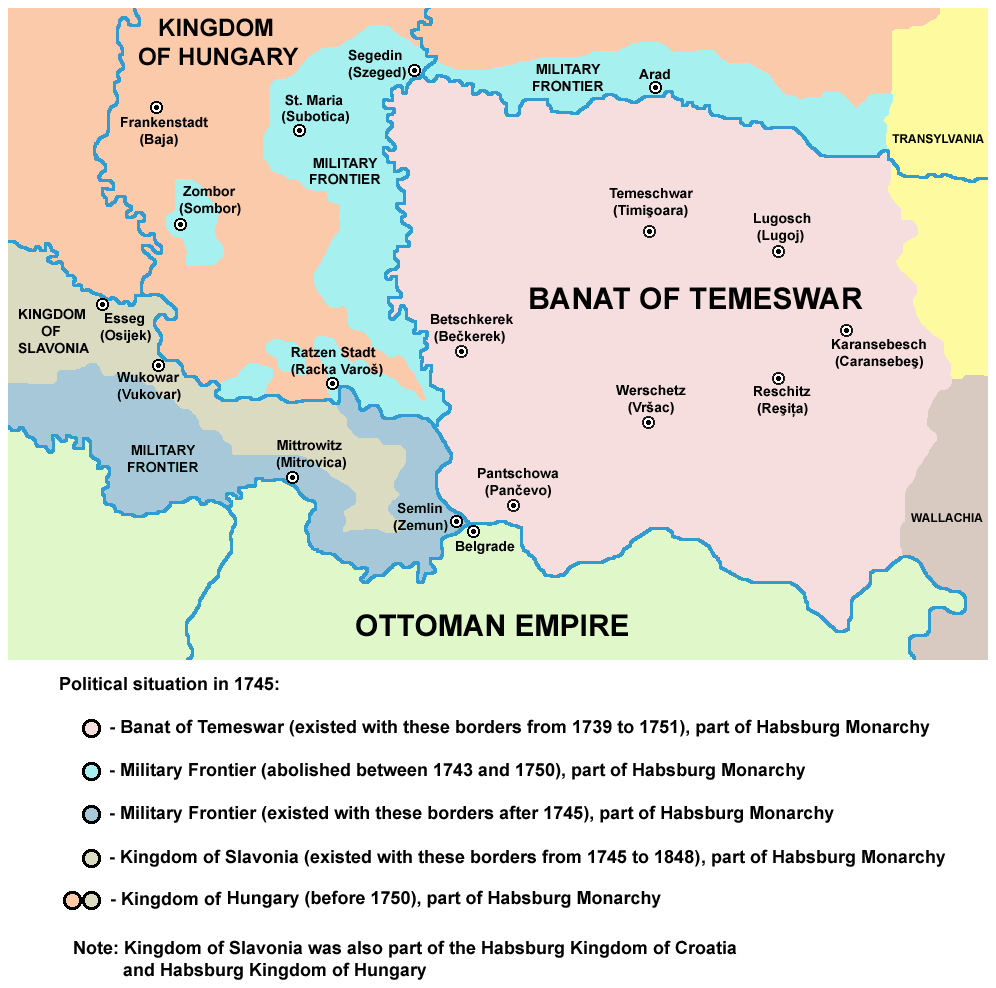
Military Frontier in Potisje in 1745

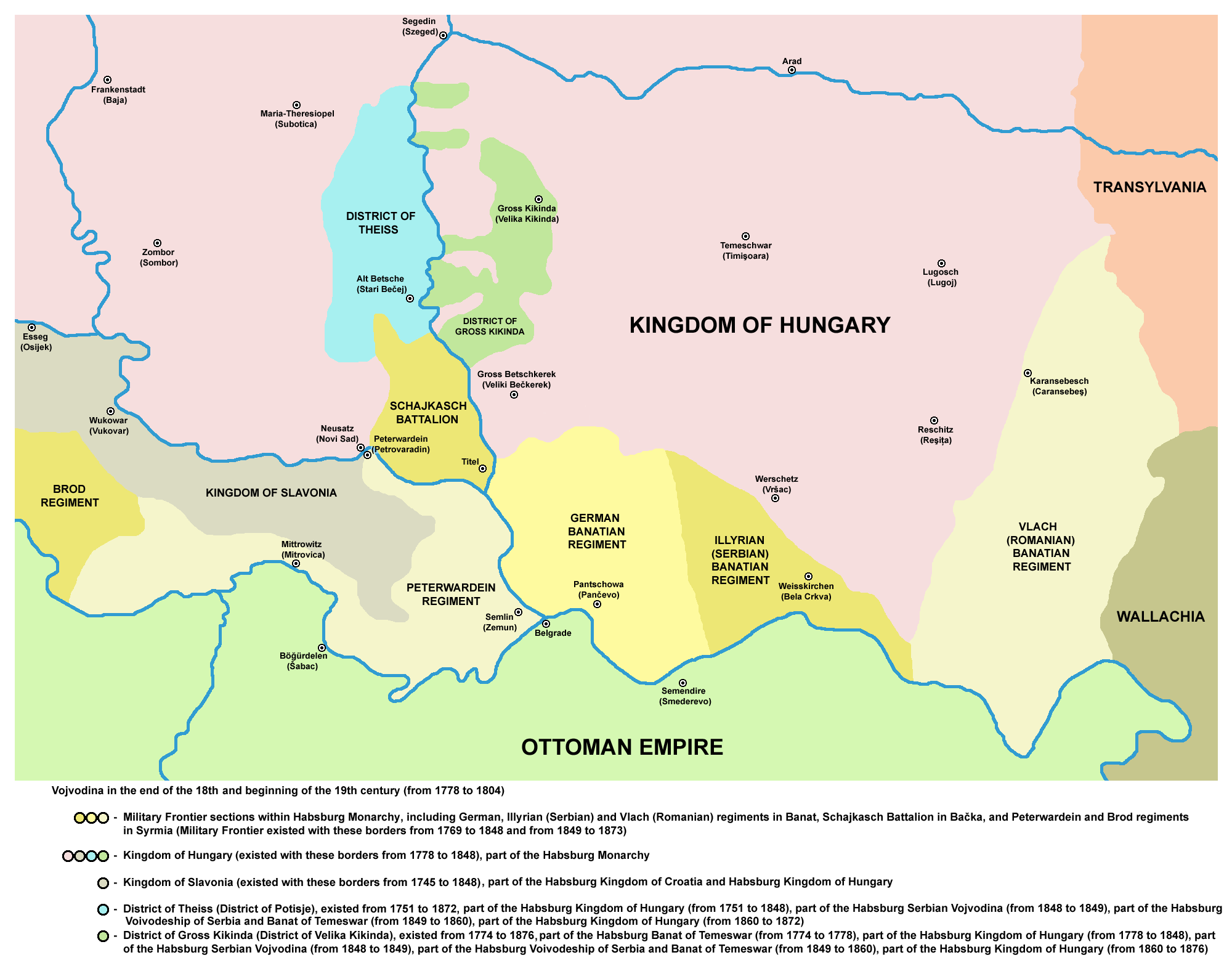
District of Potisje (1751-1848)

== Geography ==
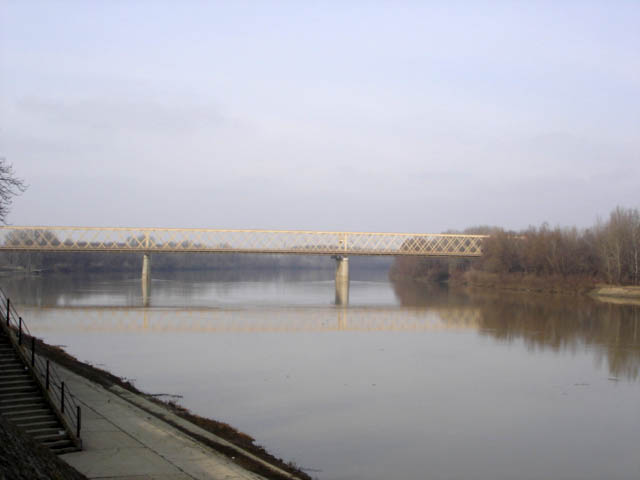
The bridge across Tisa in Senta

Municipalities in Bačka:

- Kanjiža
- Senta
- Ada
- Bečej
- Žabalj
- Titel

Municipalities in Banat:

- Novi Kneževac
- Čoka
- Kikinda
- Novi Bečej
- Zrenjanin

== Demographics ==
The municipalities with ethnic Serb majority are: Titel (85%), Žabalj (82%), Kikinda (76%), Zrenjanin (76%), Novi Bečej (68%), and Novi Kneževac (58%). In Bečej Serbs make up a relative majority of population (42%).

The municipalities with ethnic Hungarian majority are: Kanjiža (83%), Senta (75%), Ada (72%). In Čoka, Hungarians make up a relative majority of population (45%).

== Gallery ==
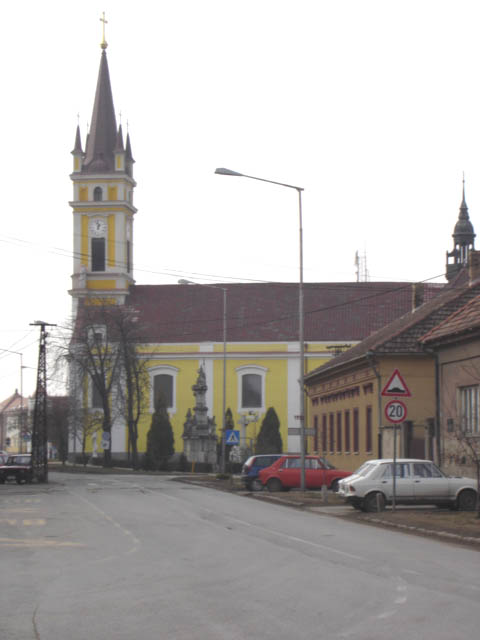
Kanjiža

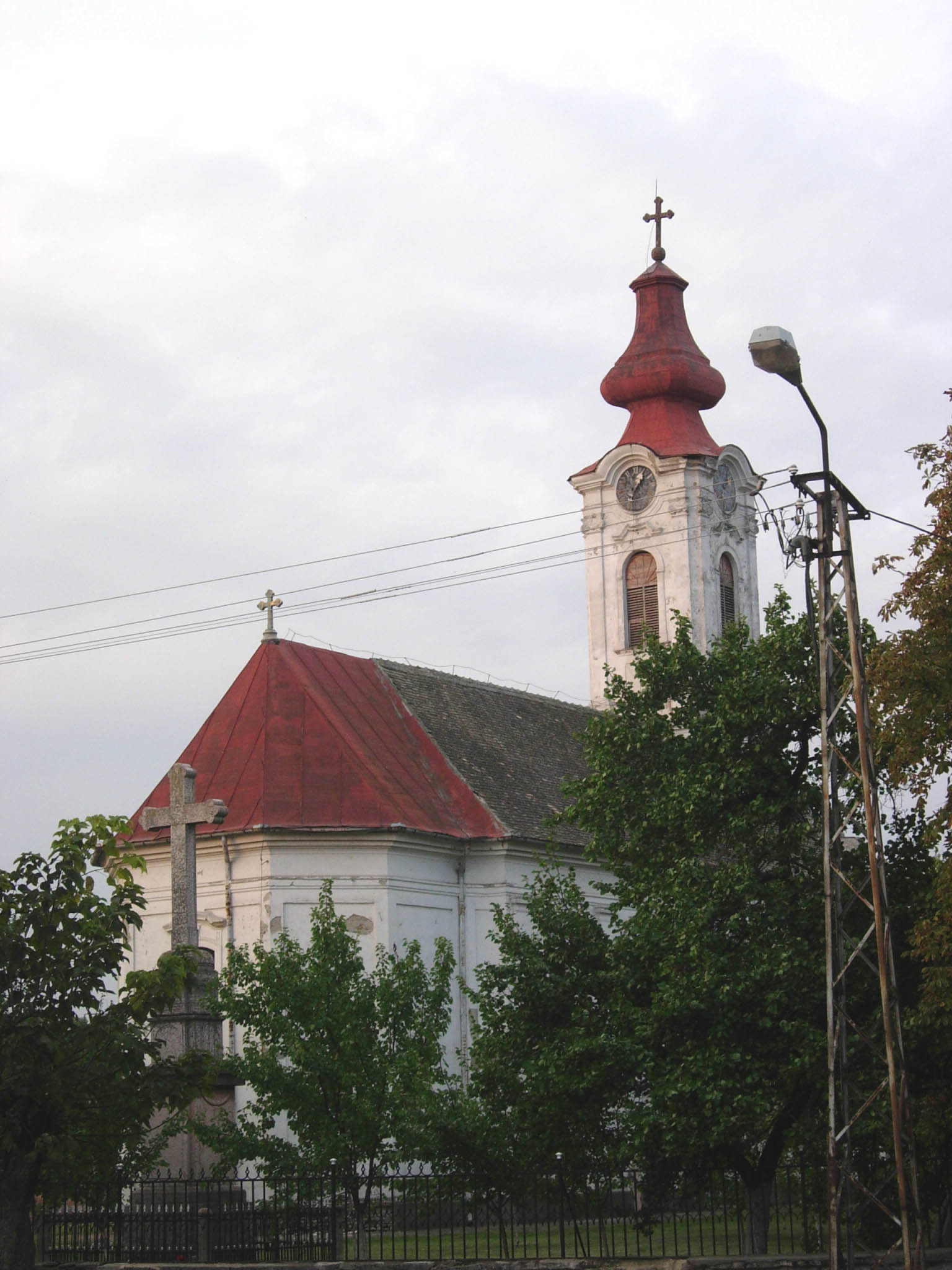
Novi Bečej

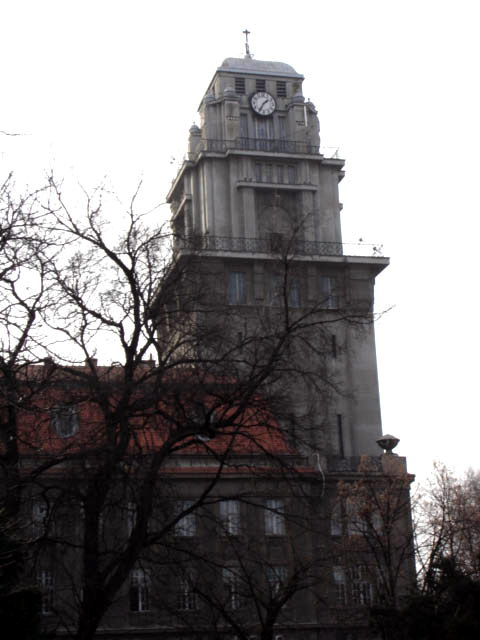
Senta

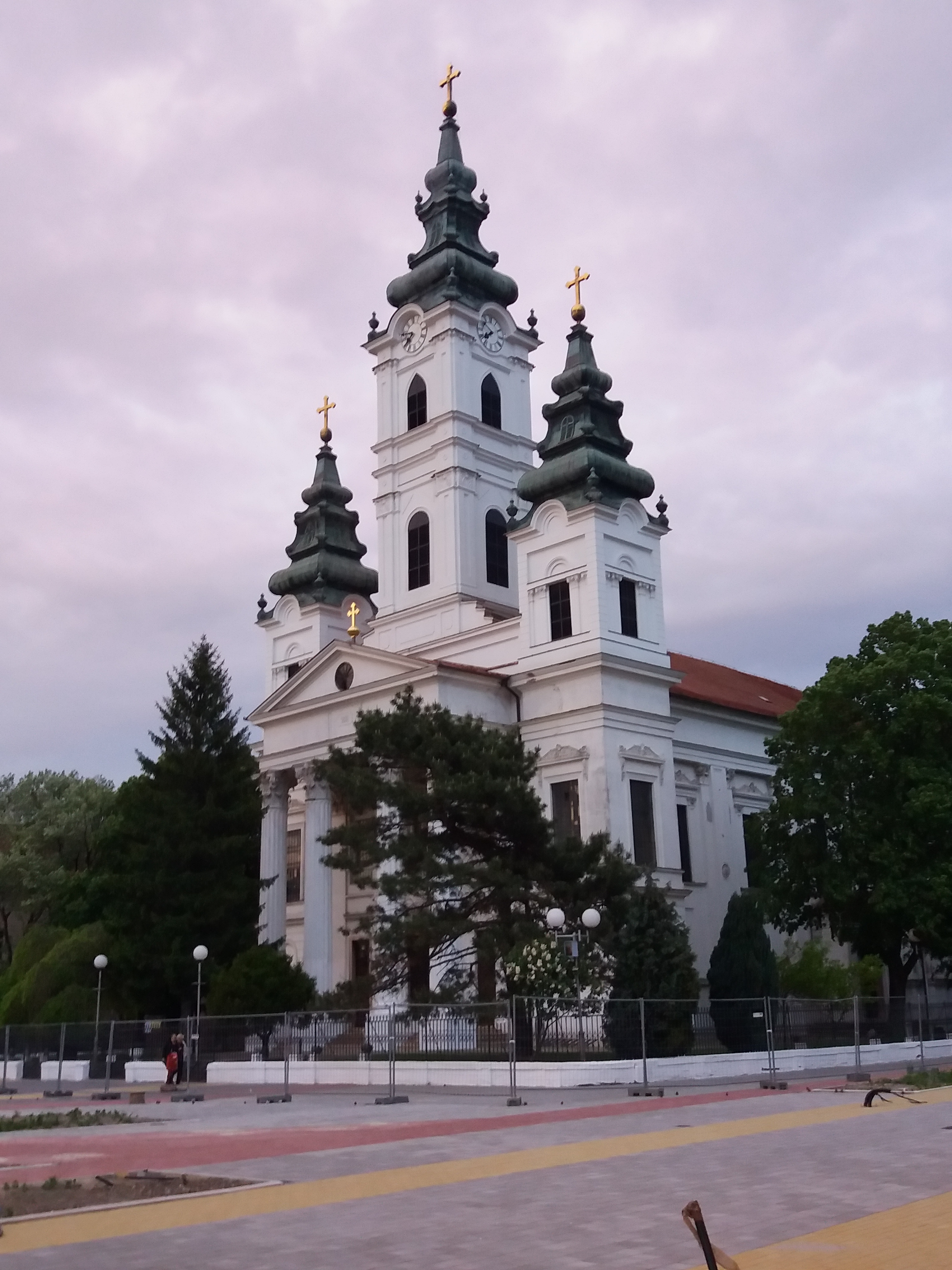
Bečej

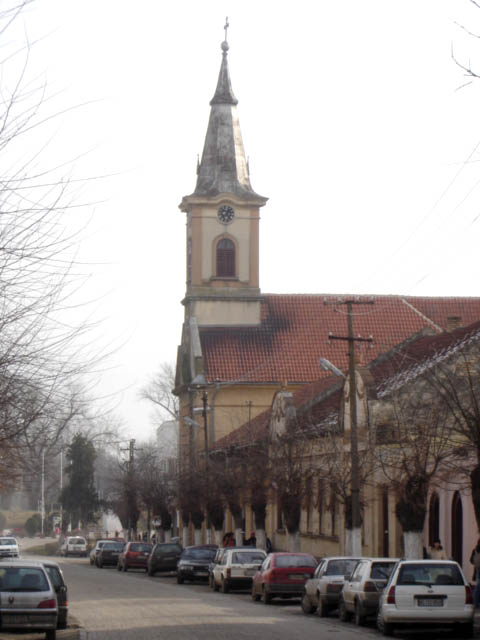
Titel

== See also ==
- District of Potisje
- List of regions of Serbia
