= Brana Vlasic =

Serbian table tennis player

Personal information
- Nationality: Serbian-American
- Born: November 5, 1990 (age 35) Novi Knezevac, Vojvodina, SR Serbia, Yugoslavia

Sport
- Sport: Table tennis
- Club: SDTTA
- Playing style: Handshake
- Highest ranking: 2417
- Current ranking: 2248

Branislava "Brana" Vlasic (Serbian Cyrillic: Бранислава "Брана" Влашић) (born 5 November 1990) is a Serbian-American table tennis player.

== Early life ==
Brana started playing at age 6 in Serbia. At 13, she relocated to San Diego. From 2007, Brana was trained by the 1971 Table Tennis World Champion, Stellan Bengtsson. Throughout her junior career, Brana was one of the highest ranked US players.

== Career ==
While pursuing her political science degree at the University of California, San Diego, she played for the University's table tennis team. The National Collegiate Table Tennis Association awarded her Female Athlete of 2013.

Brana is a longtime member of the San Diego Table Tennis Association - or SDTTA. She has worked to promote awareness of table tennis in the US among children and adults.
