= Siget =

Siget refers to:

- Siget, Hungary, the Croatian name of Szigetvár, a town in Baranya
- Siget, Zagreb, a neighbourhood of Novi Zagreb – zapad, Croatia
- Siget, Novi Kneževac, a village in northern Banat, Serbia
- Siget (Hasidic dynasty), a Hasidic dynasty originating from Sighetu Marmației
- Sighetu Marmației (until 1960 Sighet), a city in northwestern Romania
