= Čikerija =

Čikerija may refer to:

- Csikéria, village in southeastern Hungary
- Radičević, village in autonomous province of Vojvodina, northern Serbia
