= Firić =

Firić may refer to:

- Filić, Serbia, a village near Novi Kneževac
- Firić, a South Slavic surname found in Croatia and Bosnia
  - Gordan Firić, Bosnian basketball player, played for and coached the Bosnia and Herzegovina men's national basketball team
  - Valter Firić, Croatian art historian
