= Vesna Krišanov =

Serbian politician

Vesna Krišanov (Serbian Cyrillic: Весна Кришанов; born 16 August 1987) is a politician in Serbia. She has served in the National Assembly of Serbia since 2020 as a member of the Serbian Progressive Party.

== Early life and career ==
Krišanov was born in Novi Kneževac, Vojvodina, in what was then the Socialist Republic of Serbia in the Socialist Federal Republic of Yugoslavia. She holds a master's degree as an environmental protection engineer from the University of Novi Sad (2011). She returned to Novi Kneževac after her graduation, initially working for the paper and packaging company Lepenka and the waste management company Ekopak sistem, and subsequently becoming director of the public company Oktobar. In 2019, she oversaw the replacement of the municipality's old asbestos water utility pipes with newer models.

== Politician ==
Krišanov received the 157th position on the Progressive Party's Aleksandar Vučić — For Our Children electoral list in the 2020 Serbian parliamentary election and was elected to the national assembly when the list won a landslide majority with 188 out of 250 mandates. She is now a member of the environmental protection committee and the committee on labour, social issues, social inclusion, and poverty reduction; a deputy member of the health and family committee and the committee on the judiciary, public administration, and local self-government; the leader of Serbia's parliamentary friendship group with Latvia; and a member of the parliamentary friendship groups with China, Greece, Israel, Japan, Russia, Spain, and Turkey.
