= Pomorišje =

Historical region

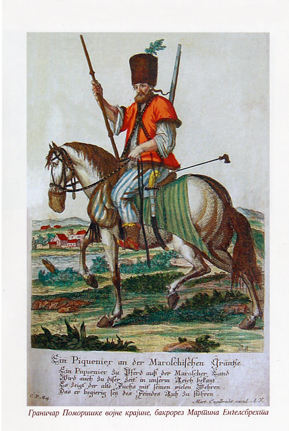
Frontiersman from Pomorišje, first half of the 18th century.

Pomorišje (Serbian Cyrillic: Поморишје) is a historical geographical region on the banks of the river Mureș (Serbian: Moriš / Мориш) that in the past has had a sizable ethnic Serb population. The region is mostly divided between Romania and Hungary, with small part of it in northern Serbia. Today, a Serb minority is present in parts of the region that are part of Romania and Hungary.

== Geography ==
Pomorišje does not have exactly defined geographical borders and term generally defines areas near the river Mureș. Different definitions would provide different views of how far from the Mureș Pomorišje might extend. Sometimes, term could refer to areas on both banks of the Mureș (including northern parts of Banat along the southern bank of Mureș and southern parts of Crișana along the northern bank of Mureș), while sometimes it can historically define only the northern bank of the Mureș, therefore, excluding areas that are parts of the Banat.

The region is mostly situated in what is now Arad County of Romania, and the smaller parts of it are situated in the Timiș County of Romania and Csongrád County of Hungary. In its wider meaning, it also include Szeged (in the Csongrád County of Hungary) and Novi Kneževac (in the North Banat District of Serbia), although these areas are rather seen as part of Potisje instead of Pomorišje.

== Name ==
The name Pomorišje means "a land near the river Mureș" in Serbian. Similar names such as Potisje, Podunavlje, Posavina, etc. are used in Serbian as a designation for areas near rivers (Tisa, Danube and Sava, respectively).

Today, most of this region is not home to a significant ethnic Serb population, thus the name Pomorišje is rarely used; however, the Serb communities still inhabit both the Hungarian and Romanian part of Pomorišje, as well as the wider area of Pomorišje that includes Novi Kneževac municipality in Serbia (nevertheless, since the latter municipality is currently not directly connected to the Mureș river, inhabitants of this area are generally viewed as living in Potisje — that is, near the river Tisa; Novi Kneževac municipality was connected to the Mureș before 1919-1920, when current state borders were defined). In the Hungarian part of Pomorišje, relatively large Serb communities live in the villages of Deszk, Szőreg, etc.

== History ==
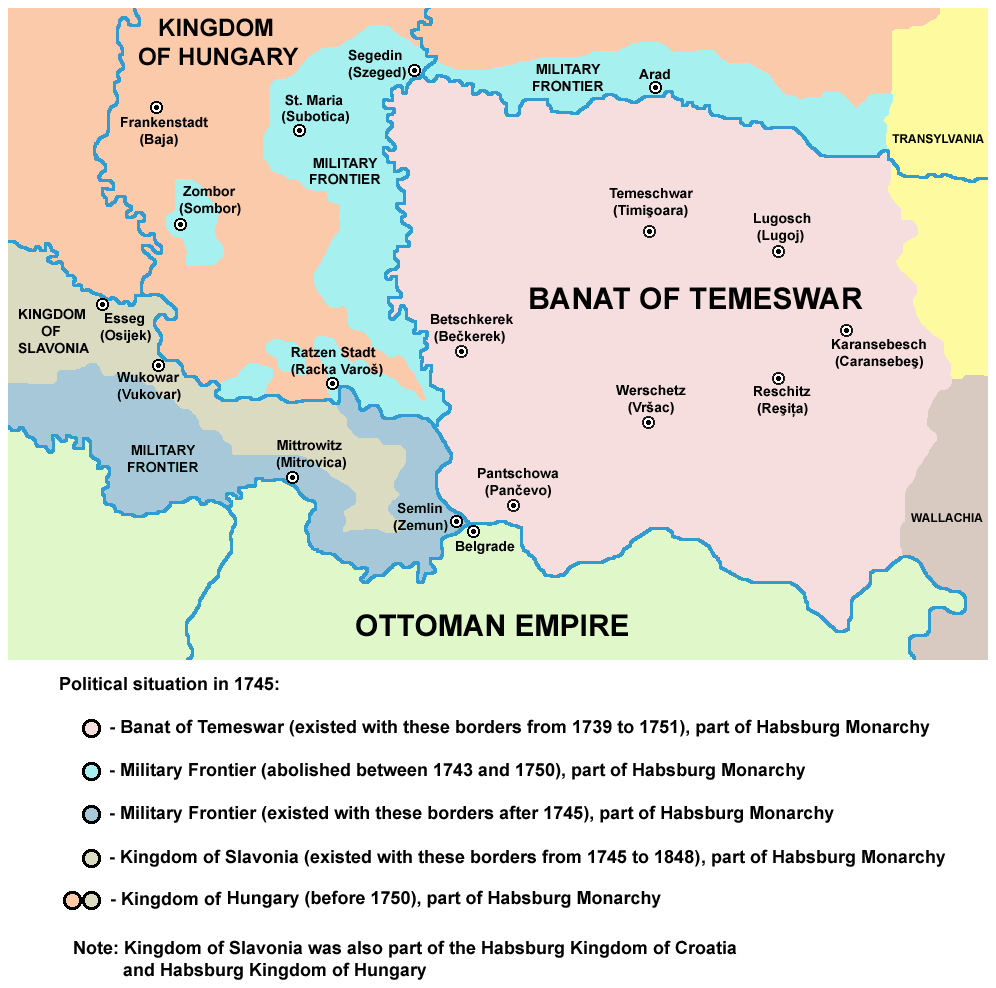
Military Frontier in Pomorišje in 1745

Historically, the population of Pomorišje was mostly composed of Hungarians, Serbs and Romanians. A large Serb population in this region had existed since the 16th century, excluding the mountains south of Lipova where "Rascians" are shown to have been living in the 15th. During the Ottoman rule (16th-17th century), the region belonged to the Province of Temeşvar.

After the Treaty of Karlowitz (1699), northern Pomorišje belonged to the Habsburg monarchy, and, between 1702 and 1751, it was part of the Tisa-Mureș (Potisje-Pomorišje) section of the Habsburg Military Frontier. During this period, the Serb population in the region was still significant. In 1720, the population of Arad, the main city of the region, numbered 177 Romanian, 162 Serbian, and 35 Hungarian families. Other important cities in Pomorišje were Lipova, Pecica, Nădlac, Makó, and Szeged. Roughly, the area between Szeged and Arad was mainly populated by Serbs, while area in the east of Arad mainly by Romanians. In 1720, the population of Szeged numbered 193 houses, of which 99 were Serbian. Remainder of Pomorišje was passed from Ottomans to Austrians after Treaty of Passarowitz in 1718.

After the Tisa-Mureș section of the Military Frontier was abolished, many Serbs from Pomorišje and Potisje left these regions and immigrated to the Russian Empire (notably to New Serbia and Slavo-Serbia) in 1752. The main leaders of this migration were Jovan Albanez and Jovan Šević. In their place, Hungarians, Swabians, Slovaks and Romanians settled in the region. According to the 1910 census in Austria-Hungary, the population of Pomorišje (roughly including municipalities connected to the Mureș river, together with Szeged and Novi Kneževac) was 670,726 people, of whom 33,355 were ethnic Serbs. The southern part of Pomorišje (including the municipalities of northern Banat, together with Novi Kneževac) had a population of 245,276 people, of whom 29,175 were ethnic Serbs, while the northern part (including Szeged) had a population of 425,450 people, of whom 4,180 were ethnic Serbs.

== See also ==
- Serbs in Romania
- Serbs in Hungary
