= Aleksandar Maćašev =

Serbian artist and designer

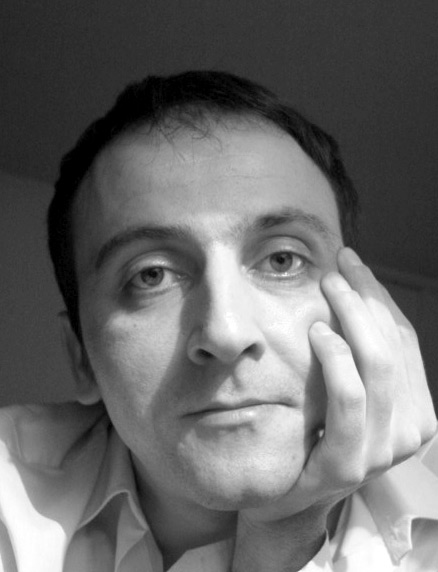
Aleksandar Maćašev, 2003

Joseph Goebbels (TM) logo

Aleksandar Maćašev (pronounced [matɕaʃeʋ]), born in 1971, is a Serbian artist and designer known for his controversial Joseph Goebbels (TM) project in which Joseph Goebbels was depicted as the father of contemporary media culture.

== Biography ==
Maćašev was born in the town of Bečej in former Yugoslavia, on August 3, 1971. Upon graduation from high school of mathematics in Bečej, he completed his mandatory military service and was discharged on the eve of the outbreak of Yugoslav wars. He moved to Belgrade in 1991 to attend the Faculty of Architecture, University of Belgrade, and graduated in 1998. He was one of a handful of young artists selected to be exhibited in the “Conversation” exhibition at the Museum of Contemporary Arts in Belgrade. Beginning in 2001 he worked for various advertising agencies in Belgrade: New Moment (former Saatchi and Saatchi), BBDO Ovation, Pristop and Mass Vision. He conceived the first course in web design in Serbia for BK Academy of Arts where he taught from 2004 to 2006. He has worked as a freelance artist and designer since 2004. He currently resides in New York City.

== Work ==
Maćašev is best known for the use of advertising and mass media vocabulary in his work, as well as for his elusive professional identity, which fluctuates between applied and fine arts. "His graphic work is challenging, political and often uncomfortable." He targets issues like mass-media culture, religious bigotry, political hypocrisy and making private issues public. Maćašev's work has been featured and written about in design publications from throughout the world.

== Joseph Goebbels (TM) ==
In 2005, Maćašev created an art project in the form of an advertising campaign in Belgrade, Joseph Goebbels (TM). The campaign featured billboards, posters, radio, and television spots featuring mosaic images of Nazi Minister of Propaganda Joseph Goebbels that are created using the icons of major media companies. The main message was that Joseph Goebbels is a father of contemporary media culture and mass-communication. This artwork was derived from his previous web art piece “Unstable portrait of Joseph Goebbels”. The project has garnered plenty of attention throughout the world.
