= Mileševo (Bečej) =

Mileševo Милешево (Serbian) Drea (Hungarian)
- Village (Selo)
- Location within Vojvodina Location within Serbia Location within Europe
- Coordinates: 45°44′N 19°49′E
- Country: Serbia
- Province: Vojvodina
- Region: Bačka (Podunavlje)
- District: South Bačka
- Municipality: Bečej

Population (2002)
  - Total: 1,118
- Time zone: UTC+1 (CET)
  - Summer (DST): UTC+2 (CEST)

Mileševo (Serbian Cyrillic: Милешево, Hungarian: Kutaspuszta and Drea) is a village in Serbia. It is situated in the Bečej municipality, South Bačka District, Vojvodina province. The village has a Hungarian ethnic majority and its population numbering 1,118 people (2002 census).

== Ethnic groups (2002 census) ==
Population of the village include:

- 571 (51.07%) Hungarians
- 485 (43.38%) Serbs
- 19 (1.70%) Croats
- others.

== Historical population ==
- 1961: 1,908
- 1971: 1,468
- 1981: 1,301
- 1991: 1,218

== See also ==
- List of places in Serbia
- List of cities, towns and villages in Vojvodina
