= Church of St. George, Bečej =

Church of St. George
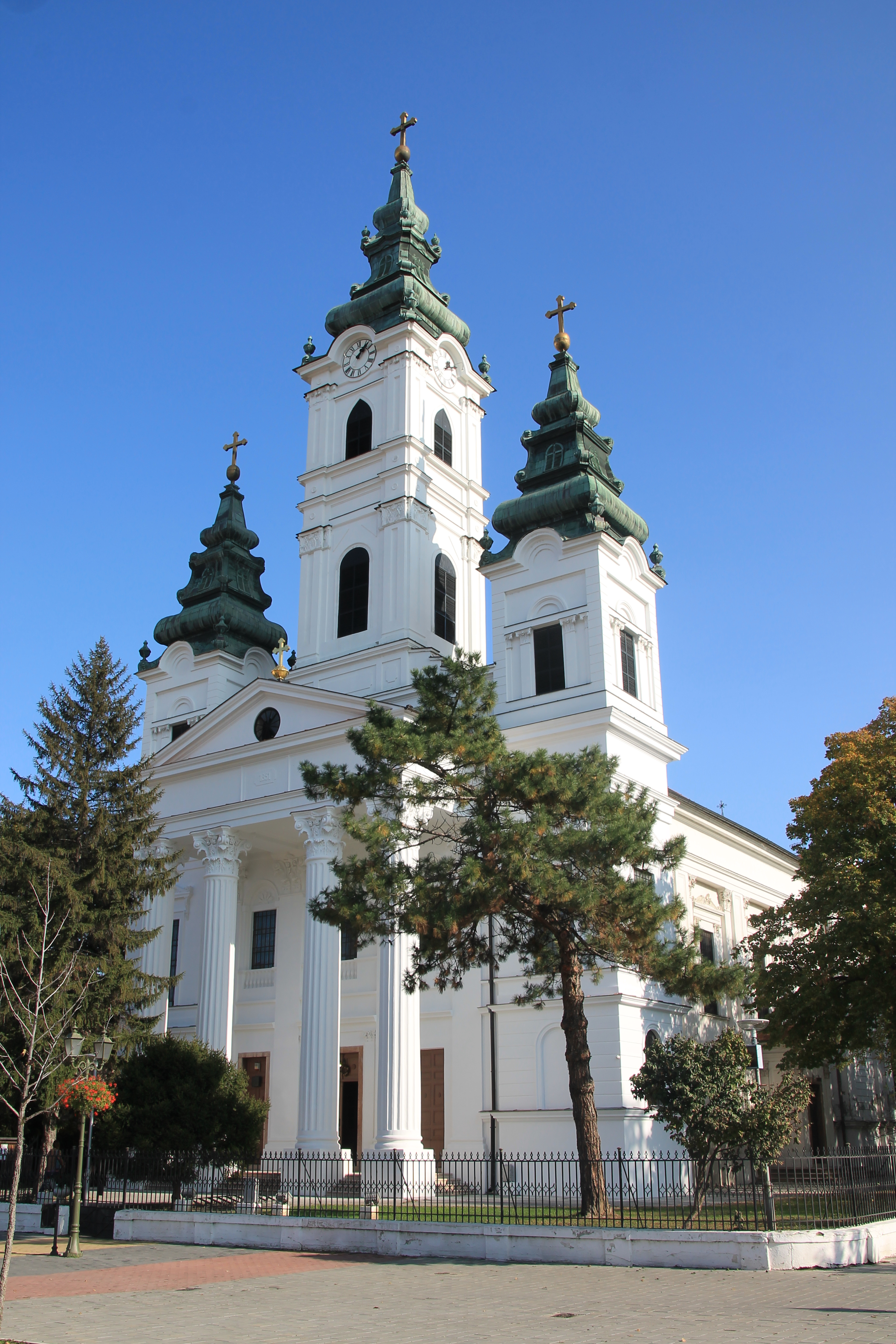
- Church of St. George
- 45.615004°N 20.049939°E
- Location: Bečej
- Country: Serbia
- Denomination: Serbian Orthodox Church

History
- Status: Church
- Founded: 1858
- Dedication: Saint George

Architecture
- Functional status: Active

Administration
- Diocese: Eparchy of Bačka

The Church of St. George (Serbian: Црква светог Ђорђа, romanized: Crkva svetog Đorđa) is а Serbian Orthodox church located in the town of Bečej, Serbia. It is one of the largest Serbian Orthodox churches in Vojvodina. The building is listed as a cultural monument of great importance. The church was built between 1851 and 1858. The earlier Serbian Orthodox church in the town was destroyed during the Hungarian Revolution of 1848. A major reconstruction of the contemporary church was carried out in 1931 involving expanding the choir, widening the north and south entrances, and constructing new staircases. In October 1944, during World War II in Yugoslavia, the central tower was damaged, and the restoration of the towers and the roof took place in 1965 and 1966.

== See also ==
- Immovable Cultural Heritage of Great Importance (Serbia)
