= District of Potisje =

District of Potisje Potiski krunski dištrikt Потиски крунски диштрикт
- district of the Habsburg monarchy
- 1751–1848
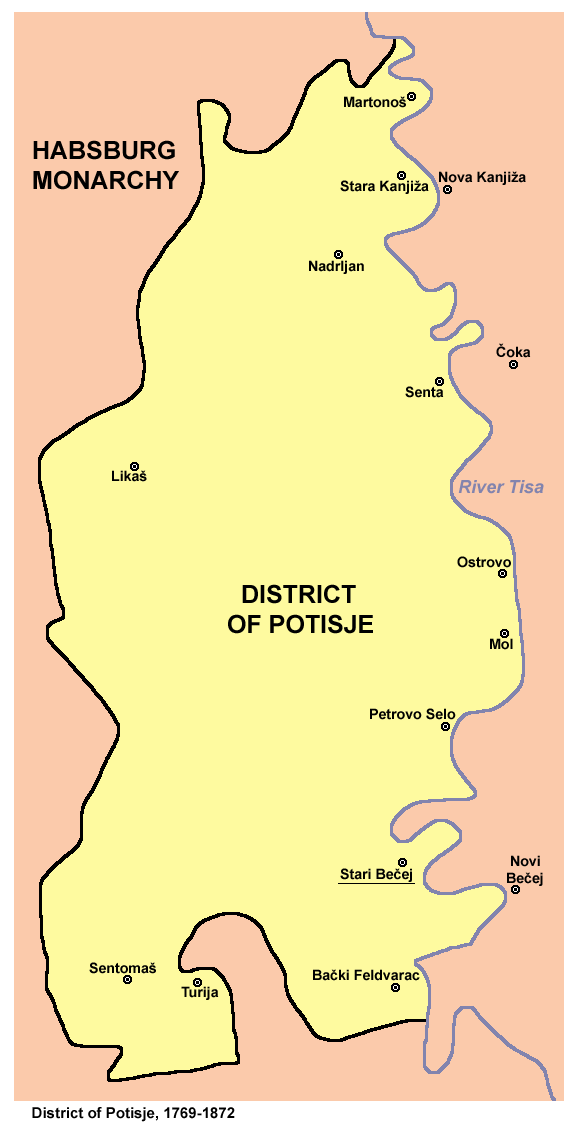
- District of Potisje (1751-1848)
- Capital: Stari Bečej (today Bečej)
- History
  - Established: 1751
  - Disestablished: 1848
Preceded by	Succeeded by
Military Frontier	Serbian Vojvodina
- Today part of: Serbia

The District of Potisje (Serbian: Potiski krunski dištrikt or Потиски крунски диштрикт) was an administrative territorial entity of the Habsburg monarchy. It was formed in 1751 with the headquarters in Stari Bečej, and existed for almost one century (until 1848).

== History ==
Before the formation of the district, its territory was part of the Tisa-Moriš section of the Military Frontier and was mainly inhabited by ethnic Serbs. After the abolishment of this part of the Frontier, many Serbs left from the area and immigrated to the Russian Empire (notably to New Serbia and Slavo-Serbia). Some of them also settled in Banat.

The three privileges were given to the district in 1759, 1774, and 1800, and were published for those frontiersmen (Serbs) that did not emigrate to the Russian Empire or Banat. The first privilege of the District defined its autonomous status, while the second one allowed ethnic Hungarians to settle in the district. Serbs opposed this settling of Hungarians in Serb settlements, and in some places, ethnic clashes between the two groups occurred. For example, the first Hungarian house built in Martonoš was demolished by Serbs. The ethnic balance in much of the area was, however, changed in favor of the Hungarians.

Administratively, the District of Potisje was part of the Batsch-Bodrog County within the Habsburg Kingdom of Hungary. After the abolishment of the district (in 1848), its territory was incorporated into the autonomous Serbian Vojvodina.

== Municipalities ==
The District included 14 municipalities:

- Ada
- Bečej
- Kanjiža
- Martonoš
- Mol
- Petrovo Selo
- Senta
- Sentomaš
- Turija
- Feldvarac
- Gospođinci
- Stari Kovilj
- Novi Kovilj
- Čurug

In 1796, the latter four municipalities were excluded from the District and included into the Military Frontier (Šajkaš Battalion).

== See also ==
- Potisje
- District of Velika Kikinda
