= Majdan (Novi Kneževac) =

Majdan Мајдан (Serbian) Magyarmajdány (Hungarian)
- Village (Selo)
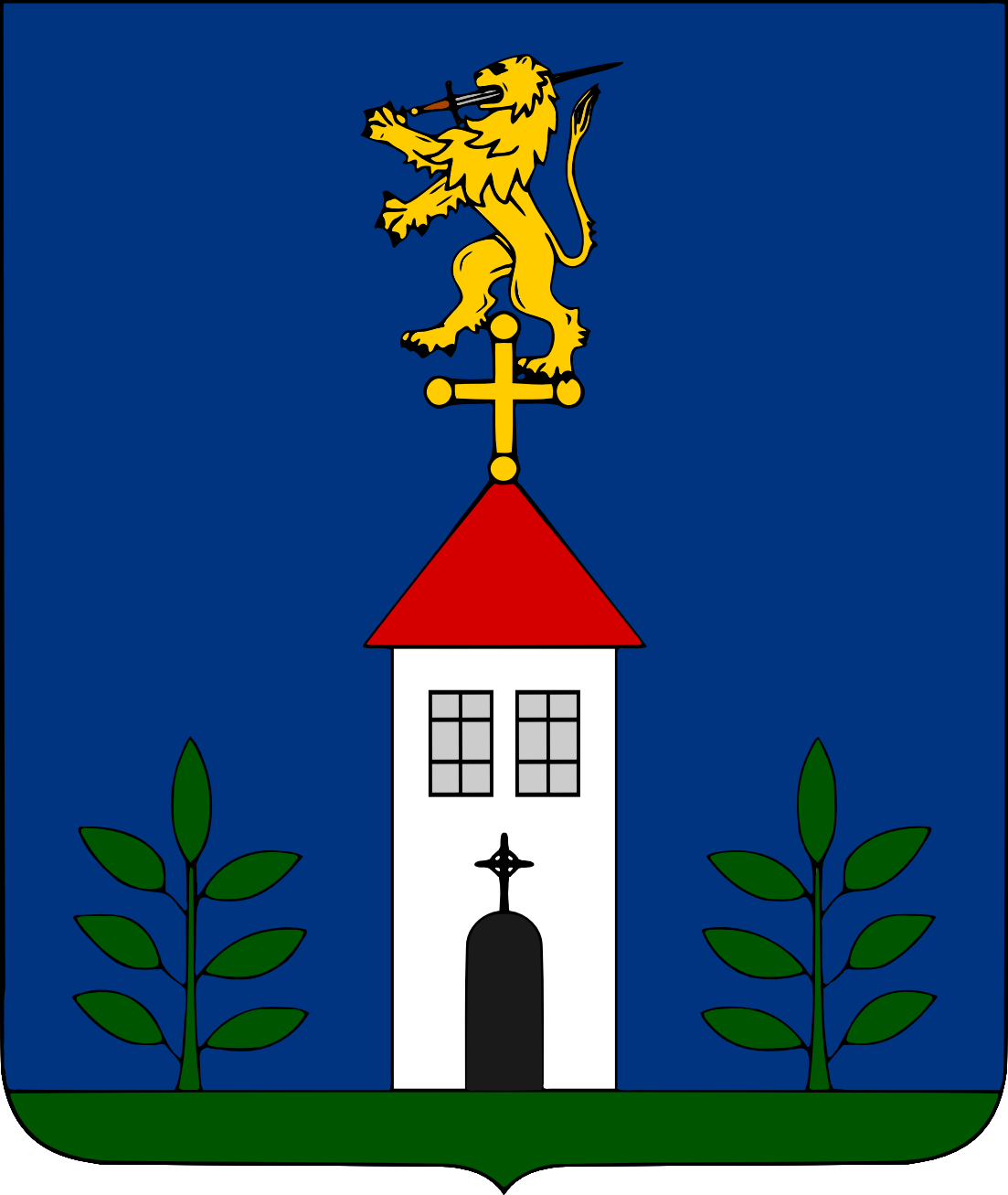
- Coat of arms

- Location of Vojvoda Zimonić within Serbia Majdan (Serbia) Majdan (Europe)
- Coordinates: 46°06′00″N 20°15′00″E
- Country: Serbia
- Province: Vojvodina
- District: North Banat
- Municipalities: Novi Kneževac
- Elevation: 80 m (260 ft)

Population (2002)
  - Majdan: 292
- Time zone: UTC+1 (CET)
  - Summer (DST): UTC+2 (CEST)
- Postal code: 23333
- Area code: +381(0)230
- Car plates: KI

Majdan (Serbian Cyrillic: Мајдан, Hungarian: Magyarmajdány) is a village in Serbia. It is situated in the Novi Kneževac municipality, in the North Banat District, Vojvodina province. The village has a Hungarian ethnic majority (85.95%) and its population numbering 292 people (2002 census).

== Name ==
"Majdan" (мајдан) is a Serbian word for quarry (Hungarian word with same meaning is "majdán"). The word "majdan" has Turkish roots like many other words that came from period of administration of the Ottoman Empire.

== See also ==
- List of places in Serbia
- List of cities, towns and villages in Vojvodina
