= Fantast =

Castle in Serbia

Coordinates: 45.6526°N 19.9020°E

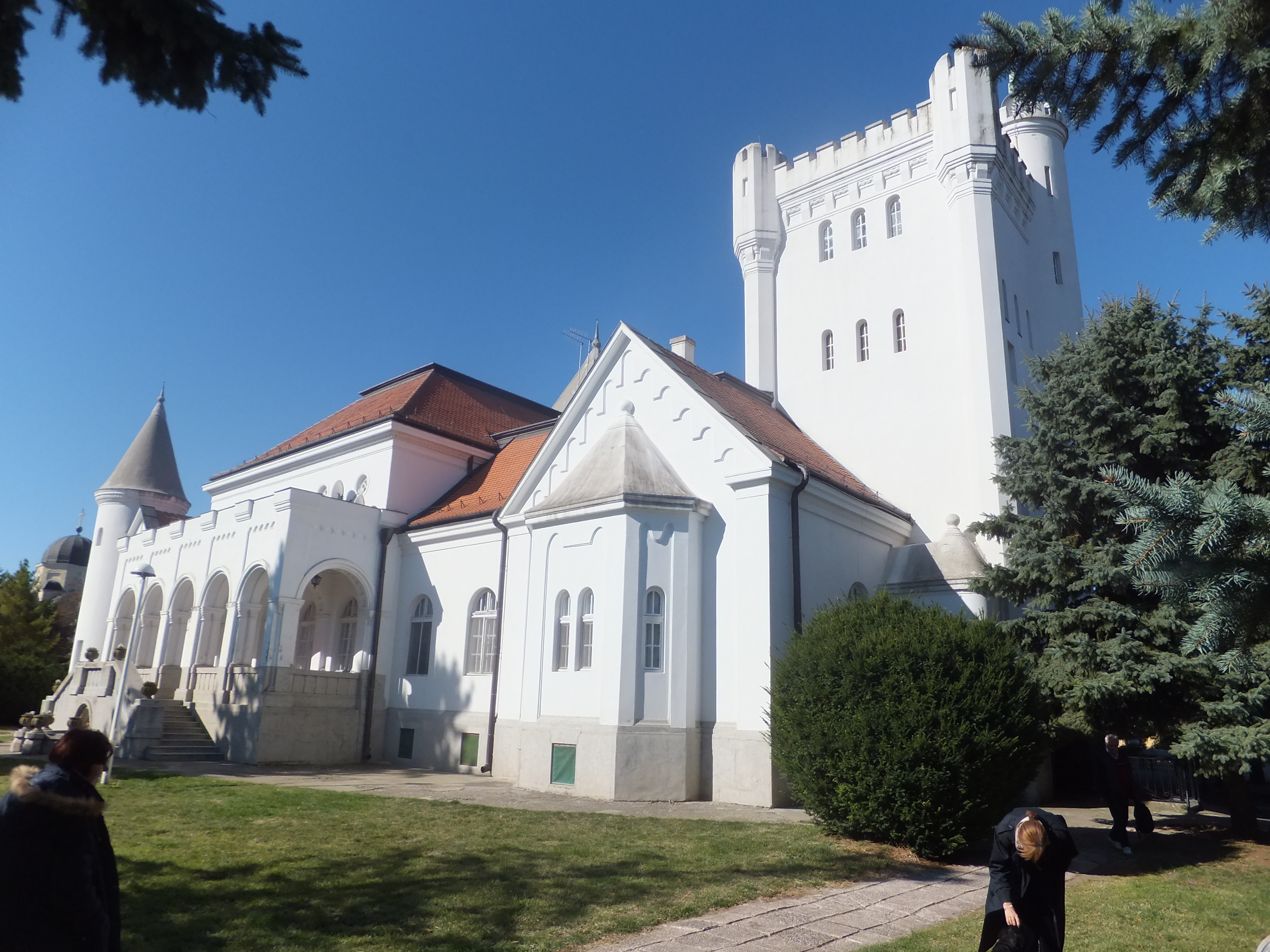
Fantast Castle

Fantast Castle (Serbian: Фантаст/Fantast), also known as Dunđerski Palace (Serbian: Дворац Дунђерски/Dvorac Dunđerski), is a Serbian castle built by Bogdan Dunđerski from 1919 onwards. Dundjerski family originally came from Herzegovina to Vojvodina (Serbia) in the late nineteenth century and at one point he owned 1500 hectares of land.

The castle became one of the most famous castles in the Austro-Hungarian monarchy. It was heavily bombed in 1945, and subsequently seized by the government of SFR Yugoslavia, who proclaimed it as state wealth. Most of the original furnishings were removed, and today only 65 hectares of the surrounding land remain part of the castle's grounds.

It is said that Bogdan Dunđerski built the lavish castle and lands to prove to all that he was not bankrupt as had been rumored. He never married but it was known that he had a great fondness for fine women, horses and wine.

== Today ==
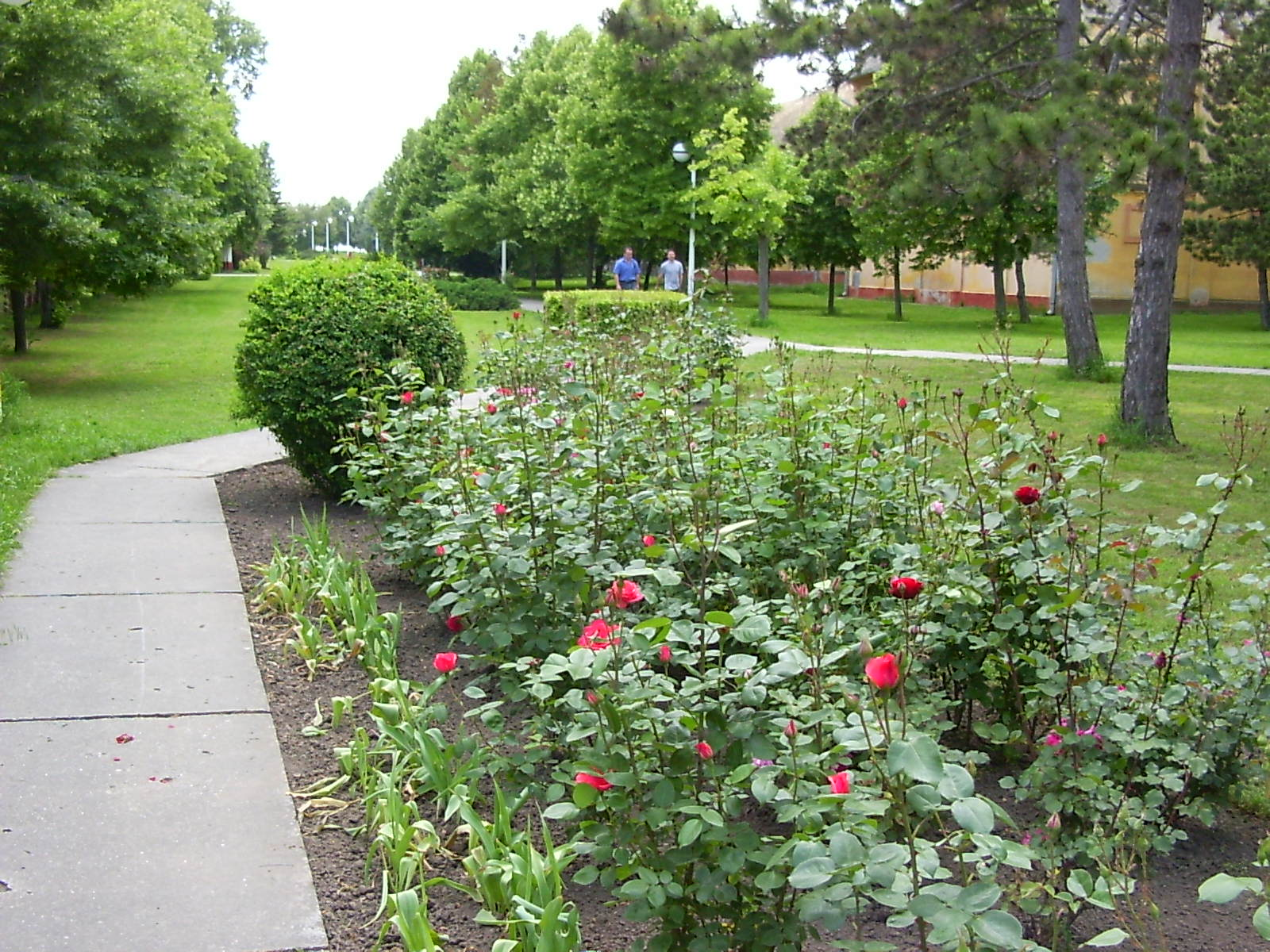
The castle's park

The castle lies 12 km from the town of Bečej and about 60 km from Novi Sad and today it is used as a tourist destination, where it serves as a hotel with restaurant. Tourists are free to enter and explore the castle's large park and the mausoleum where former owners are buried as well as play on the tennis courts and use the runway for small airplanes.

A fully functioning horse stable and farm still exists, it was famed for producing some of the best thoroughbreds in the lands, once numbering 1400.

There is also the Church of St George, inside of which is a painting of the Virgin Mary by the artist Uroš Predić, however it is said that the face was changed to that of Mara Dinjacki (the blacksmith's wife), whom Dunđerski was in love with. There is also a small ostrich farm to visit and guided tours around the castle and lands are 1 euro per person.

== Gallery ==
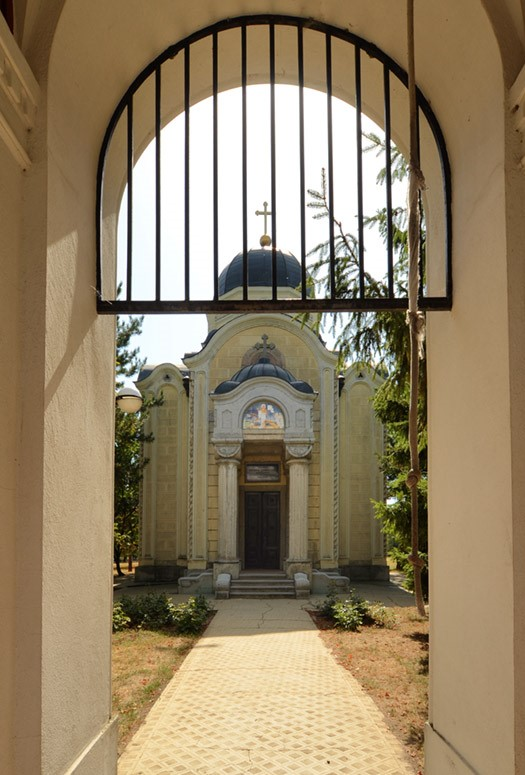
Chapel in complex of Fantast Castle in Bečej

== See also ==
- Tourism in Serbia
