= Podlokanj =

Podlokanj Подлокањ (Serbian)
- Village (Selo)
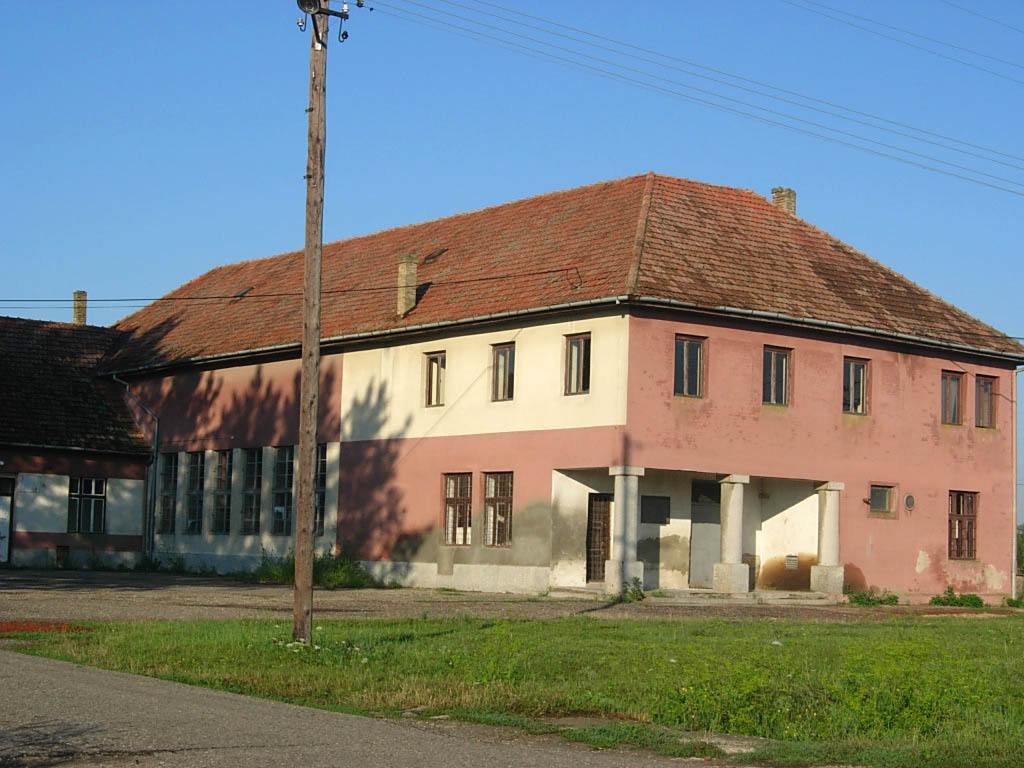
- Center of the village

- Location of Vojvoda Zimonić within Serbia Podlokanj (Serbia) Podlokanj (Europe)
- Coordinates: 46°01′10″N 20°16′12″E
- Country: Serbia
- Province: Vojvodina
- District: North Banat
- Municipalities: Novi Kneževac
- Elevation: 72 m (236 ft)

Population (2002)
  - Podlokanj: 217
- Time zone: UTC+1 (CET)
  - Summer (DST): UTC+2 (CEST)
- Area code: +381(0)230
- Car plates: KI

Podlokanj (Serbian Cyrillic: Подлокањ) is a village in Serbia. It is situated in the Novi Kneževac municipality, in the North Banat District, Vojvodina province. The village has a Serb ethnic majority (97.23%) and its population numbering 217 people (2002 census).

== Historical population ==
- 1961: 457
- 1971: 331
- 1981: 274
- 1991: 172

== See also ==
- List of places in Serbia
- List of cities, towns and villages in Vojvodina
