= Radičević =

Radičević Радичевић (Serbian)
- Village (Selo)
- Location within Vojvodina Location within Serbia Location within Europe
- Coordinates: 45°34′55″N 19°55′00″E
- Country: Serbia
- Province: Vojvodina
- Region: Bačka (Podunavlje)
- District: South Bačka
- Municipality: Bečej

Population (2002)
  - Total: 1,332
- Time zone: UTC+1 (CET)
  - Summer (DST): UTC+2 (CEST)

Radičević (Serbian Cyrillic: Радичевић) is a village in Serbia. It is situated in the Bečej municipality, South Bačka District, Vojvodina province. The village has a Serb ethnic majority and its population numbering 1,332 people (2002 census).

== Name ==
In Serbian the village is known as Radičević (Радичевић), in Hungarian as Csikériapuszta. It is also widely known and often referred to as Čikerija (Чикерија).

== Ethnic groups (2002 census) ==
- Serbs = 1,166 (87.54%)
- Hungarians = 28 (2.10%)
- Yugoslavs = 23 (1.73%)
- Croats = 23 (1.73%)
- Montenegrins = 14 (1.05%)
- others.

== Historical population ==
- 1961: 1,198
- 1971: 1,155
- 1981: 1,117
- 1991: 1,250
- 2002: 1,332

== See also ==
- List of places in Serbia
- List of cities, towns and villages in Vojvodina
