= National Collegiate Table Tennis Association =

- Sport: Table Tennis
- Founded: 1991
- No. of teams: 155
- Country: United States; Canada
- Website: www.nctta.org

The National Collegiate Table Tennis Association (NCTTA) is a non-profit organization whose aim is to promote competitive table tennis at the collegiate level in the United States and Canada. As of 2012, 155 universities competed in 28 geographical divisions, organized into 6 different regions throughout the United States, Canada and Puerto Rico.

== Contests (Main Draw) ==
- Co-ed's Team
- Women's Team
- Divisional Meeting
- National Championship

== Co-ed's Teams Contest ==
The co-ed's team contest consists of 4 male or female players competing with opposing schools. The format works by having 4 players each play singles matches against each other. They will play all 4 games even if one team has already won 3 games. If there is a tiebreaker, there will be a doubles match to determine the winner between the two schools.

== Women's teams contest ==
The women's teams contest consists of at least 4 and a maximum of 8 female players from a university competing against another school. The format of this event is identical to Coed, except with all female players.

== Divisional Competition ==
Throughout an NCTTA season, each division holds several competitions for its member schools during the Fall and Spring. All the member schools in a division play each other at least twice during a season. The champion from each division advances to the National Championship along with several wild card (at-large) selections based on team performance. NCTTA divisions include:

- Upstate New York Central
- Upstate New York Western
- New England
- Mid Atlantic
- Carolina
- Midwest
- Northwest
- New York City
- Texas
- Georgia
- Florida
- Northern California
- Southern California
- Ohio
- Virginia
- Dixie
- Kansas
- Minnesota

== National Championship ==
Around April of each year, the divisional champions from the divisional tournaments compete with each other for the National Championships. This event is held in conjunction to the National Collegiate Singles, and doubles event sponsored by Association of College Unions International (ACUI) until 2012. The eight events include Men's Team, Women's Team, Men's Singles, Women's Singles, Paralympic Singles, Men's Doubles, Women's Doubles. Cancelled events include Mixed Doubles, which was cancelled for 2012.

== Media ==
The NCTTA has a bimonthly article published in the USATT magazine. The National Collegiate Championships and NCTTA membered schools have been featured on ESPN, Sports Illustrated.

Previous national Champions include:

- New York University
- Texas Wesleyan University
- University of Illinois at Urbana-Champaign
- Johns Hopkins University

== Sponsorship ==
- Coca-Cola
- Newgy Industries
- Butterfly (table tennis equipment manufacturer)
- Double Fish
