= Bečej =

Bečej Бечеј (Serbian) Óbecse (Hungarian)
- Town and municipality
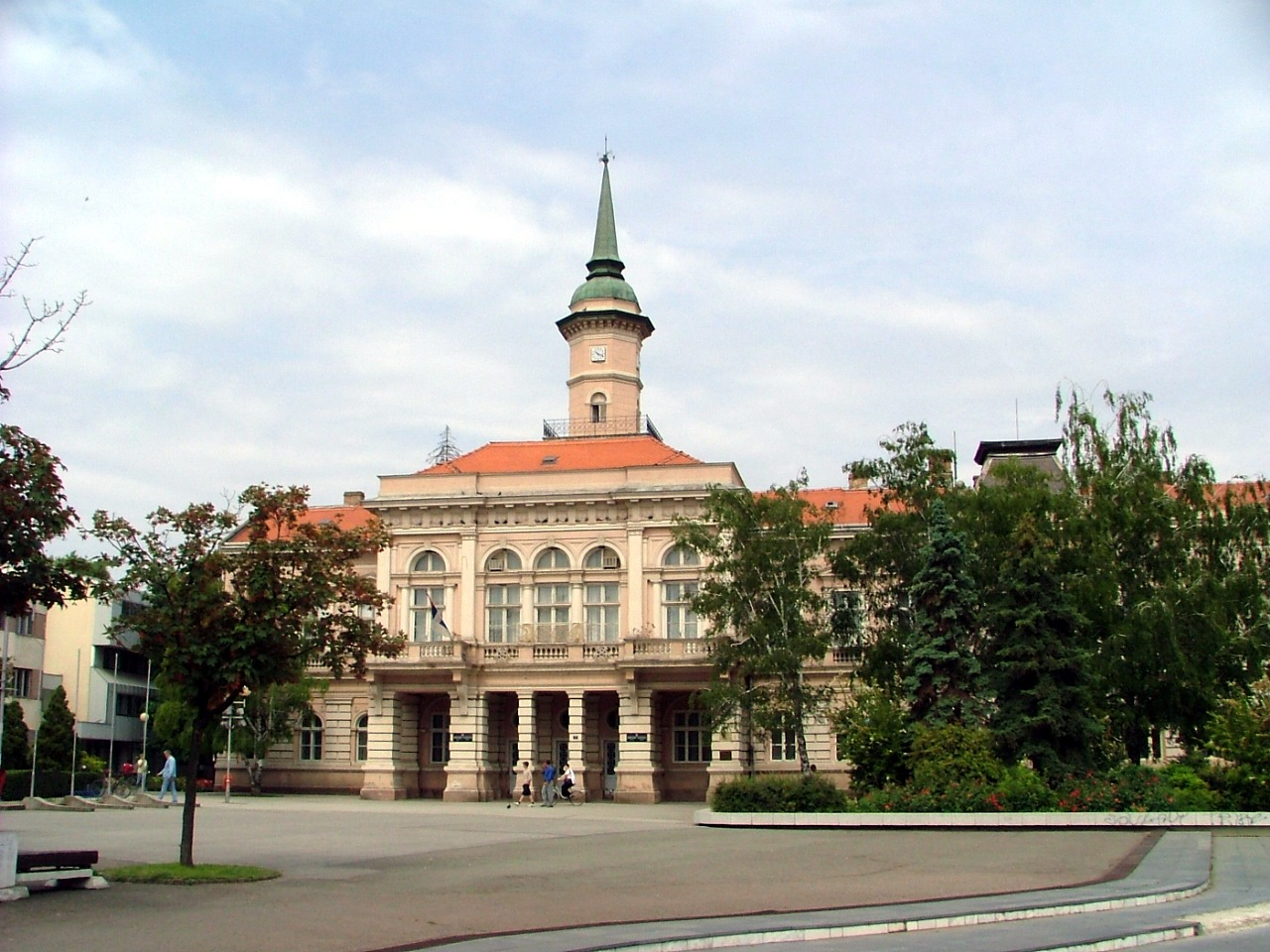
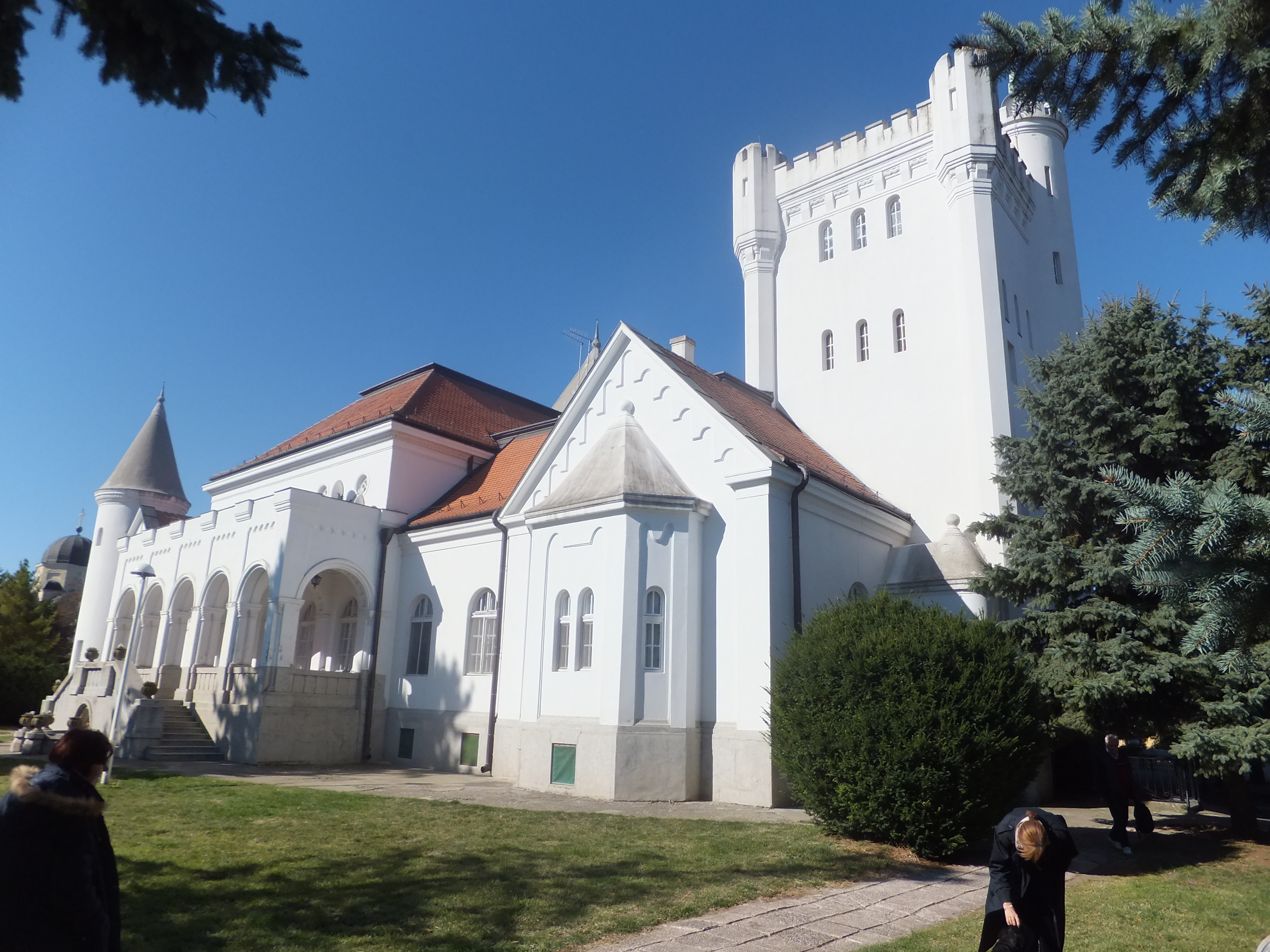
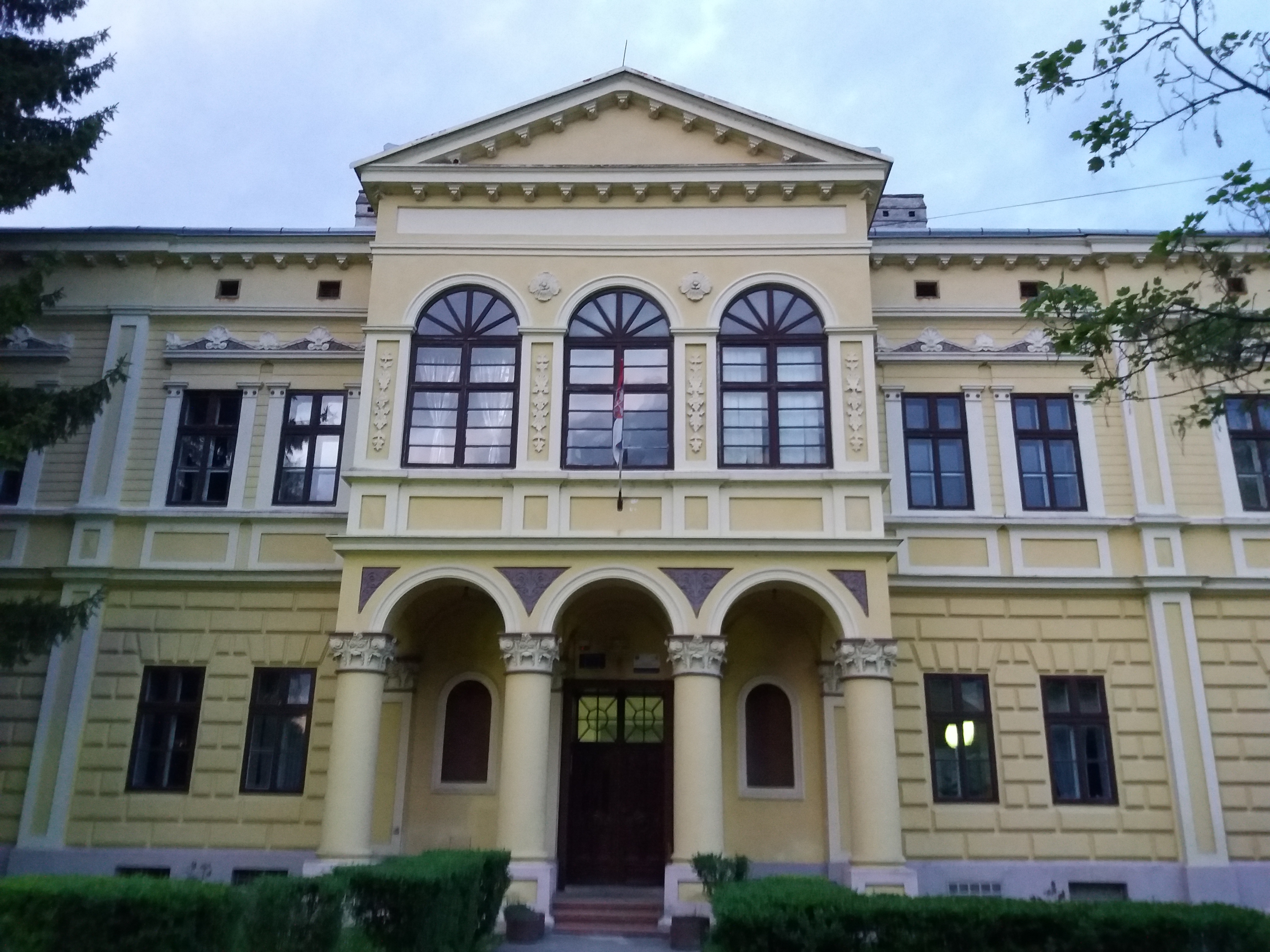
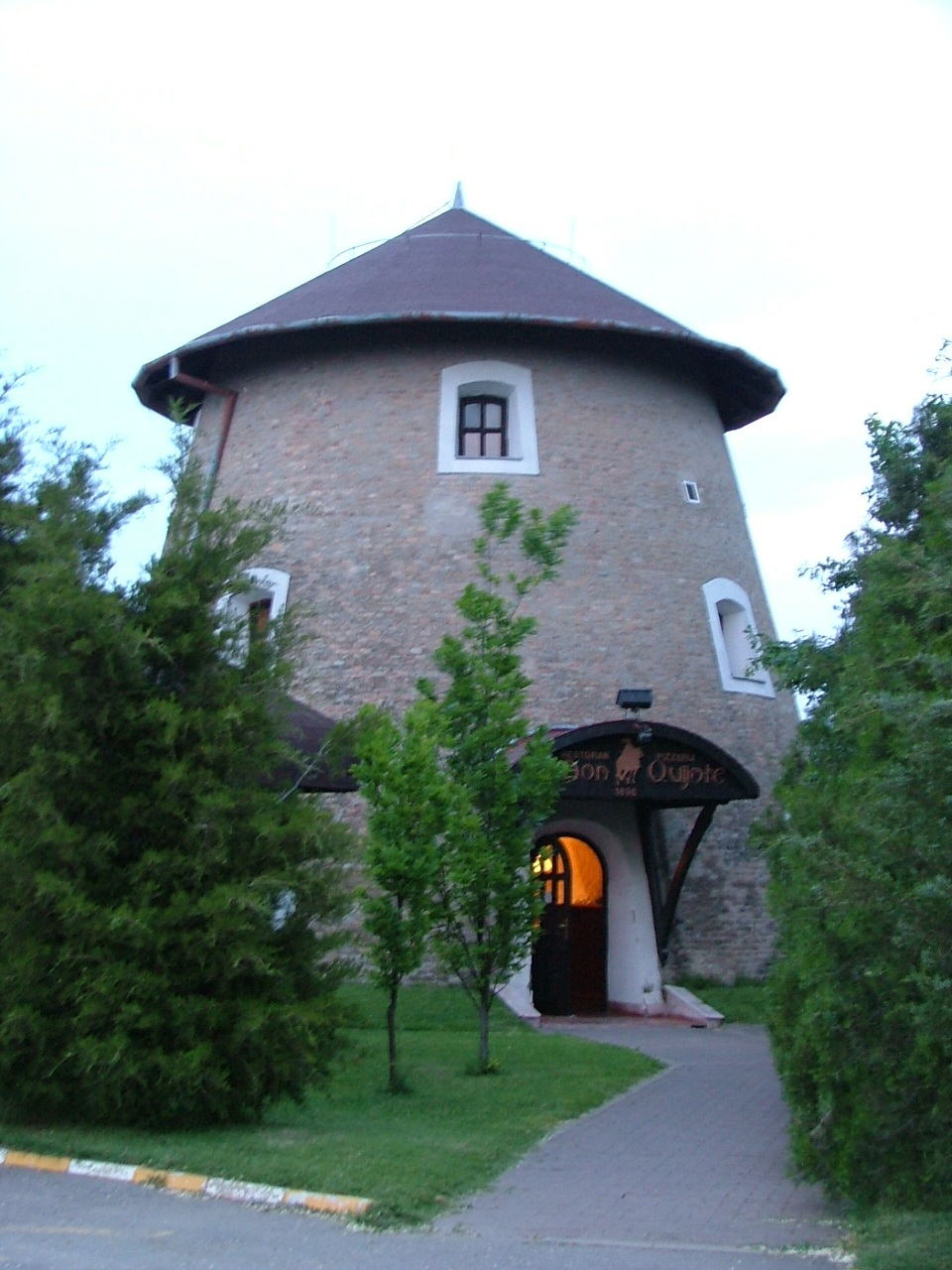
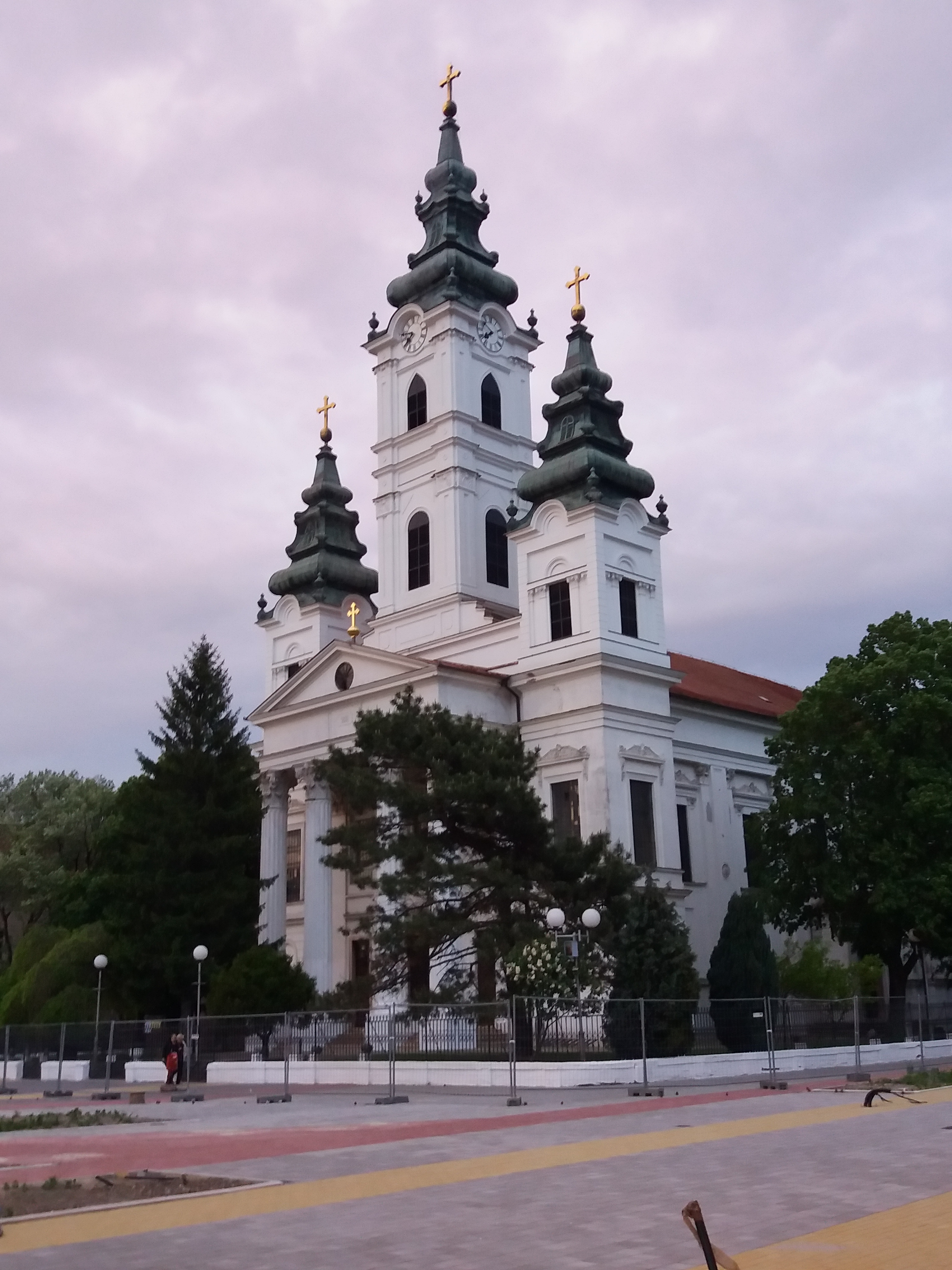
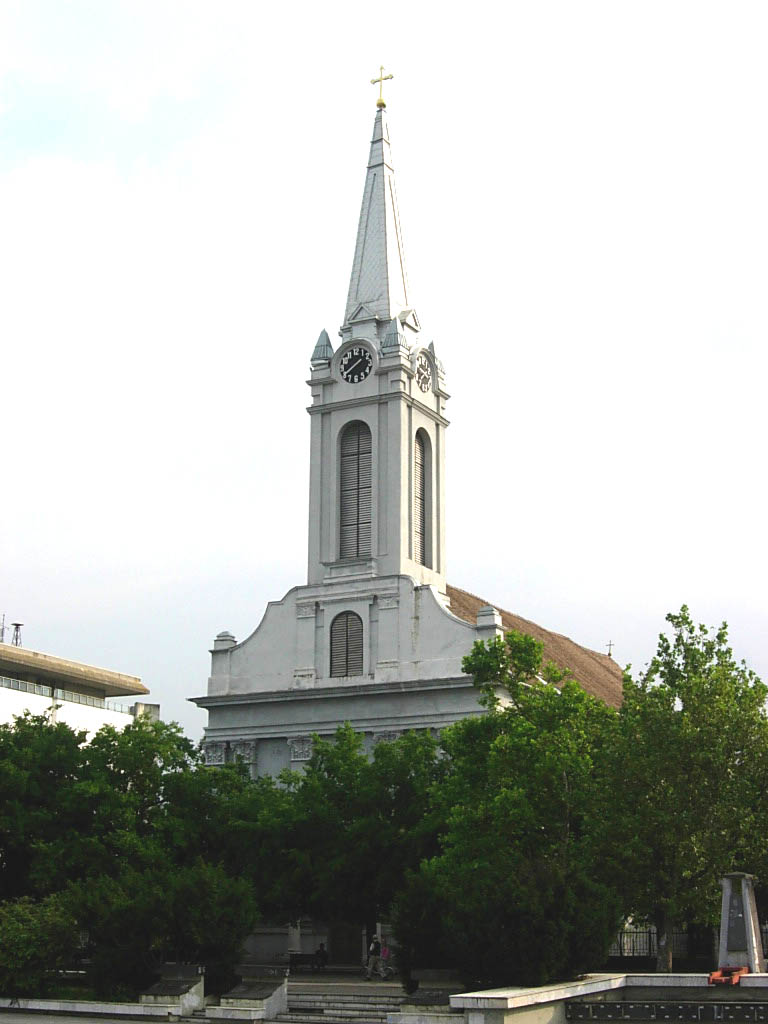
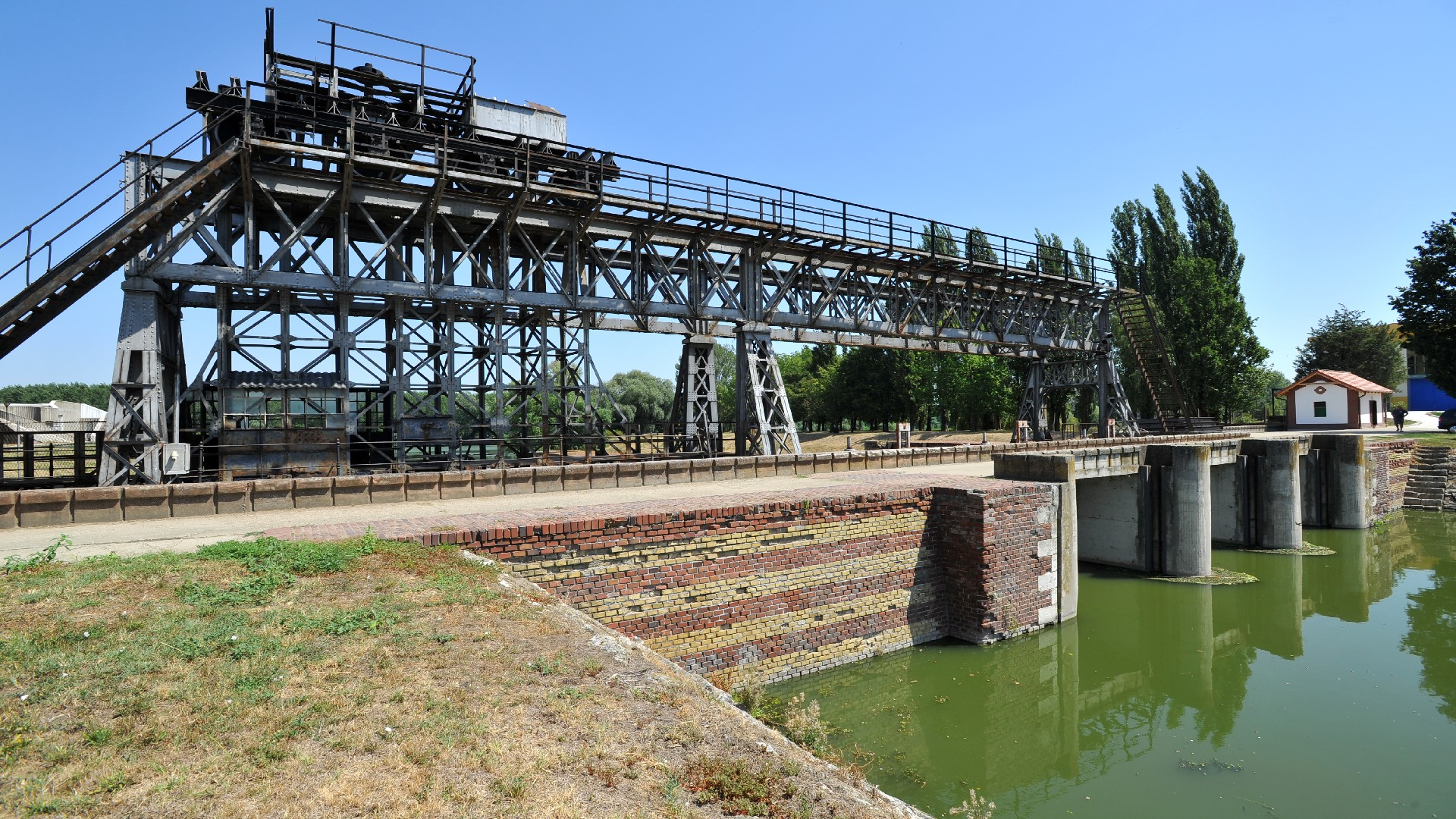
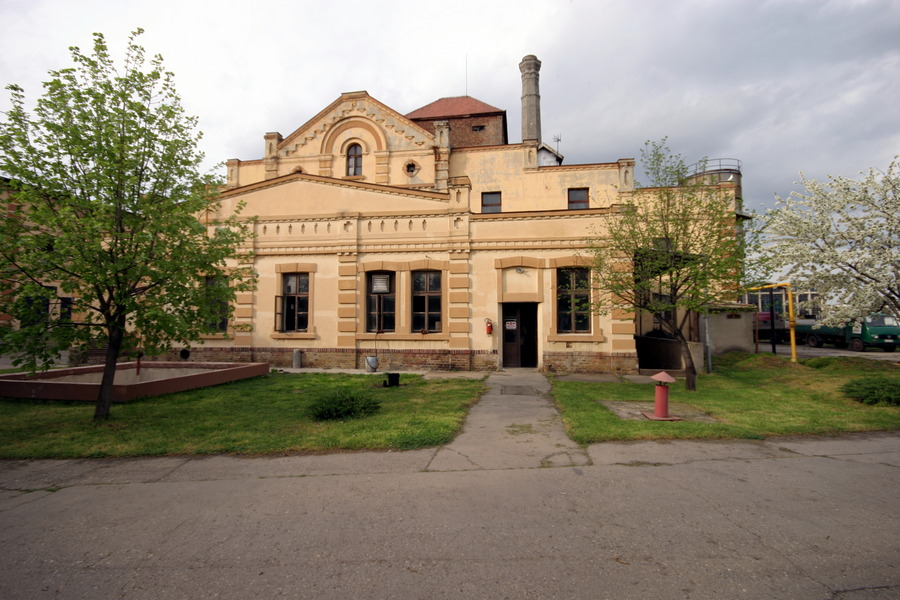
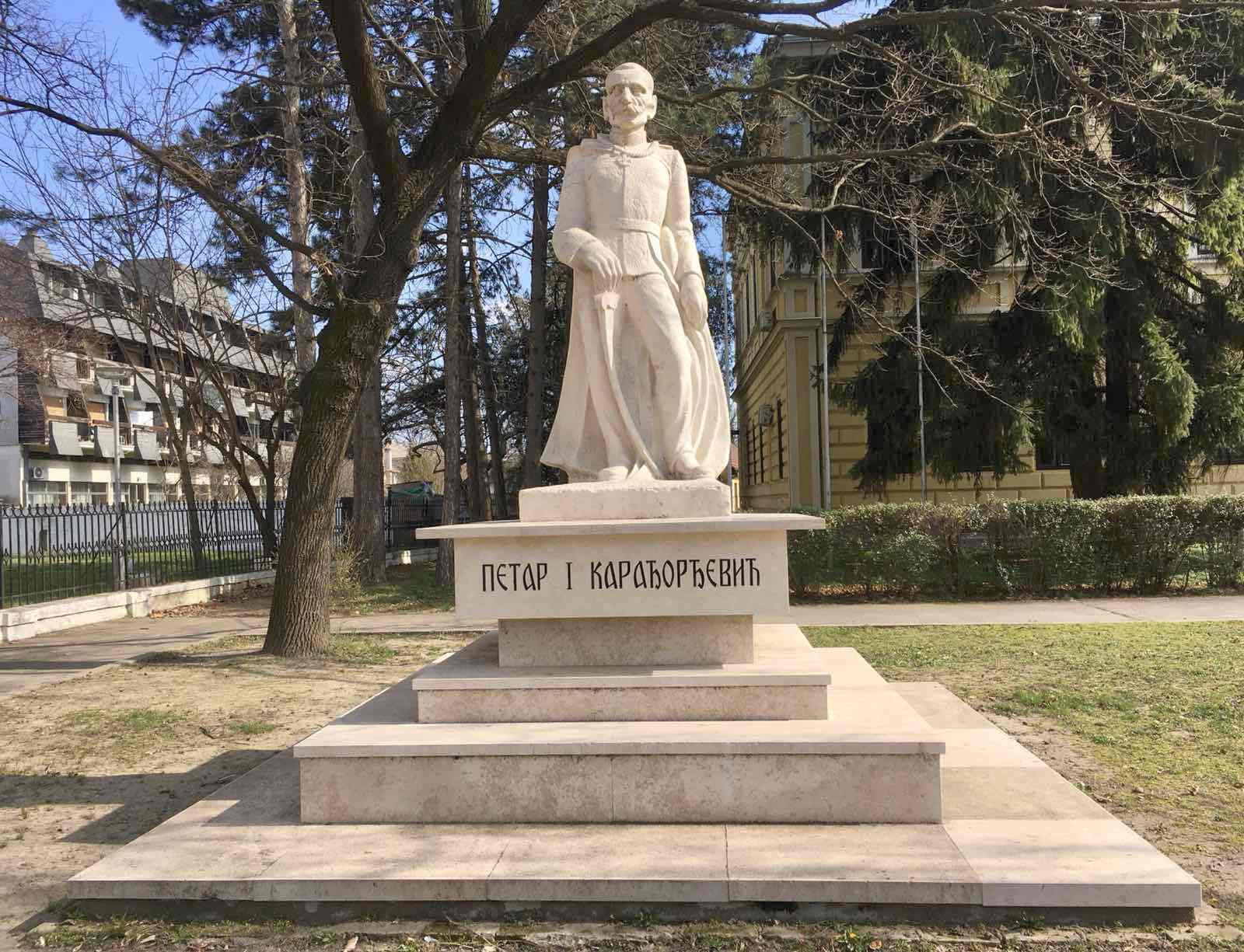
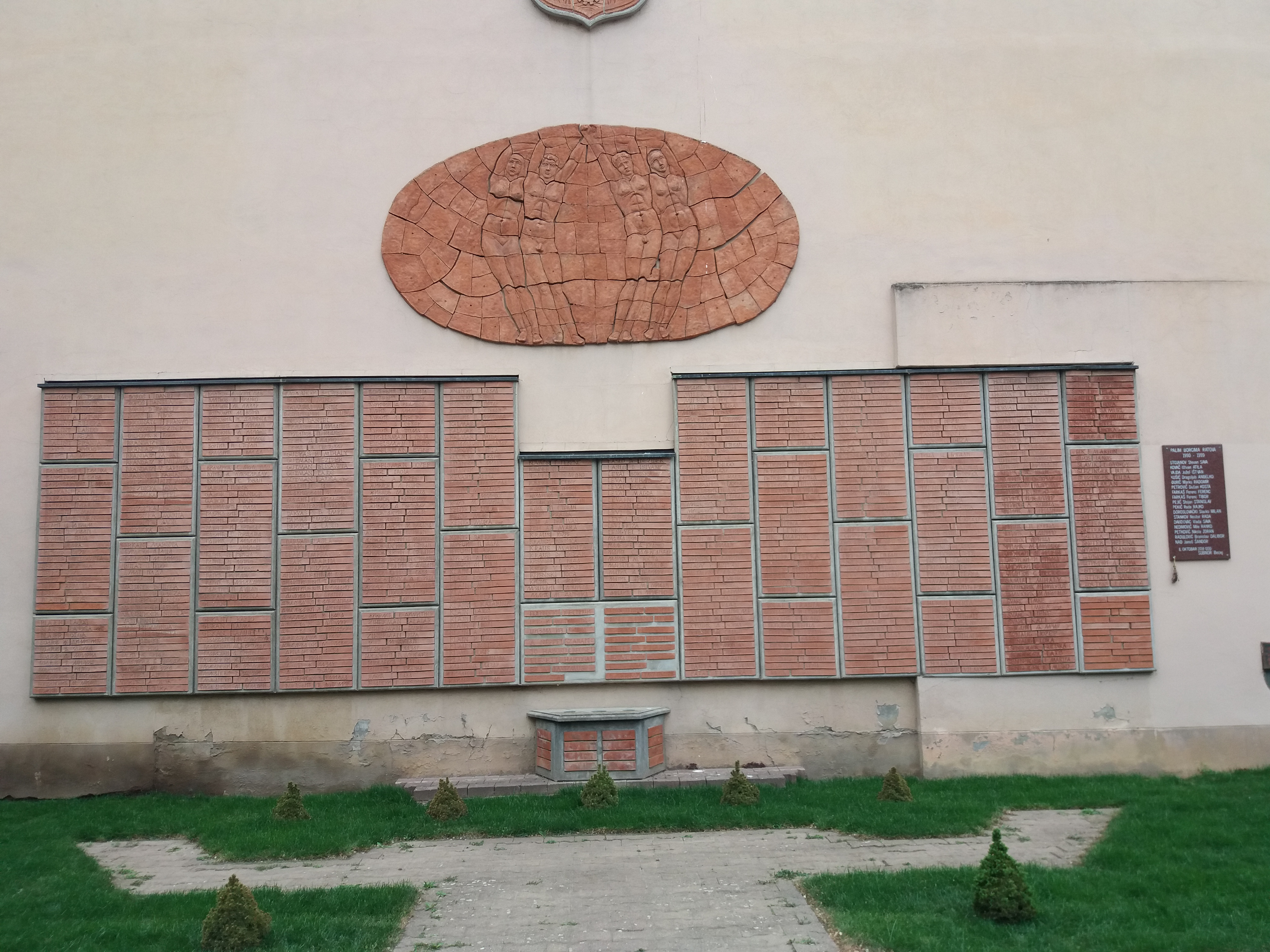
- Bečej Town Hall Fantast Castle Technical School in Bečej Old Windmill Church of St. George Church of the Assumption of Blessed Virgin Mary Šlajz DTD Canal Gates Bečej Brewery Monument to King Peter I the Liberator Monuments to the fallen warriors from the Yugoslav Wars

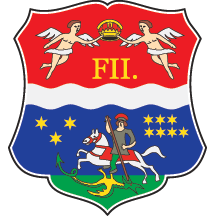
- Coat of arms

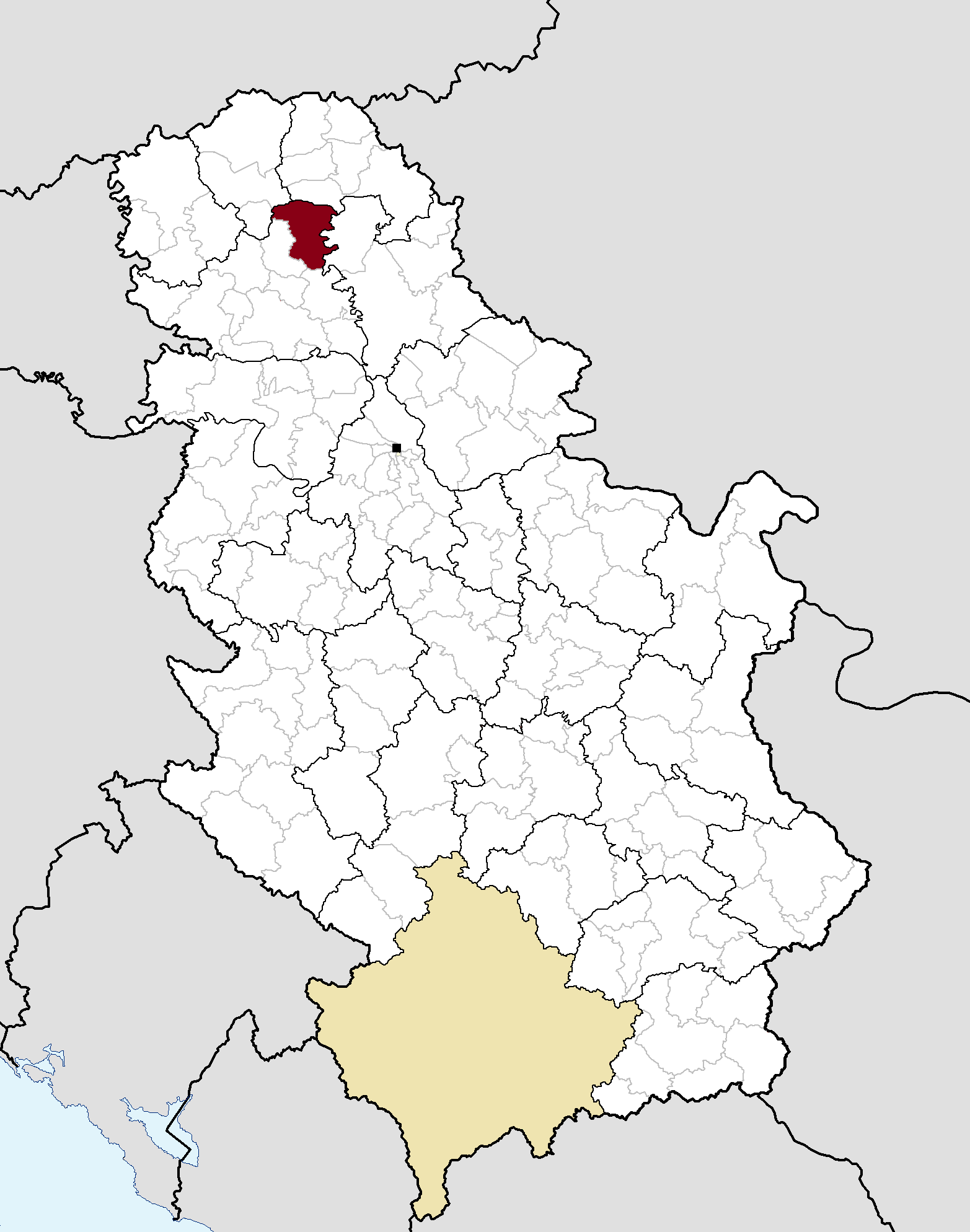
- Location of the municipality of Bečej within Serbia
- Coordinates: 45°37′N 20°02′E
- Country: Serbia
- Province: Vojvodina
- District: South Bačka
- Settlements: 5

Government
  - Mayor: Vuk Radojević (SNS)

Area
  - Municipality: 487 km^{2} (188 sq mi)
- Elevation: 82 m (269 ft)

Population (2022 census)
  - Town: 19,492
  - Municipality: 30,681
- Time zone: UTC+1 (CET)
  - Summer (DST): UTC+2 (CEST)
- Postal code: 21220
- Area code: +381 21
- Car plates: BČ
- Official languages: Serbian together with Hungarian
- Website: www.becej.rs

Bečej (Serbian Cyrillic: Бечеј, pronounced [bɛ̌tʃɛːj]; Hungarian: Óbecse, pronounced [ˈoːbɛt͡ʃɛ]) is a town and municipality located in the South Bačka District of the autonomous province of Vojvodina, Serbia. The town has a population of 19,492, while the municipality has 30,681 inhabitants.

== History ==
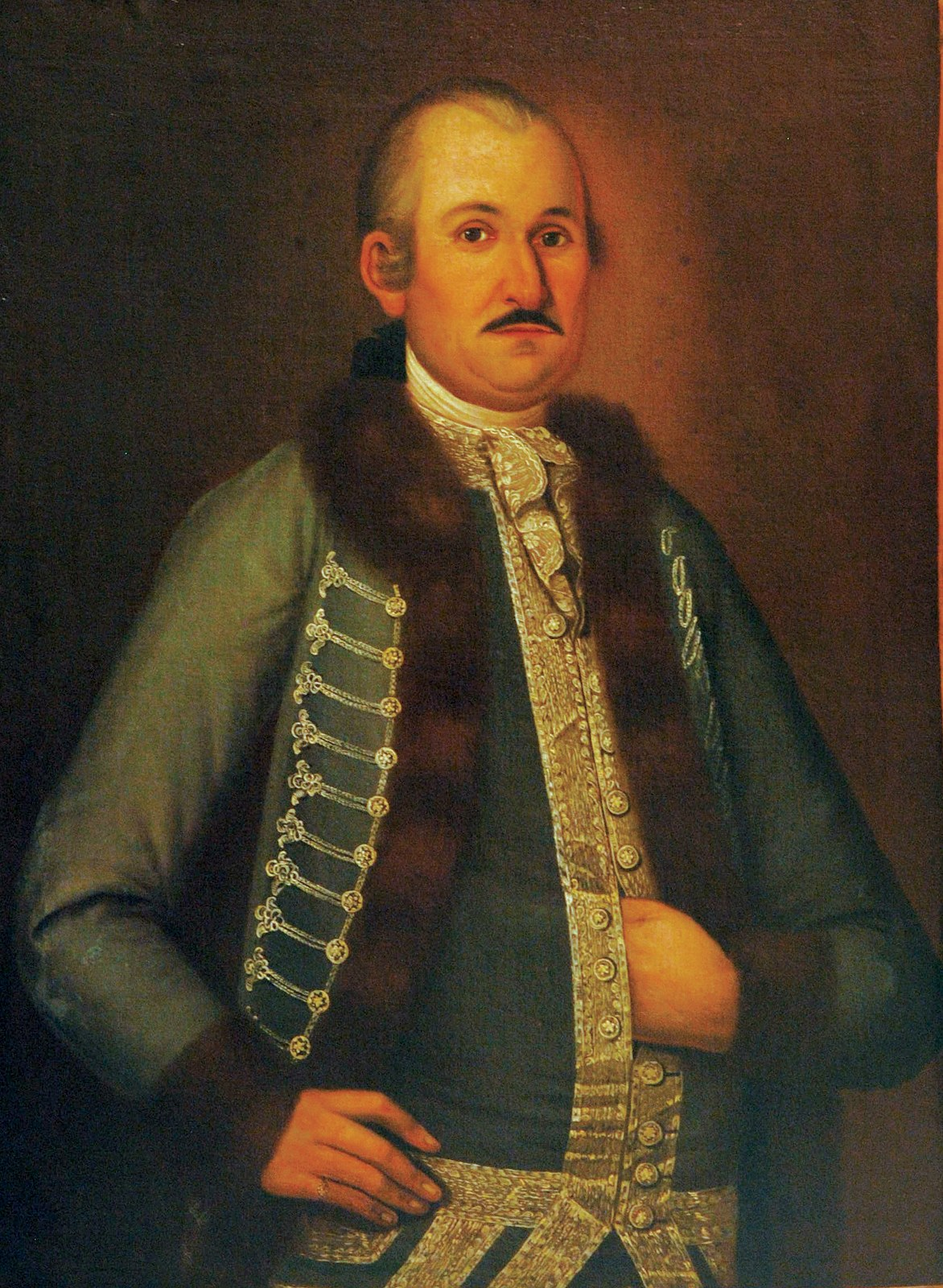
Portrait of Jakov Čokić, a spahija (landowner) from Bečej, c. 1780, in the Gallery of Matica Srpska

Bečej was mentioned first during the administration of the Kingdom of Hungary in 1091 under its Latin name Bechey and later in 1238 under Hungarian name Becse. The name probably originated from the Bechey family that had possessions in this area. In the 15th century (from 1419 to 1441) the town was a possession of the Serbian despot Đurađ Branković. Expecting the upcoming defeat of the Serbian Despotate Đurađ Branković transferred all of his movable assets to Bečej before his death in 1456.

In the end of the 15th century, the army of the Kingdom of Hungary led by Serbian despot Vuk Grgurević (Zmaj Ognjeni Vuk) defeated the Ottoman army near Bečej. In 1551, an Ottoman army led by Mehmed paša Sokolović conquered the town. Bečej was administered by the Ottomans between 1551 and 1687 (nominally to 1699) and was part of the Sanjak of Segedin, which was initially in Budin eyalet, latterly in Eğri Eyalet. In Ottoman Turkish it was known as "Beçe".

In the end of the 17th century the Ottoman administration was replaced by a Habsburg one and the settlement was populated by ethnic Serbs from Banat who had run away from the Ottoman Empire. Between 1702 and 1751, the town belonged to the Tisza-Maros section of the Habsburg Military Frontier. After the abolishment of this part of the Frontier in 1751, many Serbs from the town emigrated to Russia (notably to New Serbia and Slavo-Serbia). They founded a new settlement with name Bečej (presently Oleksandriia) in New Serbia. To prevent this emigration, the Habsburg authorities formed the autonomous District of Potisje with seat in Bečej. The District of Potisje was in existence between 1751 and 1848. Three privileges were given to the district in 1759, 1774 and 1800 respectively. The first privilege of the District defined its autonomous status, while the second one allowed ethnic Hungarians to settle in the district. In the following period many Hungarians settled in Bečej (the first ones in 1757) and gradually replaced the Serbs as the dominant ethnicity in the town. In 1751, the entire population of the town had been composed of Serbs, while in 1774 half of the population was made up of Serbs and another half was composed of Hungarians. According to the 1910 census, the population of Becse municipality numbered 54,275 people, of whom 30,465 spoke Hungarian and 22,821 Serbian. The town of Bečej had 19,372 inhabitants in 1910, of which 12,488 spoke Hungarian (64.46%), 6,582 Serbian (33.98%) and 193 German (1%).

A Serb elementary school in Bečej was opened in 1703; it is one of the oldest schools in Vojvodina as well as the first elementary school among Serbs. A Hungarian elementary school was opened in Bečej in 1765, while the Jewish elementary school was opened in 1882. A Serb reading house was opened in 1862, and a Hungarian reading house was opened in 1869.

In 1918 Bečej became part of the Kingdom of Serbs, Croats and Slovenes and subsequent South Slavic states. During the Hungarian Axis occupation, in the 1942 raid, 215 inhabitants of the town were murdered by Hungarian forces, of whom 111 were men, 72 women, 13 children, and 19 elders. By nationality, the victims included 110 Jews, 102 Serbs, and 1 Hungarian.

== Inhabited places ==
Bečej municipality includes the town of Bečej and the following villages:

- Bačko Gradište (Hungarian: Bácsföldvár)
- Bačko Petrovo Selo (Hungarian: Péterréve)
- Mileševo (Hungarian: Kutaspuszta and Drea)
- Radičević (also known as Čikerija)

Note: for settlements with absolute or relative Hungarian majority names are also given in Hungarian.

There are also several sub-settlements in the municipality, including:

- Poljanice (Hungarian: Pecesor)
- Novo Selo
- Drljan (Hungarian: Drea)

== Demographics ==
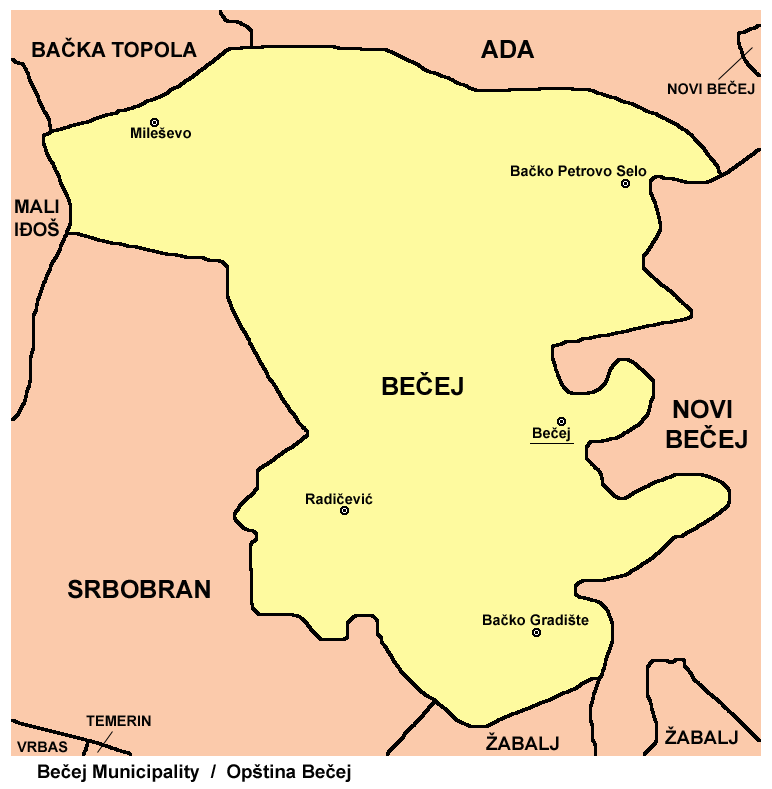
Map of Bečej municipality

Historical population
Year	Pop.	±% p.a.
1948	42,071	—
1953	43,021	+0.45%
1961	44,585	+0.45%
1971	44,976	+0.09%
1981	44,243	−0.16%
1991	42,685	−0.36%
2002	40,987	−0.37%
2011	37,351	−1.03%
2022	30,681	−1.77%

According to the 2022 census results, the town of Bečej had 19,492 inhabitants while municipality of Bečej had 30,681 inhabitants.

=== Ethnic structure ===
Bečej is an ethnically mixed town and municipality. There is one settlement with a Serb ethnic majority, Radičević, while town of Bečej and Bačko Gradište have Serb ethnic plurality. Settlements with a Hungarian ethnic majority are Bačko Petrovo Selo and Mileševo.

The ethnic structure of population of town of Bečej (according to the 2022 census):

Ethnicity	Population	Share
Serbs	9,098	46.6%
Hungarians	7,081	36.3%
Roma	210	1%
Others	751	3.8%
Undeclared	1,337	6.8%
Unknown	1,015	5.2%

The ethnic structure of population of Bečej municipality (according to the 2022 census):

Ethnicity	Population	Share
Serbs	12,996	42.3%
Hungarians	12,482	40.7%
Roma	877	2.8%
Others	1,003	3.2%
Undeclared	1,858	6%
Unknown	1,465	4.1%

== Economy ==
The following table gives a preview of total number of registered people employed in legal entities per their core activity (as of 2018):

Activity	Total
Agriculture, forestry and fishing	938
Mining and quarrying	13
Manufacturing	2,063
Electricity, gas, steam and air conditioning supply	62
Water supply; sewerage, waste management and remediation activities	127
Construction	190
Wholesale and retail trade, repair of motor vehicles and motorcycles	1,170
Transportation and storage	399
Accommodation and food services	162
Information and communication	96
Financial and insurance activities	118
Real estate activities	11
Professional, scientific and technical activities	417
Administrative and support service activities	154
Public administration and defense; compulsory social security	441
Education	628
Human health and social work activities	500
Arts, entertainment and recreation	81
Other service activities	145
Individual agricultural workers	592
Total	8,307

== Notable people ==
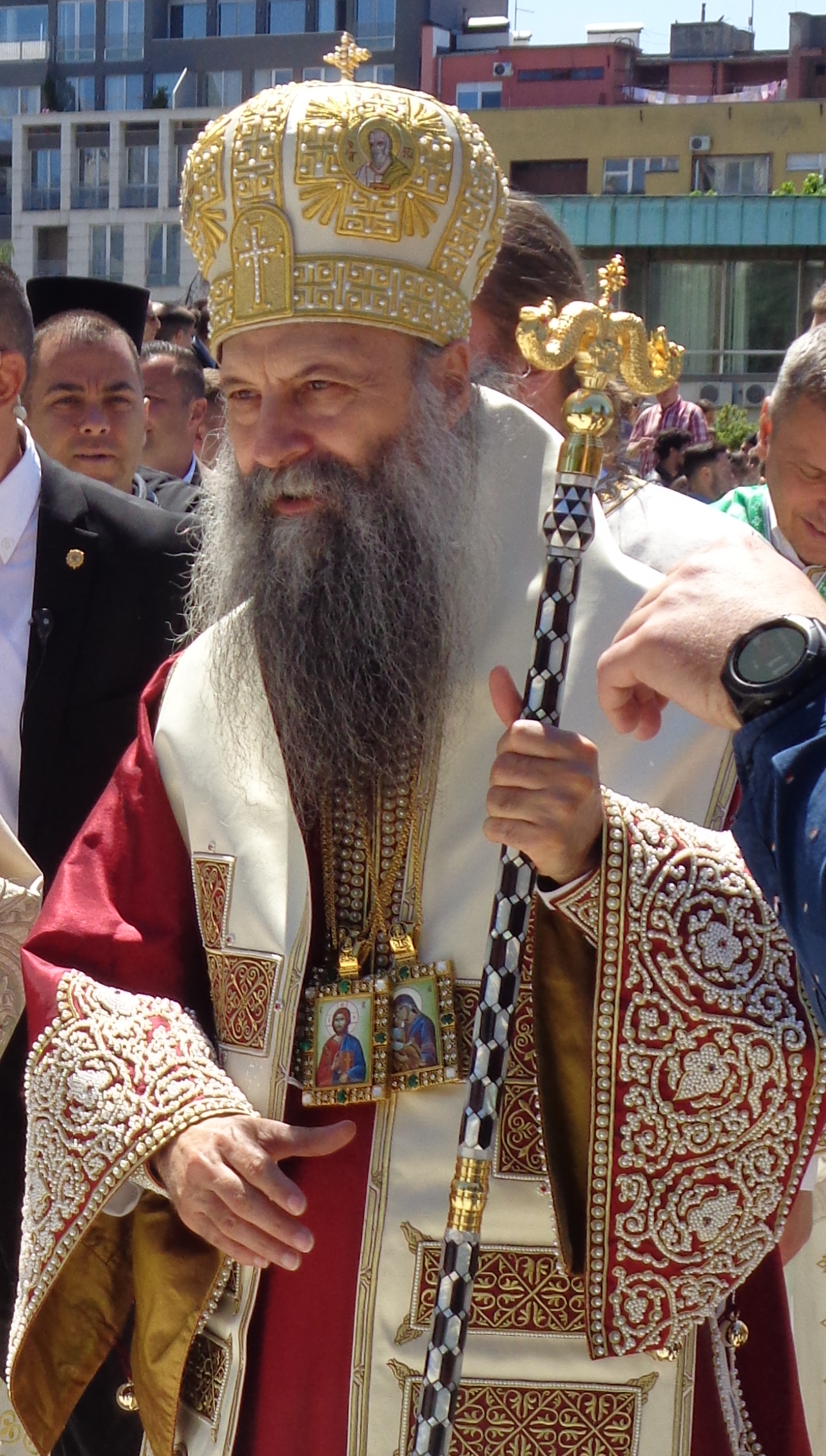
Porfirije, Serbian Patriarch

- Janika Balaž, Romani tamburica musician
- Dejan Perić, Serbian handball player
- Aleksandar Popović Sandor, first Serb geologist
- Carl von Than, Austro-Hungarian chemist
- Mór Than, Hungarian painter
- Aleksandar Maćašev, Serbian artist and designer
- Emeric Feher, French photographer
- Marko Tomićević, Serbian sprint canoer, Olympic silver medalist, World and European champion
- Marko Novaković, Serbian sprint canoer, World and European champion
- Dejan Terzić, Serbian sprint canoer
- Borislava Perić, Serbian table tennis player, Paralympic champion and three-time silver medalist
- Stevan V. Popović, Serbian cultural leader
- Melinda Nadj Abonji, Swiss writer born in Bečej
- Milos Sarcev, IFBB professional bodybuilder and coach
- Slobodan Kalinic, Serbian basketball coach
- Porfirije, Serbian Patriarch

== International relations ==
=== Twin towns – Sister cities ===
Bečej is twinned with:

- Miercurea-Ciuc, Romania
- Szekszárd, Hungary
- Csongrád, Hungary

== Sports ==
Bečej is famous for its water polo club VK Bečej which won LEN Champions League in 2000. when the city of Bečej was the host of Final Four. Football club OFK Bečej 1918 has played in the top-tier First League of Serbia and Montenegro in the 1990s and later in the second-tier Serbian First League.

== See also ==
- Novi Bečej
- List of cities, towns and villages in Vojvodina
- Fantast Castle, 19th-century castle in the vicinity of Bečej
- Sojaprotein, agribusiness company based in Bečej
