= Siget (Novi Kneževac) =

Siget Сигет (Serbian)
- Village (Selo)
- Location of Vojvoda Zimonić within Serbia Siget (Serbia) Siget (Europe)
- Coordinates: 46°04′46″N 20°13′53″E
- Country: Serbia
- Province: Vojvodina
- District: North Banat
- Municipalities: Novi Kneževac

Population (2002)
  - Siget: 247
- Time zone: UTC+1 (CET)
  - Summer (DST): UTC+2 (CEST)
- Area code: +381(0)230
- Car plates: KI

Siget (Serbian Cyrillic: Сигет) is a village located in the Novi Kneževac municipality, in the North Banat District of Serbia. It is situated in the Autonomous Province of Vojvodina. The village has a Serb ethnic majority (73.27%) with a significant Hungarian minority (25.50%) and its population numbering 247 people (2002 census).

== Name ==
In Serbian the settlement is known as Siget (Сигет), and in Hungarian as Sziget. Former Serbian name for this settlement was Mali Siget (Мали Сигет). Mali Siget means "little Siget", while name Veliki Siget (Велики Сигет, meaning: "big Siget") was used for neighbouring uninhabited area.

== Historical population ==
- 1981: 358
- 1991: 294
- 2002: 247

== See also ==
- List of places in Serbia
- List of cities, towns and villages in Vojvodina
