= Filić, Serbia =

Filić Филић (Serbian)
- Village (Selo)
- Location of Vojvoda Zimonić within Serbia Filić (Serbia) Filić (Europe)
- Coordinates: 46°02′58″N 20°08′54″E
- Country: Serbia
- Province: Vojvodina
- District: North Banat
- Municipalities: Novi Kneževac

Population (2002)
  - Filić: 161
- Time zone: UTC+1 (CET)
  - Summer (DST): UTC+2 (CEST)
- Postal code: 23330
- Area code: +381(0)230
- Car plates: KI

Filić (Serbian Cyrillic: Филић) is a village located in the Novi Kneževac municipality, in the North Banat District of Serbia. It is situated in the Autonomous Province of Vojvodina. The village has a Serb ethnic majority (60.24%) with a significant Hungarian minority (38.50%). It has a population of 161 people (2002 census).

== Name ==
In Serbian the settlement is known as Filić (Филић) and in Hungarian as Firigyháza. Former name for the village used in Serbian was Firiđhaza (Фириђхаза) or Firiđhaz (Фириђхаз), and in some Serbian sources name of the village is also written as Firić (Фирић).

== Historical population ==
- 1981: 192
- 1991: 170
- 2002: 161

== See also ==
- List of places in Serbia
- List of cities, towns and villages in Vojvodina
