= Novi Kneževac =

Town and municipality in Vojvodina, Serbia

Novi Kneževac Нови Кнежевац (Serbian) Törökkanizsa (Hungarian)
- Town and municipality
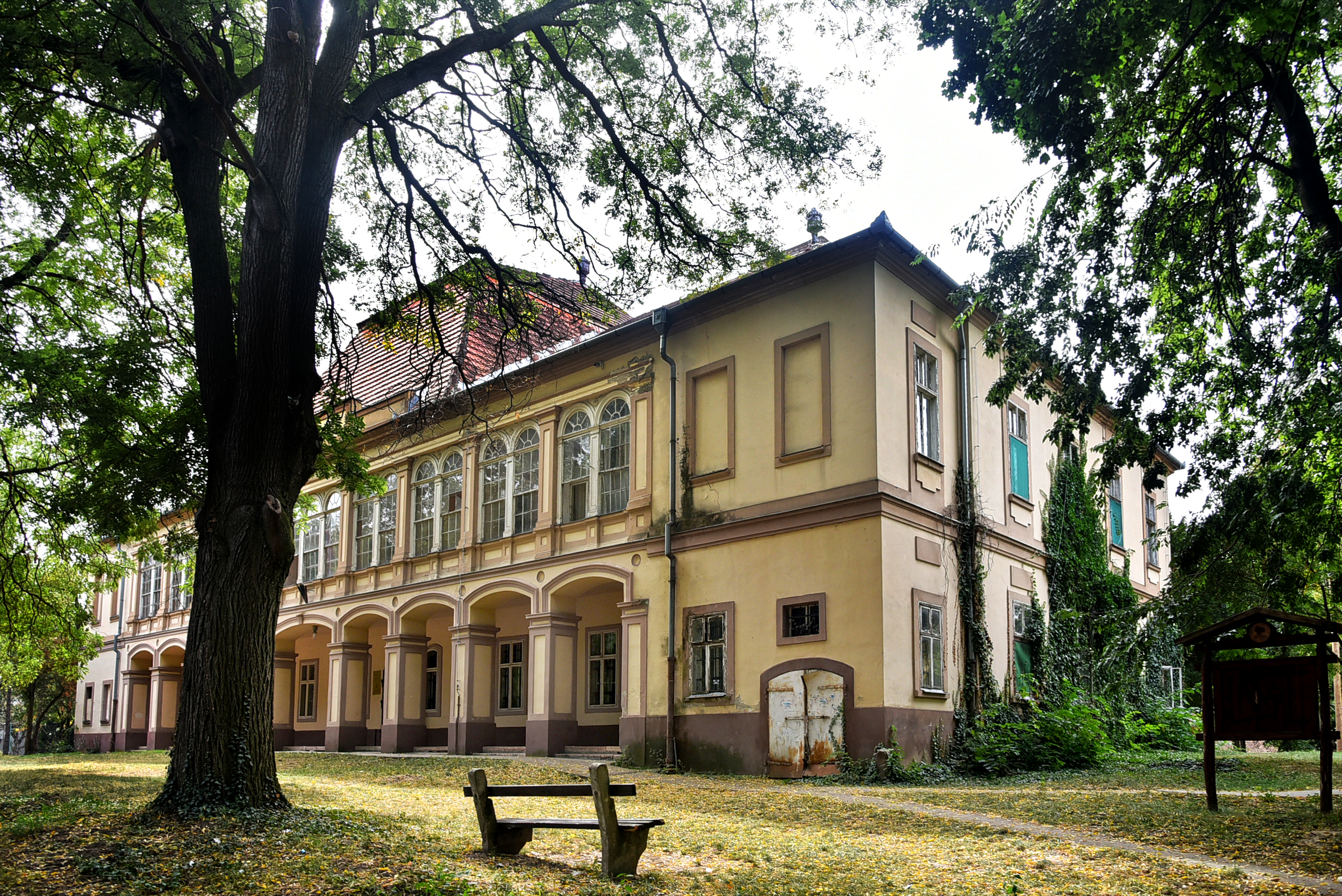
- Servijski estate

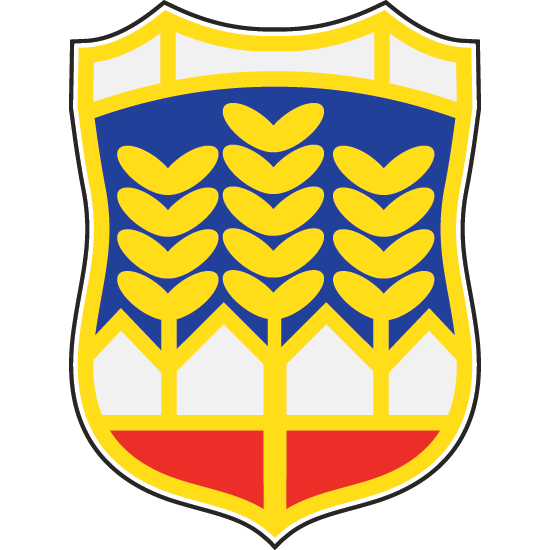
- Coat of arms

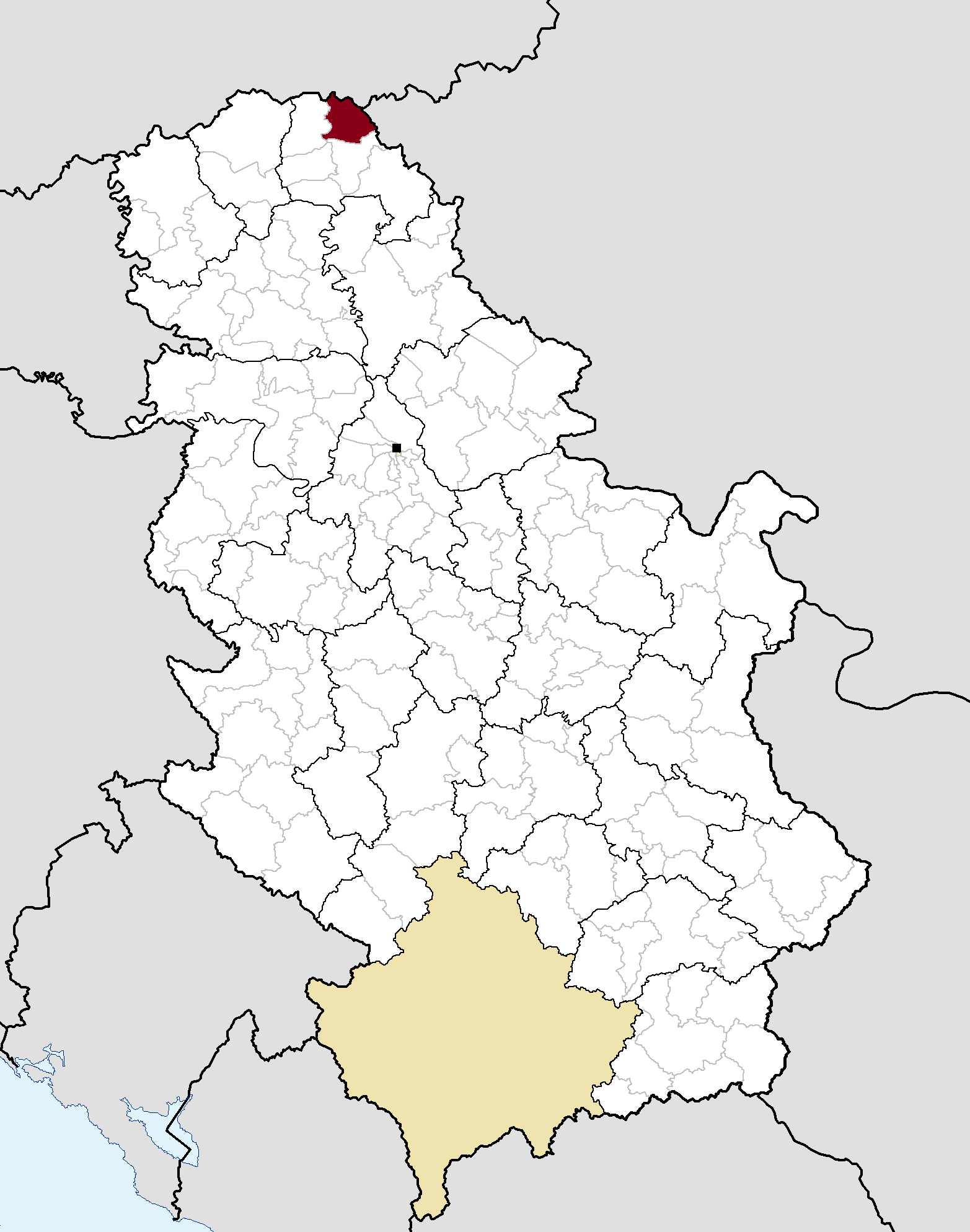
- Location of Novi Kneževac within Serbia
- Coordinates: 46°03′N 20°06′E
- Country: Serbia
- Province: Vojvodina
- District: North Banat

Government
  - Mayor: Radovan Uverić (SNS)

Area
  - Novi Kneževac: 305.0 km^{2} (117.76 sq mi)
- Elevation: 84 m (276 ft)

Population (2022)
  - Novi Kneževac: 5,688
  - Metro: 8,627
- Time zone: UTC+1 (CET)
  - Summer (DST): UTC+2 (CEST)
- Postal code: 23330
- Area code: +381(0)230
- Car plates: KI
- Official languages: Serbian together with Hungarian
- Website: www.noviknezevac.rs; www.noviknezevac.info

Novi Kneževac (Serbian Cyrillic: Нови Кнежевац, [nɔ̂ʋiː knɛ̌ːʒɛʋats]; Hungarian: Törökkanizsa; German: Neu-Kanischa) is a town and municipality located in the North Banat District of the autonomous province of Vojvodina, Serbia. The town has a population of 5,688, while the Novi Kneževac municipality has 8,627 inhabitants according to 2022 census.

== Name ==
The Serbian name of the town originates in the Serbian word "knez" ("prince" in English), and the full meaning of the name is "the prince's new place" in English.

The city's name in various languages include Serbian: Novi Kneževac or Нови Кнежевац, Hungarian: Törökkanizsa ([ˈtørøkkɒniʒɒ]), Romanian: Noul Cnezat, Croatian: Novi Kneževac, and German: Neu-Kanischa.

The older Serbian names used for the town were Turska Kanjiža (Турска Кањижа), Mala Kanjiža (Мала Кањижа) and Nova Kanjiža (Нова Кањижа).

The Serbian and Hungarian languages are officially used by the municipal authorities.

== History ==
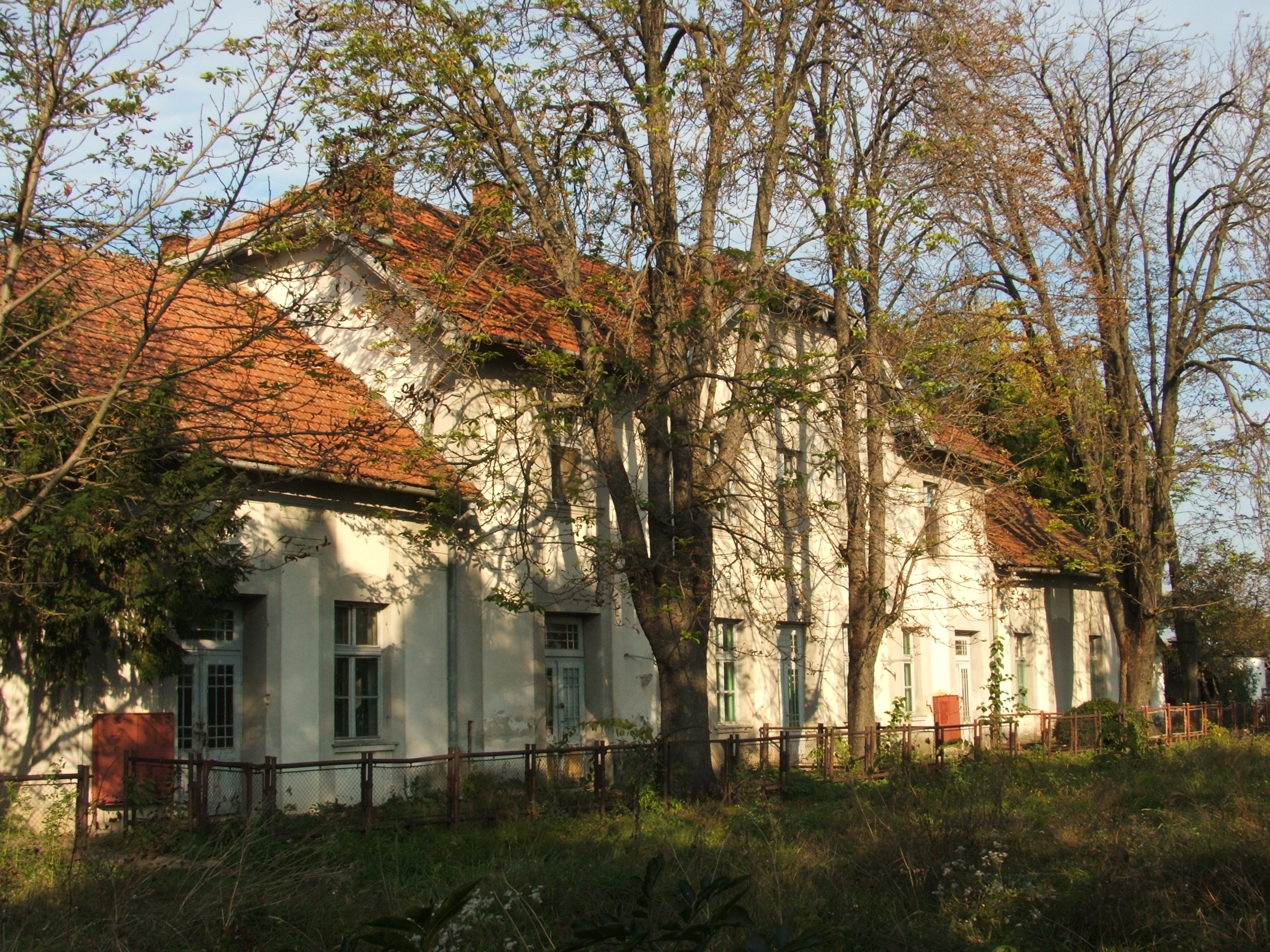
Novi Kneževac railway station

People inhabited this area as early as the Neolithic era as well. Historically, the region was populated by Sarmatians, Gepids, Huns, Avars and Slavs. The first written record of Novi Kneževac was made in the ninth century, mentioning under the name "Kneža". In the next century, it was mentioned as "Kanjiša". Until the arrival of the Ottomans, it was under the administration of Hungarian feudal landlords. In the 16th century, during the Ottoman administration, it was populated by Serbs, its name became known as "Turska Kanjiža" and there were already 30-40 houses in the settlement at the beginning of the 18th century

In the 18th century, it became part of the Habsburg monarchy, and in 1752, in the vicinity of Turska Kanjiža, a new settlement was built by Serbs coming from Pomorišje, who settled here after the Military Frontier had been abolished in that region. The name of the newly built settlement in the neighborhood was Jozefovo or Jozefsdorf (later known as Obilićevo) and in 1945, the two settlements became one.

In the 18th century, the economic and cultural life of Turska Kanjiža started thriving; Marko Servijski founded an association whose name was "Stipendarius Servijski" or "Platoneum", which was the largest stipendist foundation among Serbs and Cincars at that time. By this association, a regular allowance was allocated to the reformer of the Serbian language, Lukijan Mušicki. In 1885, a pontoon bridge was opened between Turska Kanjiža and Stara Kanjiža. In the 18th century, both settlements, Turska Kanjiža and Jozefovo were populated mainly by Serbs, however, 1910 census already recorded that the Hungarian speakers exceeded in number the Serbian ones in both settlements. As for the territory of present-day Novi Kneževac municipality, 1910 census recorded 18,513 inhabitants in the area, of which 9,295 (50.21%) spoke Serbian and 8,823 (47.66%) Hungarian (Note that this data is calculated on the present-day territory of Novi Kneževac municipality, not on the territory of historical municipality, which included a much larger territory than the modern one in 1910 and in which the Hungarian speakers were more numerous than the Serbian ones).

In 1918, it became part of the Kingdom of Serbs, Croats and Slovenes (later renamed to Yugoslavia). In 1922, the name "Nova Kanjiža" was officially adopted which was altered to "Novi Kneževac" in 1935 and in 1932, it was the site of the first football match illuminated by electric lanterns in Yugoslavia. Until 1981, the largest ethnic group in the town were Hungarians but with a different demographic trend. The proportion of Serbs increased, while the proportion of Hungarians fell, and in 1981 evinced by all the following censuses, Serbs became the most numerous ethnic group. Nonetheless, there has been a permanent ethnic Serb majority in the territory of present-day Novi Kneževac municipality for several centuries.

== Inhabited places ==
The Novi Kneževac municipality includes the town of Novi Kneževac, which is situated along the river bank of Tisa, and eight villages. The villages are:

- Banatsko Aranđelovo
- Đala
- Filić
- Majdan (Hungarian: Magyarmajdány)
- Podlokanj
- Rabe (Hungarian: Rábé)
- Siget
- Srpski Krstur

Note: The Hungarian names are also mentioned at those places where there is a Hungarian ethnic majority.

== Demographics ==
Historical population
Year	Pop.	±% p.a.
1948	17,311	—
1953	17,680	+0.42%
1961	17,831	+0.11%
1971	16,509	−0.77%
1981	15,026	−0.94%
1991	13,816	−0.84%
2002	12,975	−0.57%
2011	11,269	−1.55%
2022	8,627	−2.40%

According to the 2011 census, the total population of the Novi Kneževac municipality was 11,269 inhabitants.

=== Ethnic groups ===
Municipality

The population of the Novi Kneževac municipality is composed of:

- Serbs = 6,445 (57.19%)
- Hungarians = 3,217 (28.55%)
- Romani = 923 (8.19%)
- Others and undeclared = 684 (6.07%)

The places where there is a Serb ethnic majority are Novi Kneževac, Banatsko Aranđelovo, Siget, Filić, Srpski Krstur, Đala, and Podlokanj and there are two villages Majdan and Rabe with a Hungarian ethnic majority. The names of the settlements where there is a Hungarian population of more than 20% are Novi Kneževac, Filić, Banatsko Aranđelovo, and Siget.

Town

The population of the Novi Kneževac town is composed of:

- Serbs = 3,990 (57.33%)
- Hungarians = 2,355 (33.84%)
- Romani = 142 (2.04%)
- Others and undeclared = 473 (6.79%)

== Notable people ==
- Brana Vlasic, table tennis player

== Gallery ==
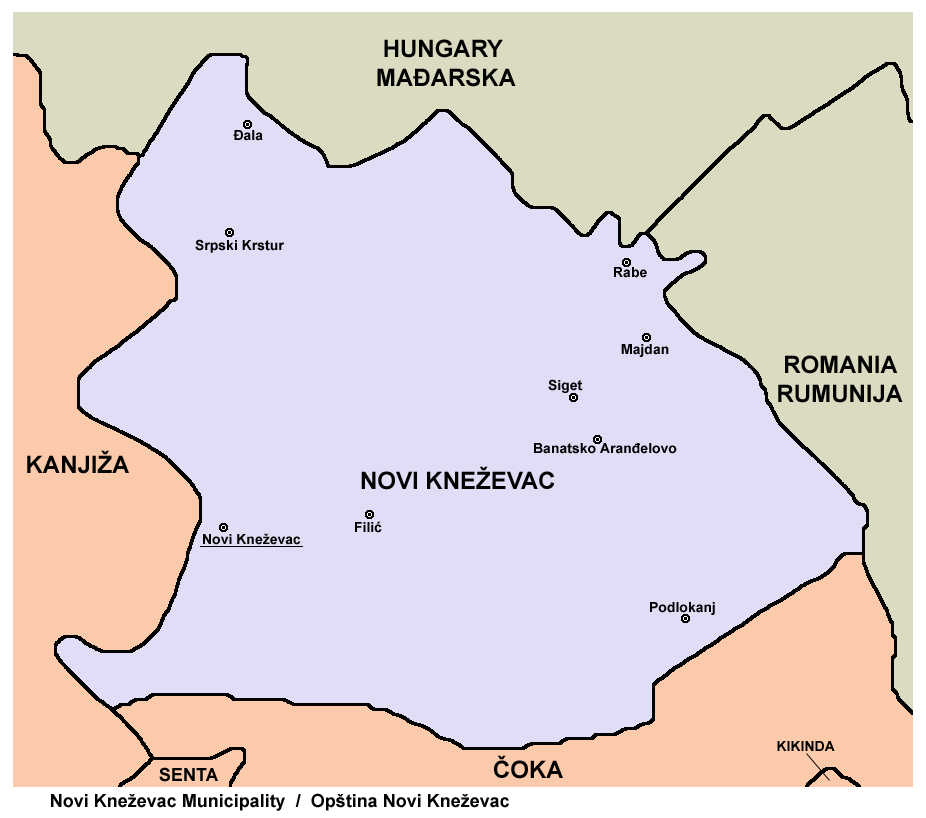
Map of Novi Kneževac municipality

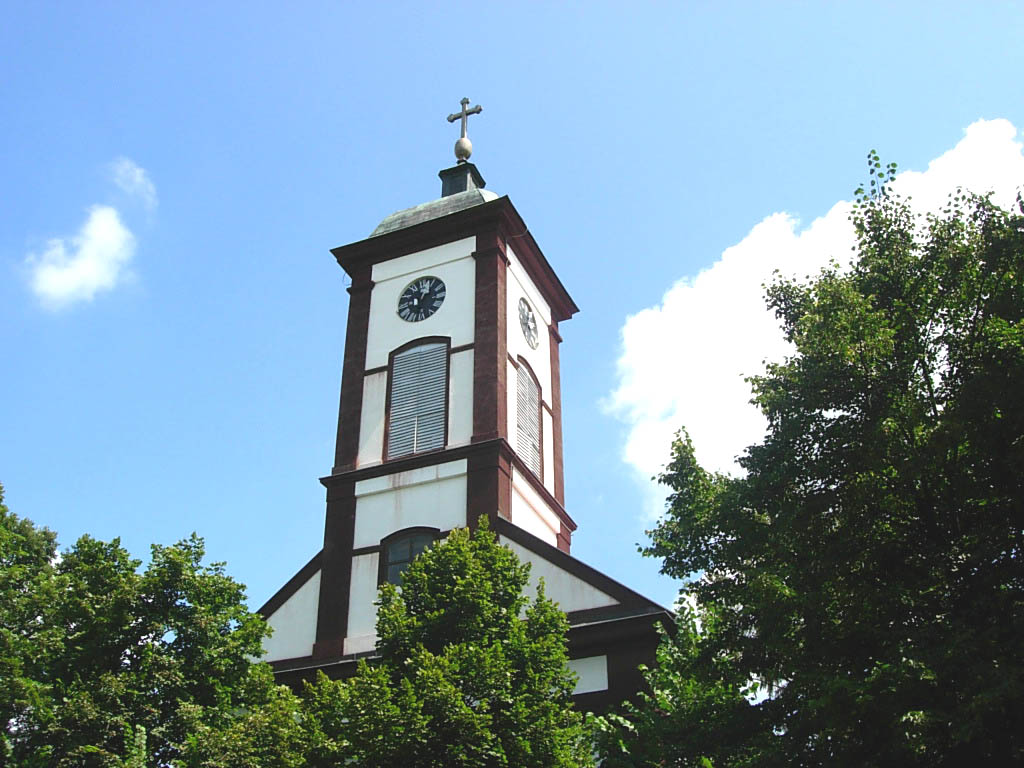
The Saint George Martyr Catholic Church

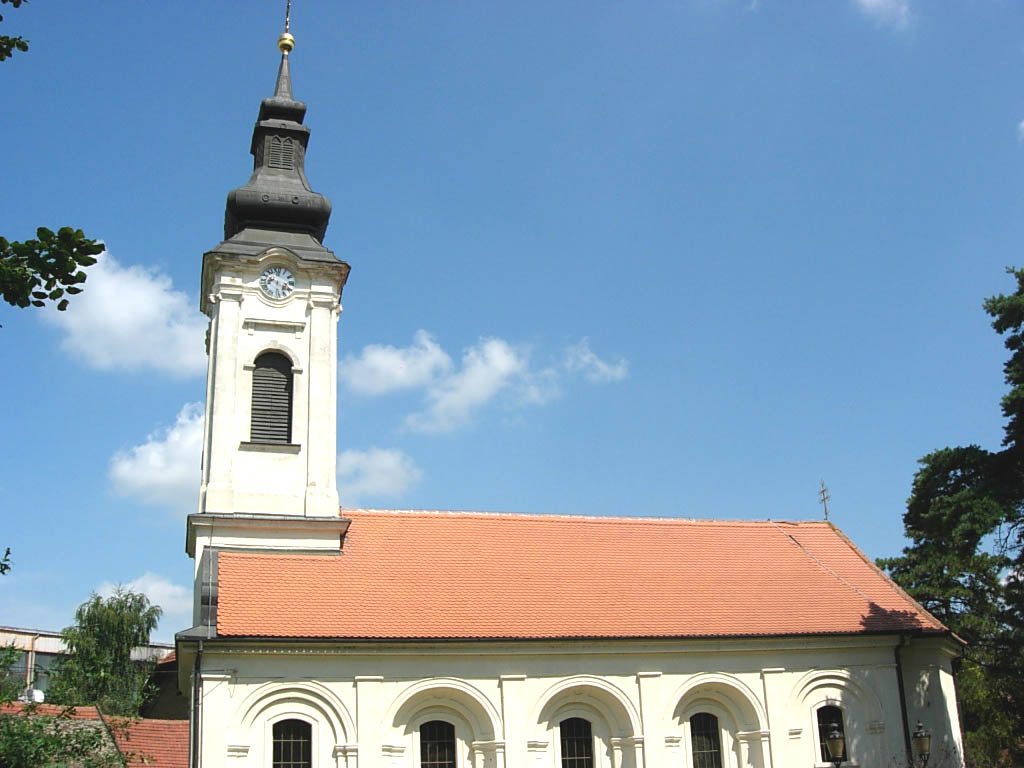
Orthodox Church

== See also ==
- List of places in Serbia
- List of cities, towns and villages in Vojvodina
- Municipalities of Serbia
- North Banat District
