= Banat Land Militia =

- Banater Landmiliz
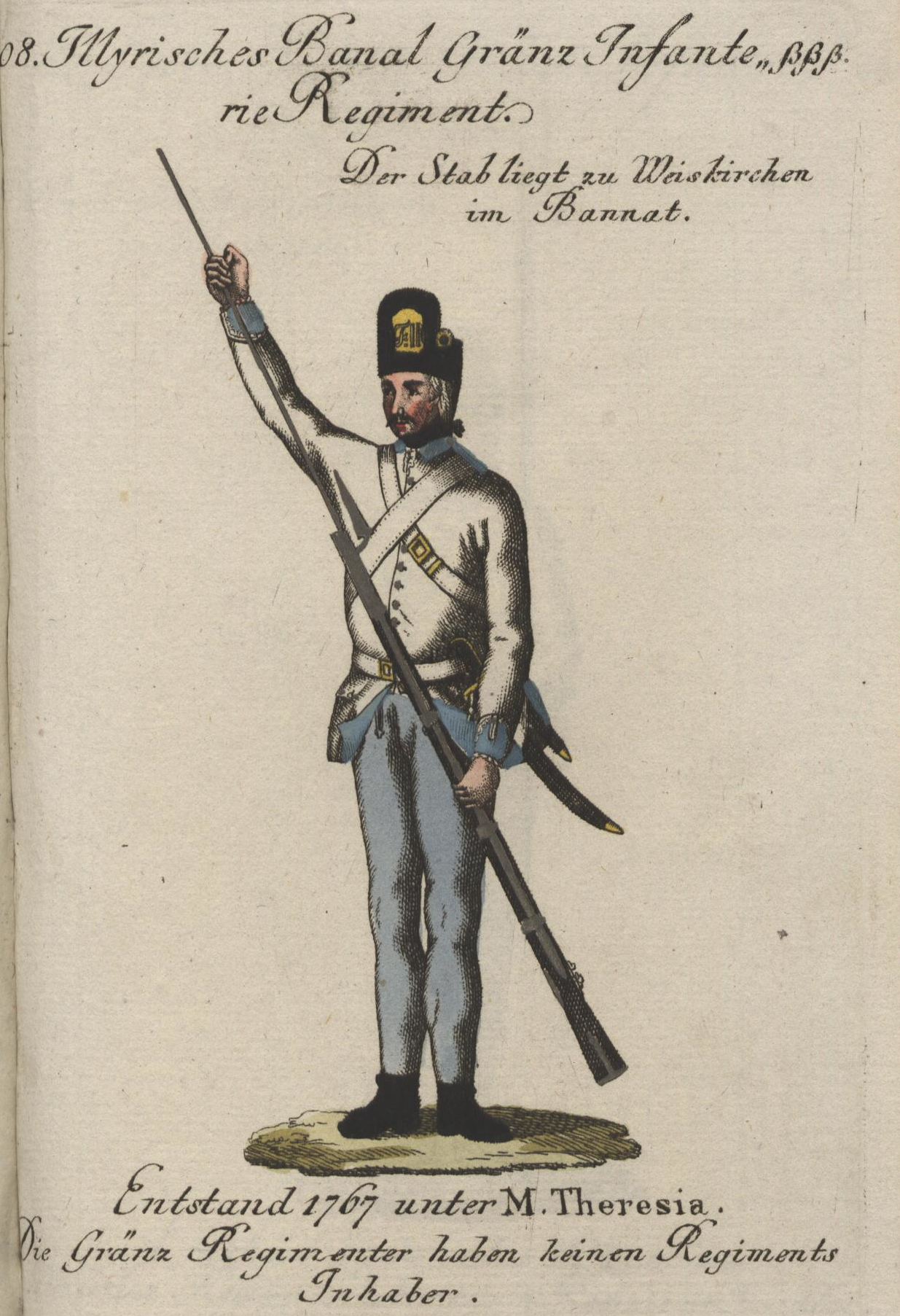
- 1796 illustration of 1767 uniform
- Active: 1746–73
- Disbanded: 1764–73
- Country: Habsburg Monarchy
- Type: militia (infantry-cavalry)
- Role: Defence of Military Frontier
- Size: 1,841 (1752)
- Engagements: Seven Years' War (1756–63)

Commanders
- Commander: Simbschen (1746–53)

The Banat Land Militia (German: Banater Landmiliz) or Land Battalion (Landesbataillon, Banater Land-Bataillon) was a militia of the Habsburg Monarchy active in the Banat of Temeswar and Banat Military Frontier between 1746 and 1773.

The Militia (Banater Miliz) of the Banat of Temeswar was organized by graf de Mercy in 1724, led by Serbian veterans. In 1744–47 Engelshofen organized the Land Militia of Banat (Banater Landmiliz). Earlier, the ober-knezes (chief community headmans) of the Banat had, in sign of loyalty to Maria Theresa, raised a freikorps (volunteer unit) on their own expense that numbered 700 infantry and 106 Hussars, mostly ethnic Serbs. This volunteer unit was transformed into the Banat Land Militia (also called Landesbataillon), put under the command of hauptmann and obristlieutenant Simbschen. Simbschen was earlier the commandant, while ranked major, of the "Temesvárer Frei-Bataillon" volunteer unit (fl. 1744–45) established by the Banat knezes, that participated in the Succession War and was dissolved after the Treaty of Dresden (December 1745). A part of that unit joined to form the Banat Land Militia. In 1746–47 the Banat Land Militia was planned to have four infantry companies and two Hussar companies (an estimated 2020 men). The Banat Military Frontier was established in 1751, and by 1752 the Landmiliz had 1841 men.

The Land Militia was made up of the Upper Companies (left bank of Tisa) and Lower Companies (along the Nera river, Nova Palanka near the Danube).

- Upper Companies, officer ranks made up of Tisa-Mureş Frontier ex-officers from Bačka.
- Lower Companies, after 1753 most officers were ex-members of the Nazionalmiliz and the Simbschen battalion.

The Militia was eventually disestablished with the formation of regular regiments in 1764–73 – the Illyrian Regiment headquartered in Bela Crkva and the Ansiedlungs Regiment (later "German") headquartered in Pančevo.

== See also ==
- Rascians
- Hajduks
- Šajkaši

== Sources ==
- Dabić, Vojin S. (2011). "The Habsburg-Ottoman War of 1716-1718 and Demographic Changes in the War-Afflicted Territories". The Peace of Passarowitz, 1718. West Lafayette: Purdue University Press. pp. 191–208.
- Ilić-Mandić, Jelena (2020). "The Local Elite in Central Government Service: Banat Military Frontier Officers in the 18th Century". The Habsburg State-wide and the regions in the Southern Danube basin (16th-20th centuries). Wien: New academic press. pp. 99–121.
- Ilić-Mandić, Jelena (2021). "Forging the Wallachian Military Border, 1769-1772" (PDF). Banatica. 31 (2): 251–273.
- Ilić-Mandić, Jelena (2022a). "Making the Border and Frontiersmen: Militarisation in Temeswarer Banat, 1764-1775". From medieval frontiers to early modern borders in Central and South-Eastern Europe. Berlin: Peter Lang Publishing. pp. 207–228.
- Ilić-Mandić, Jelena (2022b). "The Military Frontier and Emigration Challenges in the 18th Century" (PDF). Migrations in the Slavic Cultural Space From the Middle Ages to the Present Day. Lódź: Wydawnictwo Universytetu Lódzkiego. pp. 45–62.
- Vaníček, Fr (1875). Specialgeschichte der Militärgrenze: aus Originalquellen und Quellenwerken geschöpft. Aus der Kaiserlich-Königlichen Hof- und Staatsdruckerei.
- Wrede, Alphons von (1898a). Geschichte der K. und K. Wehrmacht. Vol. 1. L. W. Seidel.
- Wrede, Alphons von (1898b). Geschichte der K. und K. Wehrmacht. Vol. 2. L. W. Seidel.
