= Omoljica =

Omoljica Омољица
- Village (Selo)
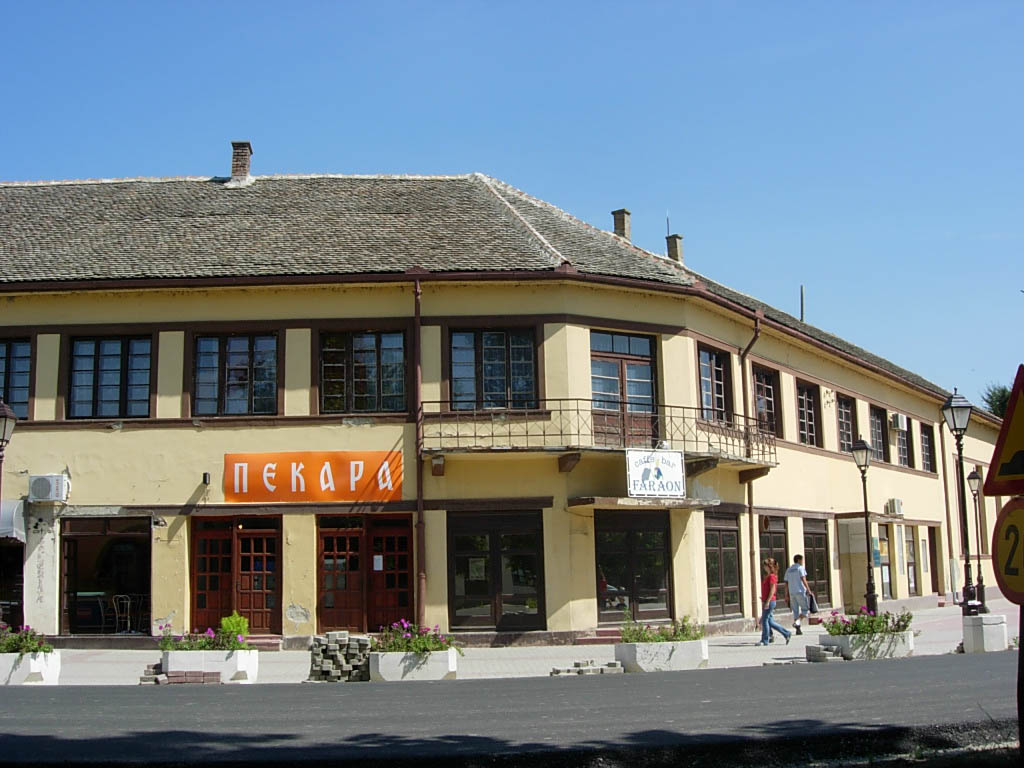
- Building in the center of the village.
- Interactive map of Omoljica
- Location of Omoljica within Serbia Omoljica (Serbia) Omoljica (Europe)
- Coordinates: 44°45′38″N 20°43′41″E
- Country: Serbia
- Province: Vojvodina
- District: South Banat
- Municipality: Pančevo

Area
  - Total: 77.26 km^{2} (29.83 sq mi)
- Elevation: 74 m (243 ft)

Population (2011)
  - Total: 6,309
  - Density: 81.66/km^{2} (211.5/sq mi)
- Time zone: UTC+1 (CET)
  - Summer (DST): UTC+2 (CEST)

Omoljica (Serbian Cyrillic: Омољица) is a village located in the municipality of Pančevo, South Banat District, Vojvodina, Serbia. The village population is 6,309 people (as of 2011 census).

== Location and geography ==
=== Location ===
Omoljica is located 15 kilometres (9.3 mi) southeast of city of Pančevo, its municipal seat, on the Pančevo-Banatski Brestovac road, which is in its section through Omoljica called Patrijarha Arsenija Čarnojevića Street. To the northwest are Starčevo, and further in the same direction, Vojlovica and Pančevo. Ivanovo, the Ivanovo Island and the mouth of the Nadela into the Danube are to the southwest. Banatski Brestovac is on the southeast, down the Ponjavica river and the road along it. The administrative village area borders Bavanište on the northeast, but the two villages are not directly connected by the road.

=== Geography ===
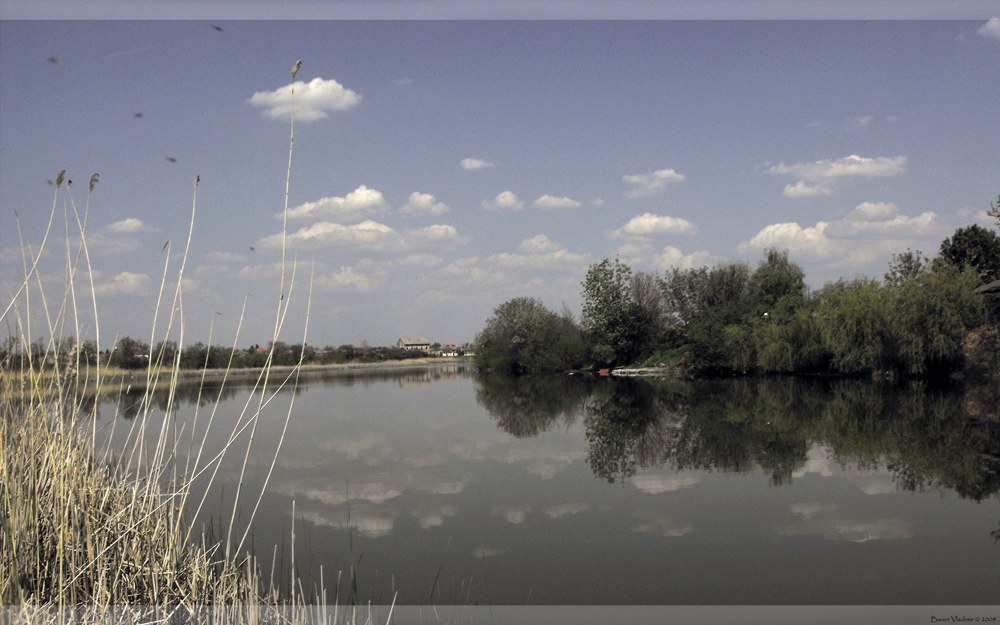
Ponjavica river

The village is situated on the protruded section of the loess terrace, in direction of the Danube's alluvial plain. Omoljica is in the valleys of the Ponjavica and Nadela rivers. Since 1995, there is a protected nature park Ponjavica south of Banatski Brestovac. Omoljica is situated at the mouth of the Ponjavica into the Nadela. Ponjavica flows from the southeast direction (Banatski Brestovac and Pločica), while Nadela comes from the north (Starčevo). Two rivers mark two borders of Omoljica - Ponjavica on the south, and Nadela on the west (Arvenica field). The channeled flow Srednji Begej passes north of Omoljica, in a direction parallel to the Ponjavica, and flows into the Nadela at Starčevo. South of Omoljica, in the flooplain of the Danube is an elongated bog Supiški Vir.

In 1894, forming of the park began with planting of three seedlings, two elms and one beech. There are numerous tree species in the park, including linden, white fir, oriental thuja, American sycamore, birch, maple and cherry plum. The park was placed next to the German parochial house and municipality of the Serbian Orthodox Church. It also included today non-existing small amphitheatre built from bricks, where brass bands performed every week. Heart-shaped park was built on the orders of the Austro-Hungarian authorities, as part of the much wider project of forestation of the Pannonian plain. Known today as the Village Park, it is located at the modern Saint Sava's Square.

One of the original three seedlings was the red leafed beech (Fagus sylvatica L.cv."Purpurea"). A generally rare cultivar in modern Serbia, it is a mountain species which grows in shadows and cold weather, unaccustomed to the lowlands of the Banat. However, the tree thrived, with its crown reaching a diameter of 25 metres (82 ft) and covering 4,500 square metres (48,000 sq ft). In 2016, it was declared a natural monument and placed under protection, as one of the best-preserved trees of this species in Vojvodina and was embellished with decorative lights. In September 2021 the tree was damaged in the short, but violent storm. A large chunk of the crown, almost a half, was ripped off. This disclosed that the tree was rotten inside, and completely dried up by November 2022.

=== Omoljica Spa ===
In the mid-1960s, the Naftagas company conducted drills in the area in search for oil. Near Omoljica, in 1968, at depth of 600 m (2,000 ft), instead of oil, springs of water began to pour onto the surface. Warm, 25 to 30 °C (77 to 86 °F) and sulfuric, which soon gained popularity with the local population and then the visitors from nearby cities. Though it became known as the Omoljica Spa, it never officially achieved that status. Municipality of Pančevo commissioned experts to conduct a study on the possible effects of the water and it turned out that it is mineral and medicinal, probably good for the gastrointestinal and rheumatic diseases and for the rehabilitation of orthopaedic injuries. Additionally, it bears a resemblance to the waters of the famous Hungarian Harkány spa.

The inhabitants took the initiative and built a small pool, while the larger one, with the area of 30 m^{2} (320 sq ft) was constructed in 1994. Local authorities tried to expand the facility through the Ministry of National Investment Plan, including the building of the small hotel, but the state wasn't interested in making any investment in the project. The large pool has been neglected and out of use but the local enthusiasts still use the old, small pool, even though the use of it has been forbidden due to the bacteriological contagion. A documentary on the Omoljica Spa, Kažu da je banja ("They say that this is the spa") was filmed.

Local shepherds were bringing sheep herds to drink water in the ponds around the spring believing it prevents the sheep scabs. However, detailed surveys showed that the water is actually cooler and has no needed chemical and bacteriological composition to be considered a healing one. In the end, the Naftagas company in 2020 completely shut down the flow of water and covered the water spring. In July 2023 the denizens again organized and began clearing the area and pools, arranging and restoring one of the pools and the surrounding area for public use in August.

== History ==
=== Name ===
Omoljica was mentioned for the first time in 1458 under the German name Mollwitz. The modern place name is a diminutive and means Little Homolje, due to the settlement of the Serbs from the Homolje region, across the Danube. Later German place name, Homolitz, is rendering of the Serbian name.

=== Origin ===
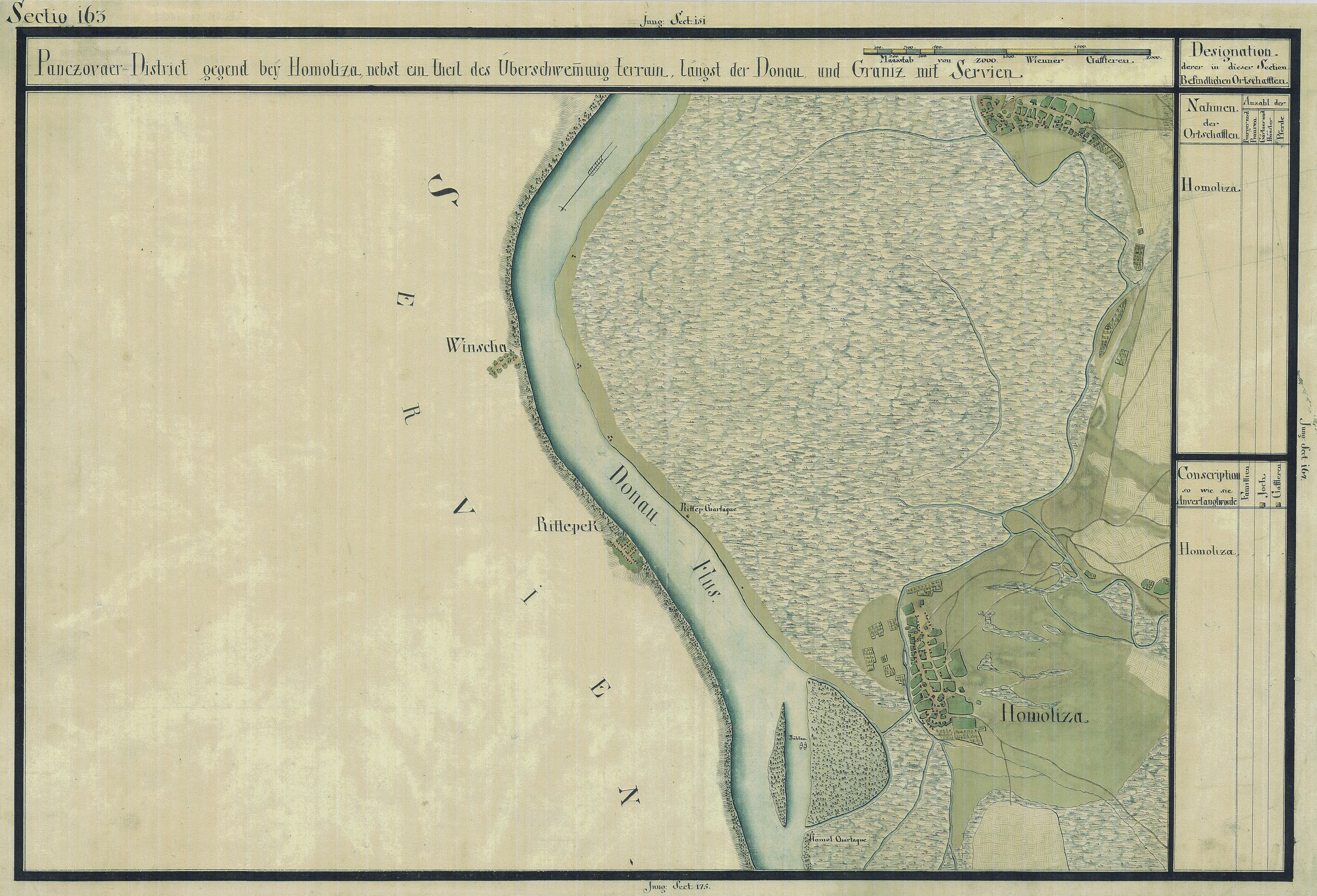
National Archives of Austria, Map of the Josephinian Land Survey (1769-1772)

Numerous artefacts from the Neolithic Starčevo culture have been unearthed around Omoljica. On the Danube's left bank, across Vinča on the right bank, there was a "royal town" Tornista, which was mentioned in 1437, but later disappeared from history. Its exact location is unknown. The village itself was mentioned for the first time in 1458 under the German name Mollwitz. This original settlement, which had only one street, was on a different location, on Danube's promontory close to Ivanovo. In the second half of the 18th century it was relocated to its present location, in the valley of the Ponjavica river.

After Omoljica was included in the Banat Military Frontier in 1764, Serbs began to settle the village, especially as the regular ferry line across the Danube to central Serbia, then under the Ottoman rule, was established. Around 1770, Germans from Alsace and Essen began to settle in Omoljica. In the 1788-1790 period, 334 Serbian families moved from Serbia to the village. By the late 18th century, Serbs from Croatia began to move in, while later Romanians and Romanies settled in Omoljica, too.

=== Early history ===
After the collapse of the First Serbian Uprising, in October 1813 a wave of Serbian refugees fled Serbia, crossing over the Danube and the Sava rivers into the southern parts of the Austrian Empire. There were 22 crossing points over the Danube in the Banat area, including one at Omoljica, named Homolitz in Austrian documents. There were also numerous refugee camps all over the southern Banat, and one was located in the village. In this camp, Serbian linguist and language reformer Vuk Karadžić found shelter, with his father and brother, before moving further to Vienna. There is a memorial table in the village, made of marble, commemorating his stay in Omoljica, which he called Halmalica in his writings.

As usual in this period, the camp had a quarantine hospital (konutmac) where hundreds of refugees were kept at times. Local Serbian population was bringing them food but Austrian soldiers were trying to prevent them, so there were clashes. Many died due to the harsh conditions and the marshy environment, and were left unburied as they had no money for the proper burial (3 shillings). In time, group by group, Austrian soldiers were dispatching Serbs further. Unlike Karadžić, majority of Serbs from Omoljica continued to Moldavia.

There is an impression of the old village which is recorded on the map of the Franciscan land survey from the early 19th century in the National Archives of Austria. In 1904, cadastral maps of the village were recorded which are located at the National Archives of Hungary.

=== Modern history ===
Omoljica was declared a municipal seat in 1899 of the Great Municipality of Omoljica, which meant that the local administration was allowed to organize fairs. It also got a post office and a telephone lines. The electricity reached Omoljica in 1911, before reaching Pančevo. This allowed for a cinema to be opened in 1912, only 17 years after the first movie projection by the brothers Lumière. The village was fully electrified by 1927.

In the late 1944, the headquarters of the Red Army, including general Vladimir Zhdanov, were seated in the village. After World War II, with the relocation of German population to Germany, the settlement became mostly inhabited by the Serbs and the Romanians, becoming mostly Orthodox. After the war, settling of the Serbs from central Serbia grew, mostly from the western regions of Azbukovica, Rađevina, Pocerina, Jadar, Mačva, and Posavina-Tamnava.

== Administration ==
Historical population
Year	Pop.	±%
1921	5,242	—
1931	5,172	−1.3%
1948	5,084	−1.7%
1953	5,026	−1.1%
1961	5,565	+10.7%
1971	5,693	+2.3%
1981	6,500	+14.2%
1991	6,782	+4.3%
2002	6,518	−3.9%
2011	6,309	−3.2%

The communal area was a part of Temeşvar Eyalet in Ottoman Empire since 1552, after the Treaty of Požarevac a part of Habsburg's Banat, since 1765 of the military frontier (Austrian Empire) and then it belonged to the Torontál county of Austria-Hungary. After World War I was that area a part of provisional Torontal-Timiș County (Treaty of Trianon), in 1922 of Belgrade oblast and since 1929 of the Danube Banovina in the Kingdom of Yugoslavia. In the time after World War II its belonged to the Srez Pančevo of the Socialist Federal Republic of Yugoslavia and the Federal Republic of Yugoslavia. The communal area of Omoljica was a part of the administrative region of the Pančevo municipality from all these centuries to the present.

== Characteristics ==
The village area is 7,590 hectares (18,800 acres). Omoljica is an agrarian settlement, of the Pannonian architectural type. From only one street when it was founded, it grew to 54 streets by the early 2000s. It is located on both sides of the Pančevo-Banatski Brestovac road. Since its foundation, it developed as a planned settlement, including newer general urban plans, like the one from 1988. However, bounded by the meandering courses of its rivers, Ponjavica and Nadela, it developed in an irregular shape. The village consists of three connected hamlets. The central hamlet is called Omoljica, and the other two are Slatina ("Salt Marsh") and Ivanovački Izlaz ("Ivanovo Exit").

The suburbs of Ivanovo along the Nadela's left bank, in the Detelište and (partially) Staro Selo localities, are actually administratively parts of Omoljica, so as the field localities of Trešnjara, Velike Livade, Stara Kapija, Salašine and Velika Kutina, directly to the south of Omoljica.

Despite being agricultural, almost the entire settlement is connected to the waterworks, which is 35 kilometres (22 mi) long. Omoljica has its local village administration seat, a health care center (first doctor came to the village in 1807), and a veterinarian clinic.

There is a Serbian Orthodox Church of the Saint Father Nikolay, built in 1772-1773. At the same time, a Roman Catholic church was also built. Both were soon demolished by the Ottomans, and the new ones, on original foundations, were built at the end of the 18th century. A Roman Catholic church was later demolished again in 1944. Romanian Orthodox church was built in 1872. The cemetery is located in the central western section, at the corner of the Vuka Karadžića and Tamiška streets.

== Economy ==
The major campany is the Agricultural Company Omoljica. It holds almost half of the villages total area, of which almost all is arable. There are also agricultural cooperatives, like Podrinje, and Budućnost (now part of AC Omoljica), and agricultural homestead "Ponjavica". Textile company "Omoljičanka" went bankrupt. The village also had a department store, and was well known for its artisans (locksmiths, barbers, butchers, bakers, tailors, turners). Former brickyard, one of the rare facilities located south of the Ponjavica, was closed.

== Culture ==
Since 1971, there is an annual amateur film festival named "Žisel", paired with the photography festival two years later. The name is coined from ži(vot) sel(a), Serbian for "life of the village" as it is dedicated to the subject. In time, the festival gained regional and international recognition, attracting even authors from Australia and the United States. As of 2017 it is the longest running village film festival in Serbia and the only one dealing with the subject of the country life. Since 2010, there is a cultural association named "Žisel" in the village.

There is an elementary school with kindergarten, "Dositej Obradović", which is a successor to the first school, founded in 1773. Omoljica also has a Culture Center, Serbian Singing Society "Venčac" (founded in 1903), Sports Society "Mladost" (established in 1924), and numerous cultural events which developed around "Žisel" (photo and paintings exhibitions, literary encounters, handrafting).
