= Ivanovo, Pančevo =

Ivanovo Иваново (Serbian) Иваново (Bulgarian) Sándoregyháza (Hungarian)
- Village (Selo)
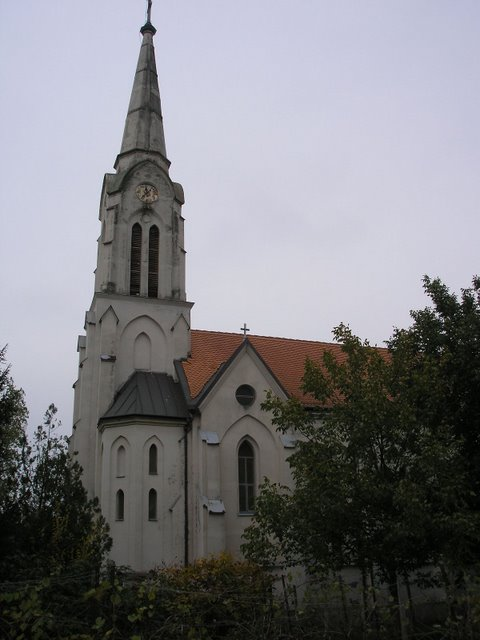
- Roman Catholic Church Saint Wendelin

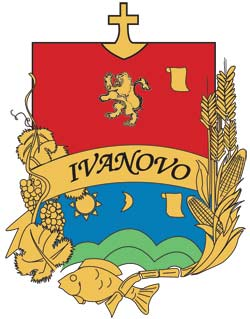
- Coat of arms

- Location of Ivanovo within Serbia Ivanovo (Serbia) Ivanovo (Europe)
- Coordinates: 44°44′11″N 20°42′03″E
- Country: Serbia
- Province: Vojvodina
- District: South Banat
- Municipalities: Pančevo
- Established: 1868

Area
  - Total: 42.57 km^{2} (16.44 sq mi)

Population (2022)
  - Total: 974
  - Density: 22.9/km^{2} (59.3/sq mi)
- Time zone: UTC+1 (CET)
  - Summer (DST): UTC+2 (CEST)
- Postal code: 26233
- Area code: +381(0)13
- Car plates: PA

Ivanovo (Serbian Cyrillic: Иваново; Hungarian: Sándoregyháza; Bulgarian: Иваново; German: Alexanderkirchen) is a village located in the Pančevo municipality, in the South Banat District of Vojvodina, Serbia. It has a population of 974 inhabitants.

== Name ==
The Serbian name of the village means Ivan's place of residence. According to a legend, a Bulgarian Paulician man called Ivan Guran was the first to make his home in the present day territory of the village. The Hungarian and German names of the village mean place of residence of Alexander's church. Both names refer to Bishop of Csanád, Sándor Bonnaz, who had a major role in funding the local church, which had been built between 1889 and 1899.

== Location ==
Ivanovo is located in the southern part of the Town of Pančevo, administrative unit in the South Banat District, and south of its administrative center, Pančevo itself. Village of Omoljica, also part of Pančevo, is just to the northwest, upstream the Nadela. Across the Danube is the village of Ritopek, in the municipality of Grocka, which is part of the City of Belgrade.

== Geography ==
Ivanovo is situated at the mouth of the channeled Nadela river into the Danube's arm of Dunavac. The village is situated among the floodplains of the Danube: Ponjavica on the east, which has been declared a nature park, and Ivanovačko Ostrvo, on the south, which has been declared a natural monument. Ivanovačko ostrvo occupies the river island (ada) of Ivanovo, just south of the village, which has been formed by the Nadela, Dunavac and Danube, at its 1,137 km (706 mi). The area is the remaining patch of once vast flooded forests of Podunavlje. River and canal banks are inhabited by the relics Pančić's frog grass (Senecio pancicii) and wild grape vine (Vitis vinifera subsp. sylvestris).

The village is almost from all sides encircled by the rivers and canals (Veliki kanal, etc.), giving an island feel. The section along the Dunavac and the Danube itself is protected by an embankment, which protects the village as it is located 5 metres (16 ft) below the Danube's level.

Ivanovo is located in the vast Banat plain, surrounded by the pastures and the groves of poplar and black locust. Along the village, the avenues of walnut trees and lindens are planted.

The waters around the village are a natural spawning area of common carp, so the fishing is quite developed, though mostly a recreational one. The surrounding floodplains are inhabited by storks, herons, swans, geese and ducks. Protected white-tailed eagle nests in the area.

== History ==
The village was founded in 1868, and it is the youngest settlement of this administrative area. It was first settled by Banat Bulgarians (Paulicians), and fifteen years later by Germans and Hungarian (Székelys of Bukovina).

Ivanovo is founded in connection with the communal works which were planned for the area. They included the vast melioration, mostly draining of the floodplains in order to obtain arable land. Other project was prevention of the flooding and construction of the embankment along the Danube's bank.

The settlement was a part of Habsburg's military frontier (Austrian Empire) since its founding, then it belonged to the Torontál county of Austria-Hungary. After World War I, that area was a part of provisional Torontalsko-tamiške županja (Treaty of Trianon), in 1922 of Belgrade oblast and since 1929 of the Danube Banovina in the Kingdom of Yugoslavia. In the time after World War II its belonged to the Srez Pančevo of the Socialist Federal Republic of Yugoslavia and of the Federal Republic of Yugoslavia. The communal area of Ivanovo was a part of the municipal region of Pančevo from all these centuries to the present.

In 1944, Red Army troops which participated in the final expulsion of the German occupational forces from Serbia were stationed in and around Ivanovo, including Marshal Fyodor Tolbukhin.

In 2010s, families from Belgrade and Pančevo began buying old houses and renovating them into the summer houses so Ivanovo serves as an air spa and excursion place for the population of the nearby polluted cities. Unlike other rural areas in Vojvodina and central Serbia, where village houses and estates were sold for severely reduced prices since the 2000s, the real estate prices in Ivanovo remained high, despite the village, being at the ending part of the road, has been described as "appendix" of Pančevo.

== Characteristics ==
Though fairly small, the village has cultural venues, elementary school founded in 1888 and today named "Moša Pijade", community health center and post office. There is a Roman Catholic church in Ivanovo, dedicated to Wendelin of Trier, and in 2018 it was announced that an Orthodox church will be built, too.

In the center of the village, a cannon was put on display. The cannon was used by the Red Army during the 1944 to expel the Germans.

== Demography ==
Historical population
Year	Pop.	±% p.a.
1921	2,271	—
1931	2,299	+0.12%
1948	2,169	−0.34%
1953	2,196	+0.25%
1961	2,066	−0.76%
1971	1,893	−0.87%
1981	1,947	+0.28%
1991	1,439	−2.98%
2002	1,131	−2.17%
2011	1,053	−0.79%

Year	Total	Hungarians	Banat Bulgarians	Germans	Serbs	Other nationalities
1880	724	8.14%	64.36%	22.23%		5.27%
1910	2,530	51.93%	30.15%	16.75%	0.51%	0.66%
1948	2,169	61.31%	34.80%	0.46%	1.56%	1.87%
2002	1,131	39.96%	27.14%	0.35%	19.71%	12.84%

== Economy ==
Prior to World War II, the arm of the Danube served as a winter shelter (zimovnik) for ships during the harsh winters when the river would freeze, and as an occasional port. Until some time after the war, there was a regular ferry service to Ritopek, across the Danube. A buttons factory "Inga" was operational from 1948 to 1962. The entry section into the Dunavac arm still serves as the winter shelter.

In the 21st century, the settlement is almost completely agricultural, while a number of denizens is employed in Pančevo. Due to the meadows which surround it, and the groves of black locust, the area is suitable for beekeeping. Fruit growing is also developed.

In the center of the village there is a restaurant, today called Bife Aurelija, which has been working since 1870.

Apart from the road which connects it to Omoljica, across the bridge over Nadela, Ivanovo can be reached from Ritopek, via a seasonal ferry, through the Dunavac arm.

== Culture ==
In 2001, local Bulgarian people have formed the cultural association Ivanovo 1868. There is also a Hungarian cultural-artistic association "Bonnaz Sándor" which has an ethno-house.

Numerous festivities are held in the local cultural venue, including the annual international salon of art photography, founded in 2007. Photo-safari is also organized annually, so as the "Golden Accordion" festival. Organizers of the photography festival and safari are the cultural center "Žarko Zrenjanin" and the photo-group "Dunavac".

In all of Serbia, the traditional shepherd's game called popika survived today only in Ivanovo. The old, contest-type game is played on grassy fields, somewhat resembles baseball, and the players are divided into "servants" and "masters". The origin is unknown and both the Bulgarians and the Hungarians claim it.

== Gallery ==
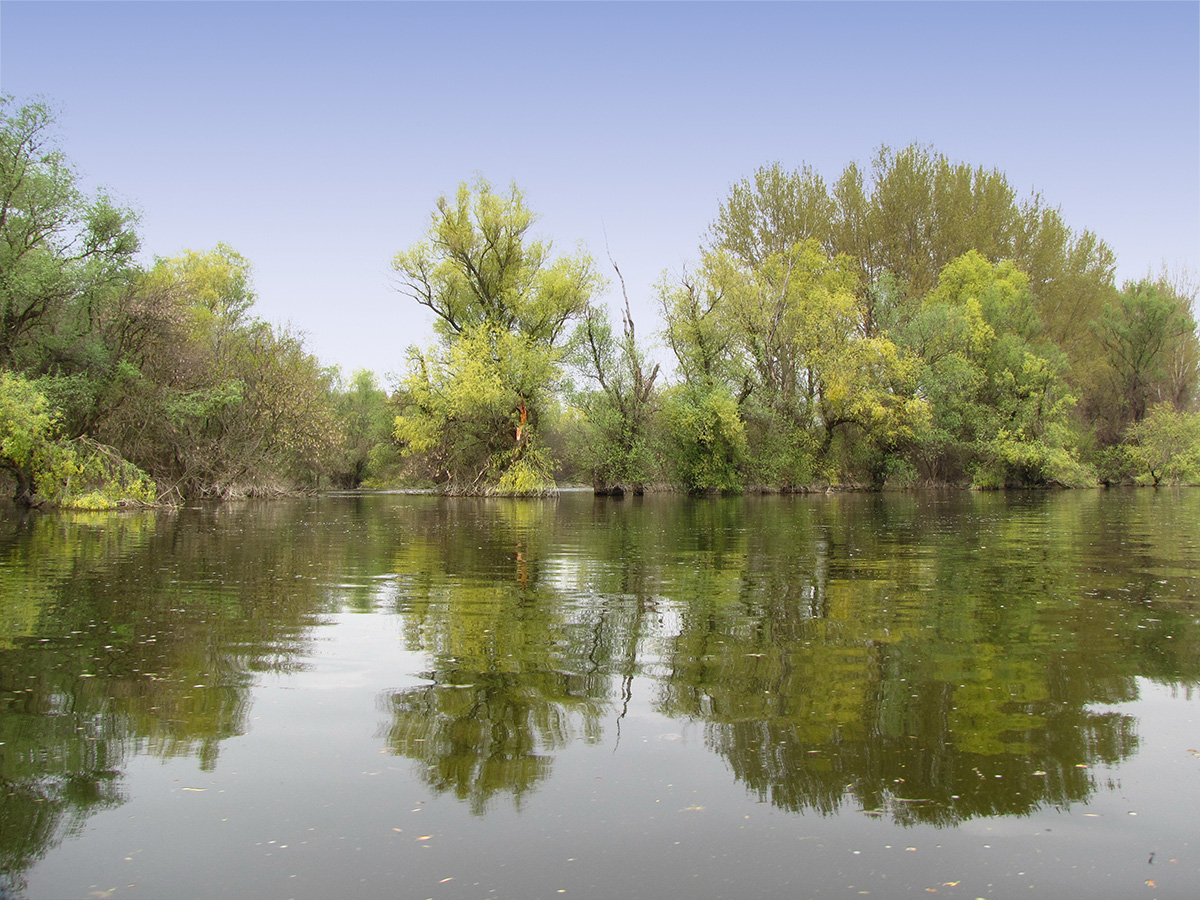
Impression of the floodplains

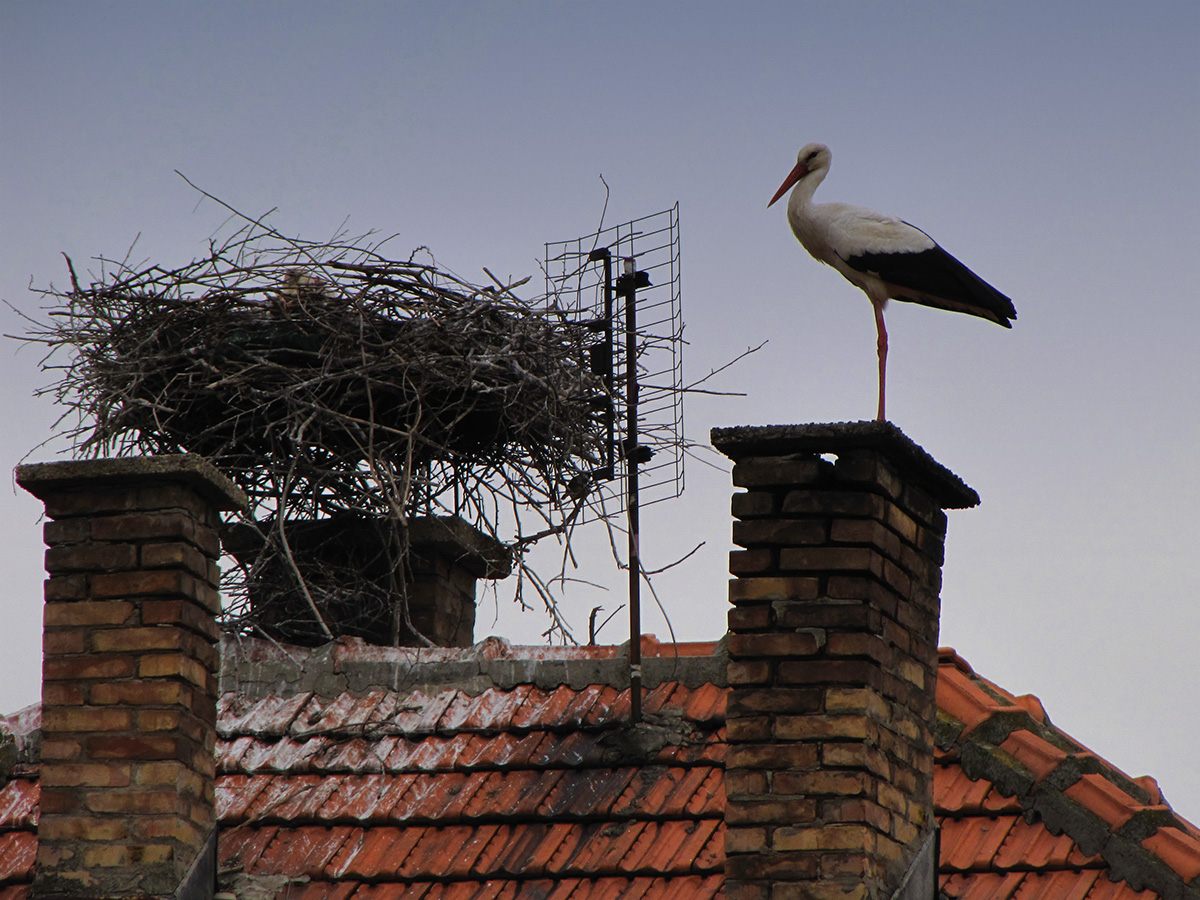
A stork's nest on the roof of a house

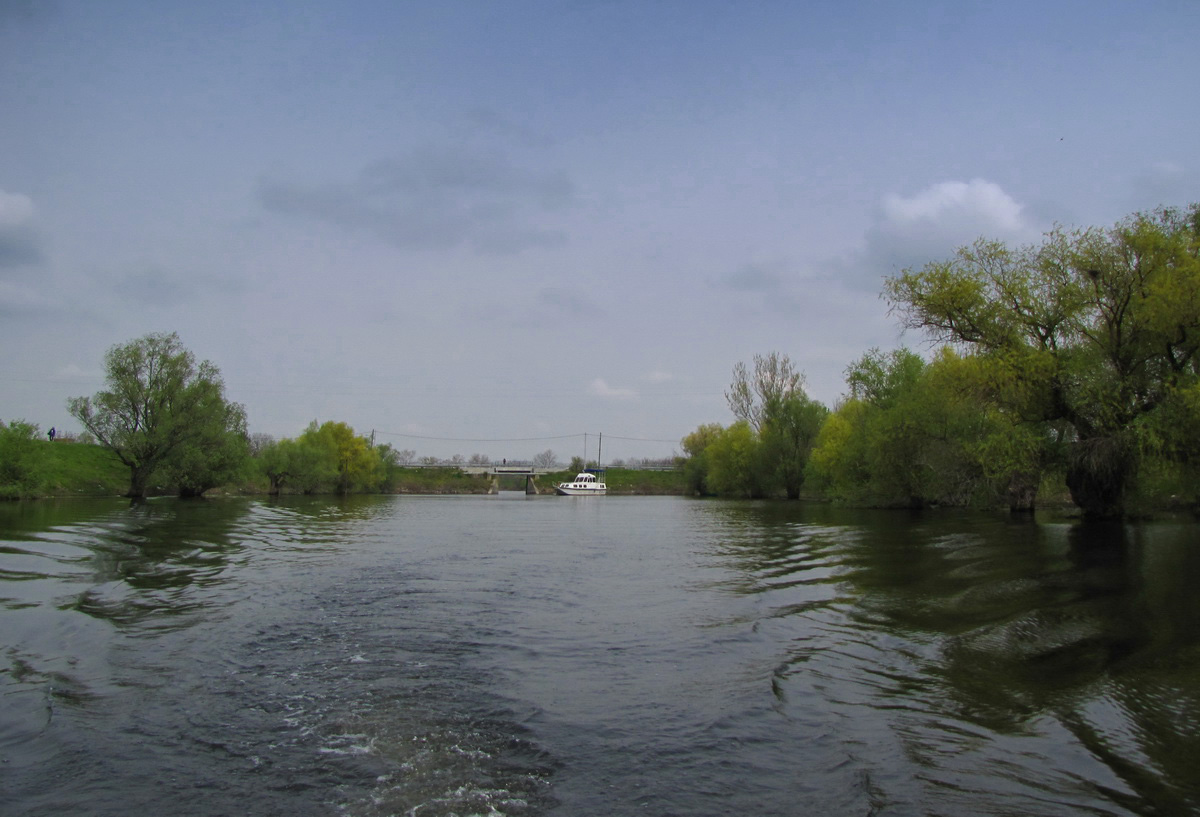
The mouth of the Nadela into the Danube

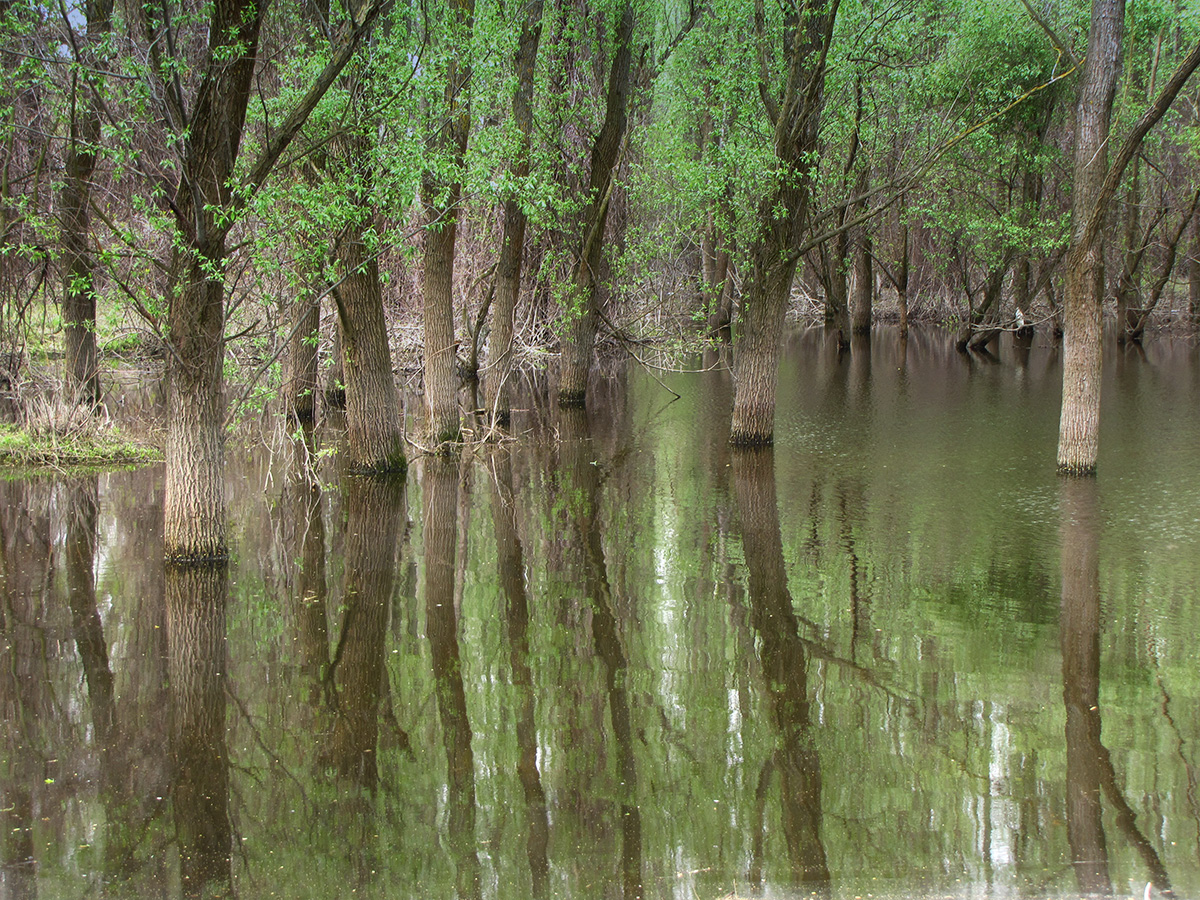
Flooded forest

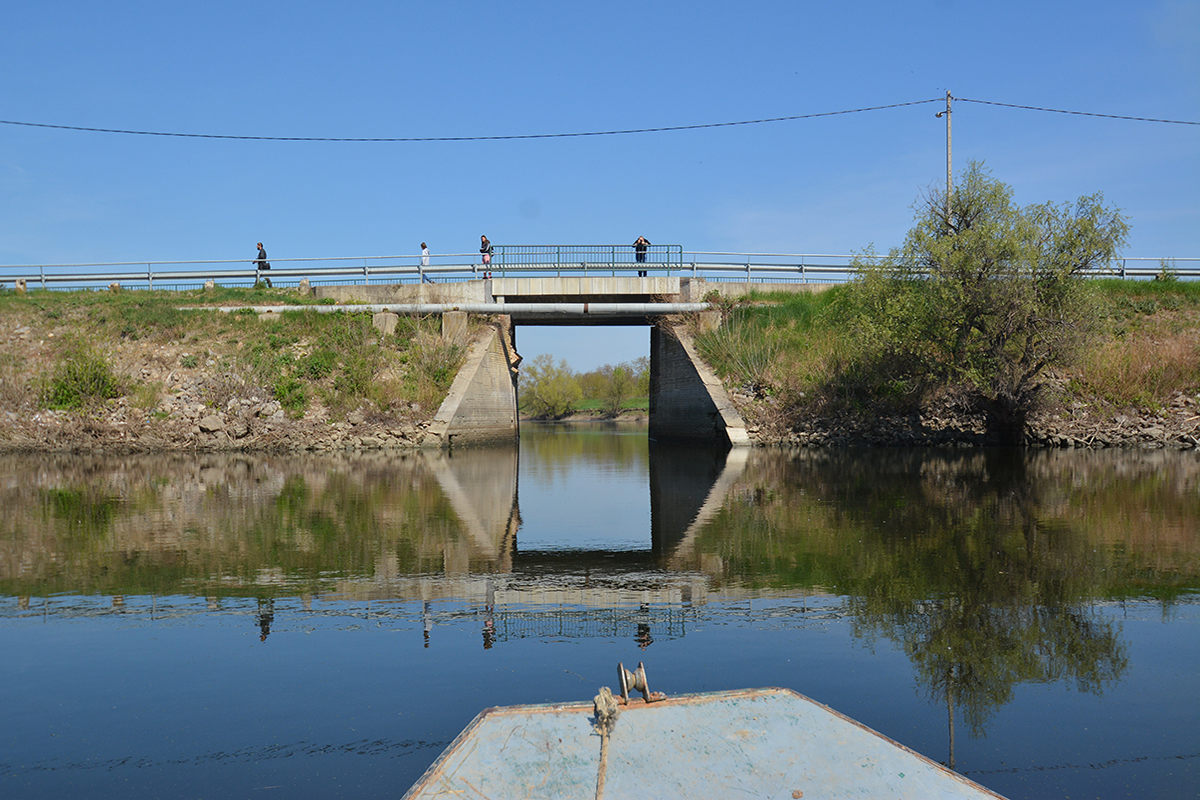
Bridge across the Dunavac

== See also ==
- List of cities, towns and villages in Vojvodina
- List of places in Serbia

== Sources ==
- Samu Borovszky, Magyarország vármegyéi és városai. Torontal vármegye, Budapest 1912.
