= Karl Joseph von Simbschen =

- Died: 1763
- Military career
- Allegiance: (Habsburg monarchy) Habsburg Austria
- Branch: Infantry
- Service years: 1744–63
- Rank: major, obristlieutenant, oberst, feldmarschall-leutnant
- Units: Temes Battalion (1744–45); Banat Land Militia (1746–53); Pandur Battalion (1753–63)
- Conflicts: Austro-Turkish War (1737–39); Austrian Succession (1740–48); Seven Years' War (1756–63)

Karl Joseph von Simbschen (fl. 1746–d. 1763) or Josef Carl was an Austrian military commander that reached the rank of feldmarschall-leutnant. He commanded Military Frontier battalions in the areas of present-day Serbia and Croatia.

== Career ==
=== Temes Battalion ===
Simbschen was the commandant, while ranked major, of the "Temesvárer Frei-Bataillon" volunteer unit (fl. 1744–45) established by the knezes in the Banat of Temeswar. It saw action in the War of the Austrian Succession and was dissolved after the Treaty of Dresden (December 1745). A part of that unit joined to form the Banat Land Militia.

=== Banat Land Militia ===
In 1744–47 Engelshofen organized the Banat Land Militia (Banater Landmiliz), a continuation of the Militia (Banater Miliz) of the Banat of Temeswar organized by graf de Mercy in 1724, led by Serbian veterans. The ober-knezes (chief community headmans) of the Banat had, in sign of loyalty to Maria Theresa, raised a freikorps (volunteer unit) on their own expense that numbered 700 infantry and 106 Hussars, mostly ethnic Serbs. This volunteer unit was transformed into the Banat Land Militia (also called Landesbataillon), put under the command of hauptmann and obristlieutenant Simbschen. The Banat Military Frontier was established in 1751, and by 1752 the Land Militia had 1841 men.

=== Infantry Regiment ===
In 1753 Simbschen was the commander of a Pandur Corps (commandant des Pandurencorps) called the "Slavonian Pandur Battalion" (Slavonisches Panduren-Bataillon). He had the rank of oberst at the time. This unit was peacetime-stationed at Freiberg in Silesia in 1751. In 1755 the unit was peacetime-stationed in Fulnek. The Pandur Battalion recruited from Trenck's Pandurs, from Slavonia and Syrmia. In 1756 this Battalion was transformed into a regular Infantry Regiment (later given the number 53rd in 1769) put under Simbschen as Inhaber, called the "Linien-Infanterie-Regiment", made up of 16 fusilier- and two grenadier companies. This was made according to a patent (decree) issued on 8 September 1756. It was peacetime-stationed in Troppau in 1756. The Regiment recruited from the Bács Comitat and Serbian villages in the Banat, mostly the area of southern Banat.

In 1758, Anton von Calveria was the commander of the "Linien-Infanterie-Regiment" under Simbschen. Simbschen was elevated to feldmarschall-leutnant. He was succeeded as Inhaber of the "Linien-Infanterie-Regiment" by Philipp Levin von Beck in 1763.

His son Joseph Anton von Simbschen (1746–1820) was also an Austrian general.

== Sources ==
- Ilić-Mandić, Jelena (2020). "The Local Elite in Central Government Service: Banat Military Frontier Officers in the 18th Century". The Habsburg State-wide and the regions in the Southern Danube basin (16th-20th centuries). Wien: New academic press. pp. 99–121.
- Vaníček, Fr (1875). Specialgeschichte der Militärgrenze: aus Originalquellen und Quellenwerken geschöpft. Aus der Kaiserlich-Königlichen Hof- und Staatsdruckerei.
- Wrede, Alphons von (1898a). Geschichte der K. und K. Wehrmacht. Vol. 1. L. W. Seidel.
- Wrede, Alphons von (1898b). Geschichte der K. und K. Wehrmacht. Vol. 2. L. W. Seidel.

Military offices
Preceded by First	Inhaber of "Linien-Infanterie-Regiment"; 1756–63	Succeeded by Beck
