= Nadela =

System of rivers and canals in Serbia

Nadela (Надела)
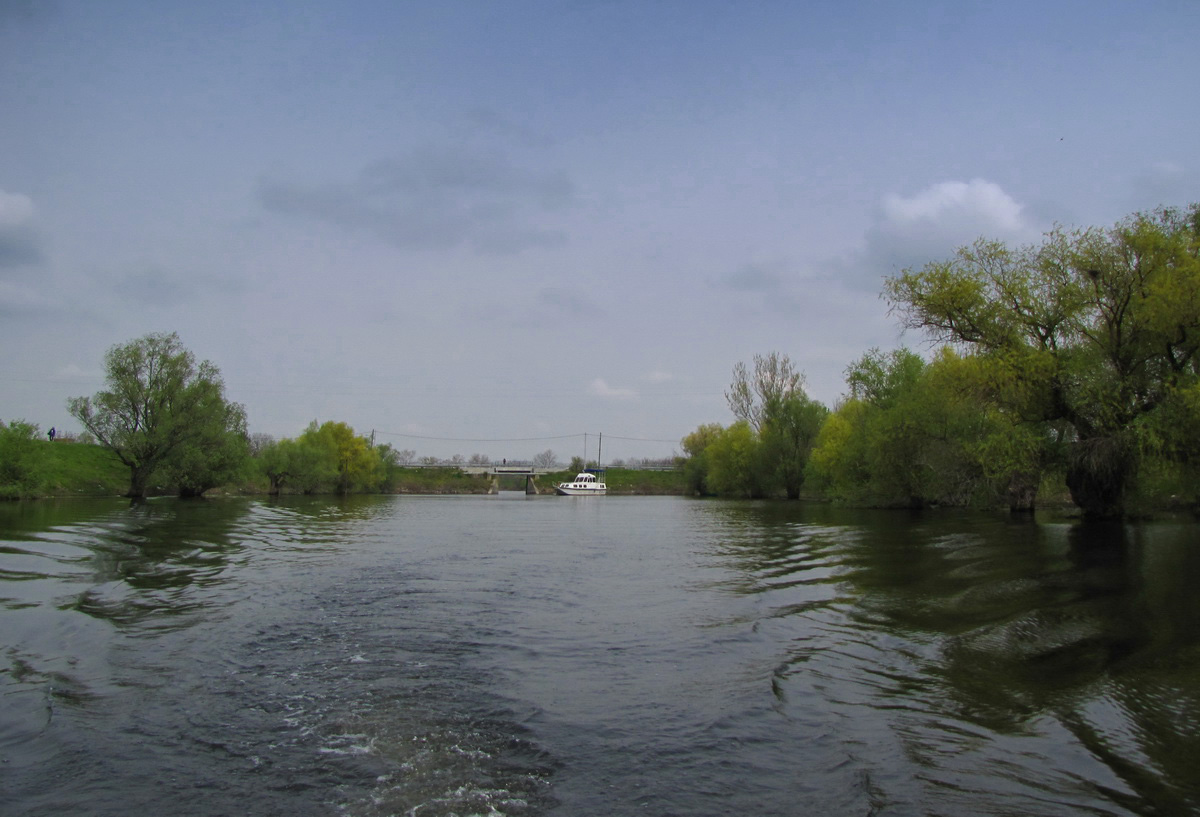
- Nadela at Ivanovo

Location
- Country: Serbia

Physical characteristics
- Source
  - location: Canal Danube-Tisa-Danube, at Botoš, Vojvodina
- Mouth
  - location: Danube, at Ivanovo, Vojvodina
  - coordinates: 44.707965°N 20.701560°E
- Length: 81 or 84 km (50 or 52 mi)

Basin features
- Progression: Danube→ Black Sea

Nadela (Serbian Cyrillic: Надела) or Nadel (Serbian Cyrillic: Надел) is a water canal in Vojvodina, an 84 km (52 mi) long left tributary to the Danube in the Banat region of Vojvodina. Originally a river, the course was reconstructed as a canal in the 1970s and 1980s. Originating from Botoš, it flows south and ends at the village of Ivanovo, near Pančevo. The river has been polluted for decades and was home to carps as well as various other fish. However, the river is still used by fishermen and by 2025, fish had returned in the area near Starčevo.

== Course ==
Nadela at Ivanovo in 2025

Nadel, officially known as Nadela, is a system of canals and rivers that flows for about 81 or 84 km. It is also described as a Banat river in the alluvial plain of the Danube, alongside Ponjavica. Originally a river, the original course was reconstructed as a canal, to be used for irrigation and industrial water supply. The construction most likely occurred between 1977 and 1988. It originates from Botoš, on the Canal Danube-Tisa-Danube, and is present in Eastern Vojvodina. Its direction is towards the south and passes through the settlements of Crepaja, Jabuka, Pančevo, Starčevo, Omoljica, and Ivanovo, ending in the Danube, at the village of Ivanovo, near Pančevo. There it creates the Ivanovo Ostrvo. Between Botoš and a pumping station in Debeljača, which is about 30 km, it irrigates more intensively. At Tomaševac, there is a pumping station that raises water from below the Kaljov canal, which is connected to the Danube–Tisa–Danube Canal and originates at Botoš, into Nadela. Nadela is joined by several small watercourses and canals along the way, such as Verovac, Dolovački Begej, Crepajski Canal, Srednji Begej, Ponjavica, Zeldo, and Naritak. The bicycle route EuroVelo 6 passes near Nadela.

== Hydrology ==
Along its course, there are three pumping stations and 10 weirs. During the first 30 km, the water is considered clean and is used for irrigation, while at the final 15 km (49,000 ft), there is uncontrolled pollution. The pollution of Nadela has been ongoing for decades, mostly done by nearby factories and pig farming operators. An illegal dump site was also formerly present in the area. The two main polluters include the grain processing plant Jabuka, which injects around 7,200 m^{3} of waste water per year, while the factories PIK Tamiš and DD Mlekara eject around 103,500 m^{3} of waste water per year. In 2006, the University of Novi Sad conducted a study where it was found that near the Skrobara factory there were little amounts of dissolved oxygen. There were also several heavy metals present, such as arsenic and mercury.

== Geology ==
Nadela lies on three geomorphological units, a loess plateau, a transition zone, and a loess terrace. The altitude of the loess terrace is about 80 m, which covers about 48,214 ha, while the altitude of the transition zone is between 80 m (260 ft) and 100 m (330 ft) and covers around 28,829 ha (71,240 acres). The loess plateau's altitude is between 100 and 150 m and occupies an area of 50 ha (120 acres). Nadela is a natural depression whose depth is around 6 m (20 ft), while near Kovačica it is 3 m (9.8 ft). It flows through terrain composed of loess-like sediments. The nearby Tamiš river, which is also a Danube tributary, has silty sediments, meanders laterally, while also eroding loess plateaus and terraces. Like Nadela, Tamiš is also polluted by factories and agriculture.

Along the left bank of Nadela near Starčevo, there are 18 registered burial mounds from the Eneolithic (Chalcolithic) Period, about 6500 BC to 3000 BC. Between Jabuka and Glogonj, a village near Tamiš, an Iron Age settlement was found.

== Biology ==
An European bee-eater at Ponjavica, which connects to Nadela

Nadela is home to carps (such as the Prussian carp) and common rudds, though they have mostly disappeared due to the pollution. Swans can also be found. Protected bird species were also present around Nadela, such as a rare type of a Southern festoon. Nadela has lush vegetation. Until the 1970s, Nadela was also home to fish such as tenches, perches, crucian carps, pikes, and catfishes, as well as birds such as herons, storks, and jackdaws. Near its ending, two nature reserves are located in Ivanovo and Omoljica. Ponjavica, a Nadela tributary, is a protected nature park.

== History ==
A 1914 map showcasing Pančevo, with Nadela passing next to it

According to the Serbian Encyclopedia, it is believed that the Battle of Nedao took place near Nadela.

Nadela is commonly used by fishermen and there is a recreational fishing club named after the canal in Starčevo. Then-president of the club, Dalibor Tanev, in an interview for the Politika newspaper complained about pollution that was spotted in the canal in January 2017, which left most fish dead. With the help of a local water management company, the river bank and a bridge near Omoljica and Starčevo were cleaned up and tons of garbage was hauled away since the establishment of the club in 2016. Recreational fishermen have called for the Nadela region to be proclaimed a nature park. Since then, ecologists have developed and cleaned up the area near the canal, though polluters are still present. According to a 2025 article by the newspaper Pančevac, the situation around Starčevo was improved and fish have since returned to the area. However, the fishing club had de facto ceased to exist.

== Sources ==
- Glasnik Muzeja Banata [Bulletin of the Banat Museum] (in Serbian), Pančevo Museum, 2015
  - Jakšić, Petar. "Prikaz izložbe "Srednji Banat u Velikom ratu"". In Pančevo Museum (2015), pp. 224–230.
- Belić, Sima S.; Savić, Radovan B.; Belić, Anđelka M. (2003). "Uticaj aktivnosti u slivu na promenu kvaliteta voda Nadele" [The impact of activities in the watershed on the change in water quality of Nadela]. Letopis naučnih radova Poljoprivrednog fakulteta (in Serbian). 27 (1): 169–176.
- Dalmacija, Božo (April 2009), Strategija vodosnabdevanja i zaštite voda u AP Vojvodini [Water supply and water protection strategy in AP Vojvodina] (in Serbian), University of Novi Sad
- Kašanin-Grubin, Milica; Gajić, Violeta; Veselinović, Gorica; Stojadinović, Sanja; Antić, Nevena; Štrbac, Snežana (28 September 2023). "Provenance and Pollution Status of River Sediments in the Danube Watershed in Serbia". Water. 15 (19): 3406. Bibcode:2023Water..15.3406K. doi:10.3390/w15193406.
- Kljajić, Nataša; Vuković, Predrag; Roljević, Svetlana (2011). "Hidrološki, pedološki i mikroklimatski potencijali teritorije Pančeva u funkciji poljoprivrede" [Hydrological, pedological and microclimatic potentials of the territory of Pančevo in the function of agriculture]. Ekonomika Poljoprivrede (in Serbian). 58 (3): 503–524.
- Majkić, Brankica; Prohaska, Stevan (2007), Ecological Status of the Nadela River Catchment Area in Accordance with the Water Framework Directive (2000/60/EC), Istanbul University
- Popović, Marko; Tasić, Nikola, eds. (1989), Glasnik 5, The Journal of the Serbian Archaeological Society, ISSN 0352-5678
  - Batistić-Popadić, Daria. "The Field Survey of the Glogonj Area, the Later Iron Age Locality". In Popović & Tasić (1989), pp. 164–166.
- Srđević, Bojan (2006). "LP, AHP i sinergija u alokaciji vodoprivrednih budžeta" [LP, AHP, and synergy in the allocation of water management budgets]. Vodoprivreda (in Serbian). 38: 85–95.
- Srđević, Zorica; Srđević, Bojan; Melo, Paulo; Jorge, Luísa (1 December 2019). "Conflicts and resolutions in managing water allocation at the watershed scale". Die Bodenkultur: Journal of Land Management, Food and Environment. 70 (3): 161–170. doi:10.2478/boku-2019-0014. hdl:10198/21636.
- Srđević, Bojan; Melo, Paulo; Srđević, Zorica; Jorge, Luisa; Zoranović, Tihomir (2019). Water allocation for agricultural users based on multi criteria analysis and use of decision-making tools (Conference paper). University of Zagreb. pp. 117–125.
