= Banat Military Frontier =

- District of the Military Frontier, Habsburg monarchy
- 1751–1873
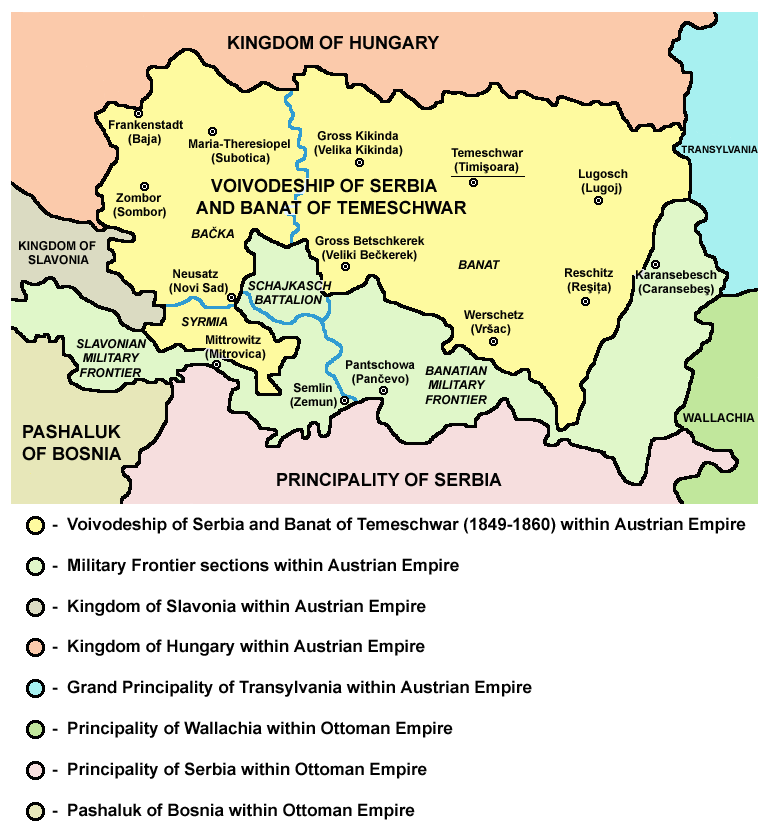
- 1849–60 political map
- History
  - Established: 1751
  - Disestablished: 1873
Preceded by	Succeeded by
Banat of Temeswar	Lands of the Crown of Saint Stephen
- Today part of: Hungary; Serbia; Romania

The Banat Military Frontier (German: Banater Militärgrenze, Romanian: granița militară bănăţeană) or simply Banat Frontier (Serbian: Банатска крајина/Banatska krajina) was a district of the Habsburg monarchy's Military Frontier during the 18th and 19th centuries. It was located in southern parts of the Banat region. It was formed in 1751, out of territories of the Banat of Temeswar. Today, the territory is split between Serbia and Romania.

== Geography ==
The Frontier was divided into Serb (Illyrian), German (Danube Swabian) and Romanian (Vlach) sections. It included parts of modern-day Banat and the south-eastern part of Bačka region, known as Šajkaška. Some of the important cities and places were: Pančevo, Bela Crkva, Titel, Žabalj, Alibunar, Kovin, and Caransebeş.

== History ==
The Ottomans conquered the region of Banat in 1552 and established the Temeşvar Eyalet. It was at the time populated by numerous Serbian settlements. The wars and floodings depopulated the region, and the Ottoman authorities did not manage the land as previously, leading to creation of vast marshlands and swamps, and scattered settlements. The Habsburgs liberated the Banat region in 1718 with victory in the Austro-Turkish War (1716–1718), and established a military frontier province called the Banat of Temeswar. The region was repopulated. In 1751, Maria Theresa introduced a civil administration for the northern part of the province while the southern part remained under military administration and was organized as the Banat Military Frontier. The abolition of the Tisa-Mureș Military Frontier in 1750–51 led to increased settlement, with the Serb Frontiersmen of the Tisa-Mureș, fearing loss of status and subjugation to the Hungarian nobility, began migrating to Russia and other Habsburg frontier areas, such as Banat where they became part of the Banat Militia. Also, Serbs from the Bačka region also settled in Banat and established settlements. With the abolition of the Banat Militia in 1773, Serbs in central Banat established the Velikokikinda District in 1774 with Imperial consent, an area independent of civil and military administration.

In 1849, this part of the Military Frontier bordered the Principality of Serbia to the south, Voivodeship of Serbia and Banat of Temeschwar to the north, Transylvania and Wallachia to the east, and the Slavonian Military Frontier to the west. It remained a part of the Habsburg Military Frontier until it was abolished in 1871/1872. The Banat Military Frontier was dissolved in these years, not without the resentment of sections of the population who feared the loss of their privileges. It can be assumed, however, that many inhabitants of the frontier region suffered under the strict regime of the military administration introduced after the Hungarian Revolution of 1848. Thus, the region’s special military criminal law opened the door wide to arbitrary and swift court judgments; moreover, petitions were permitted only in oral form. There were no fines as milder forms of punishment—only imprisonment and corporal punishment. Once judgment had been passed, the delinquent was immediately led away by a patrol. Prison sentences or death sentences, however, had to be confirmed by the Ministry of War in Vienna. Despite the military penal code, the judges of the municipalities were elected by the population. In order to dissolve the frontier regiment, Emperor Franz Joseph I. personally traveled to Weisskirchen, accompanied by Counts Menyhért Lónyay and Gedeon Ráday, as well as Ferenc Deák and Zsigmond Ormós, where he was received by the royal commissioner Baron Anton von Scudier. The background to this royal appearance appears to have been resistance within the circles of frontier officers against the enforcement of the decree of dissolution. At the very least, Franz Joseph I. had heard that the population of the frontier region opposed the dissolution of the Military Frontier, which is why he wished to make contact with them. Consequently, the officers even intended to persuade the Serbian population to present a larger deputation before the monarch in order to prevent the plan. Against this background, Scudier helped himself by sending a deputation of 24 farmers from Karlsdorf. It was headed by the judge appointed in Karlsdorf, Mathias Schneider, who was later to be awarded the “Cross of Merit (Austria-Hungary)” by the Emperor for his commitment in this matter. When the deputation set out for the Emperor’s place of residence, emotional scenes are said to have occurred. At the Powder Tower of the town of Weisskirchen, 30–40 officers had taken up positions in order, if necessary, to stop the deputation of Banat Swabians by force. The general in command of the military forced Schneider to dismount from the carriage and urgently demanded that the judge advocate for the continued existence of the Military Frontier. The demand was underscored by the threat that otherwise “blood would flow for blood.” After listening to the general, Schneider is said, according to tradition, to have replied: “No! Military rule must come to an end!” This evidently made an impression, and the general is said to have thrown his plumed hat to the ground, allowing the deputation to pass unhindered despite the officers preparing for combat. In front of the Weisskirchen town hall, where a large crowd had already gathered, the public proclamation of the dissolution of the Military Frontier could now be successfully carried out, with Mathias Schneider delivering a speech in dialogue with the Emperor. Scudier was then entrusted with winding up the Military Frontier: he retired or transferred the officers, collected the weapons of the frontiersmen, and abolished the military administration. The regiments were dissolved in November 1872, and their regimental districts were assigned to the replacement districts of Infantry Regiments No. 29 (district command in Groß-Betschkerek), No. 61 (district command in Temesvár), and No. 43 (district command in Karansebesch).

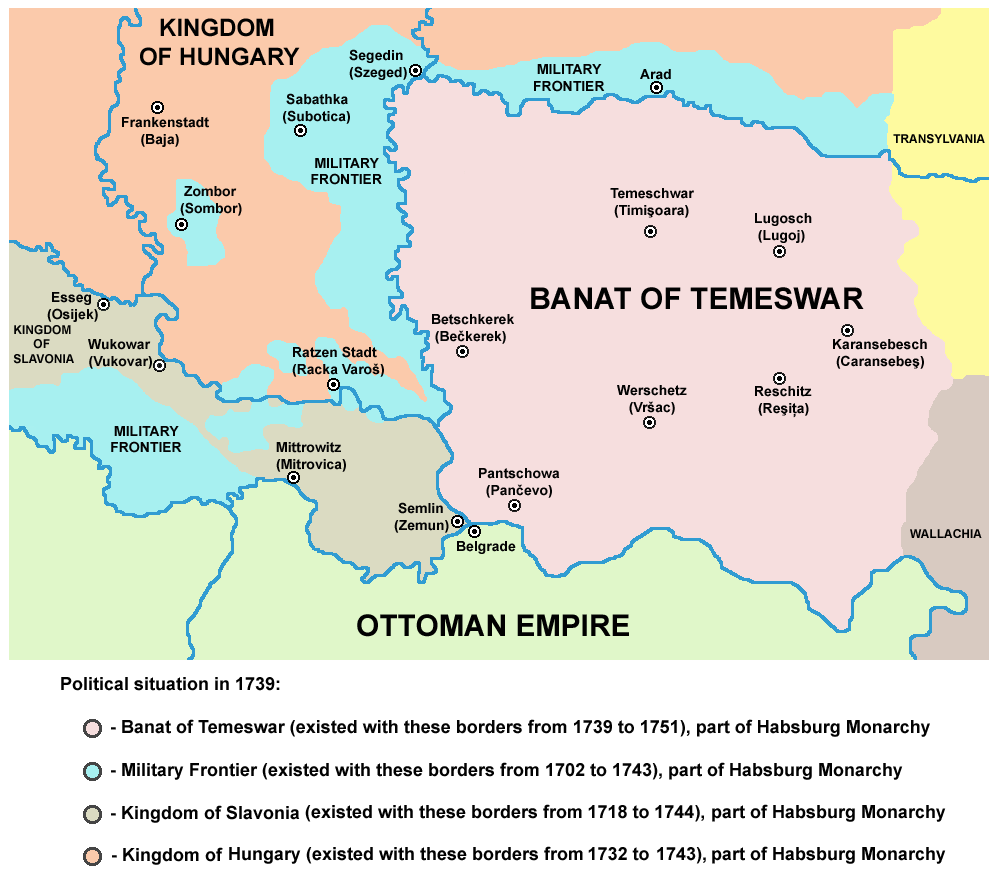
Map of Military Frontier sections in Syrmia, Bačka, and Pomorišje in 1718–44

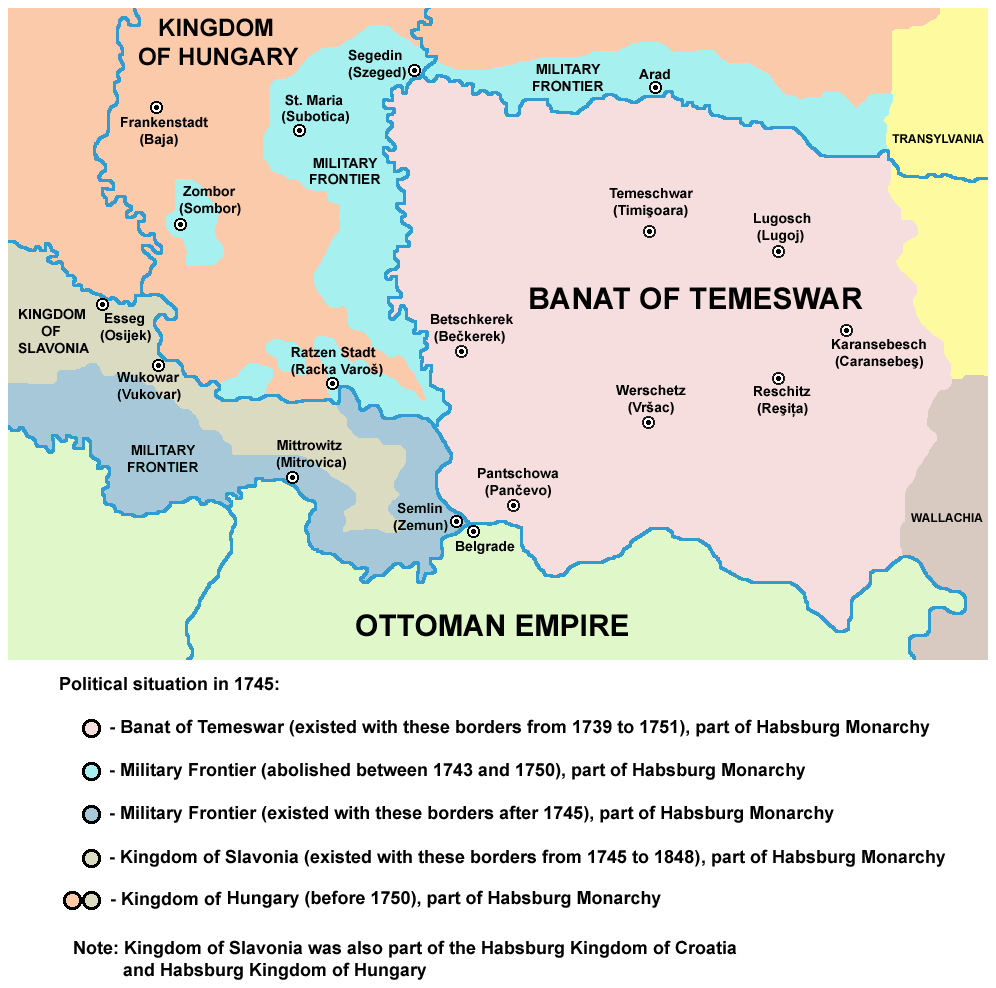
Map of Military Frontier sections in Syrmia, Bačka, and Pomorišje in 1744–50

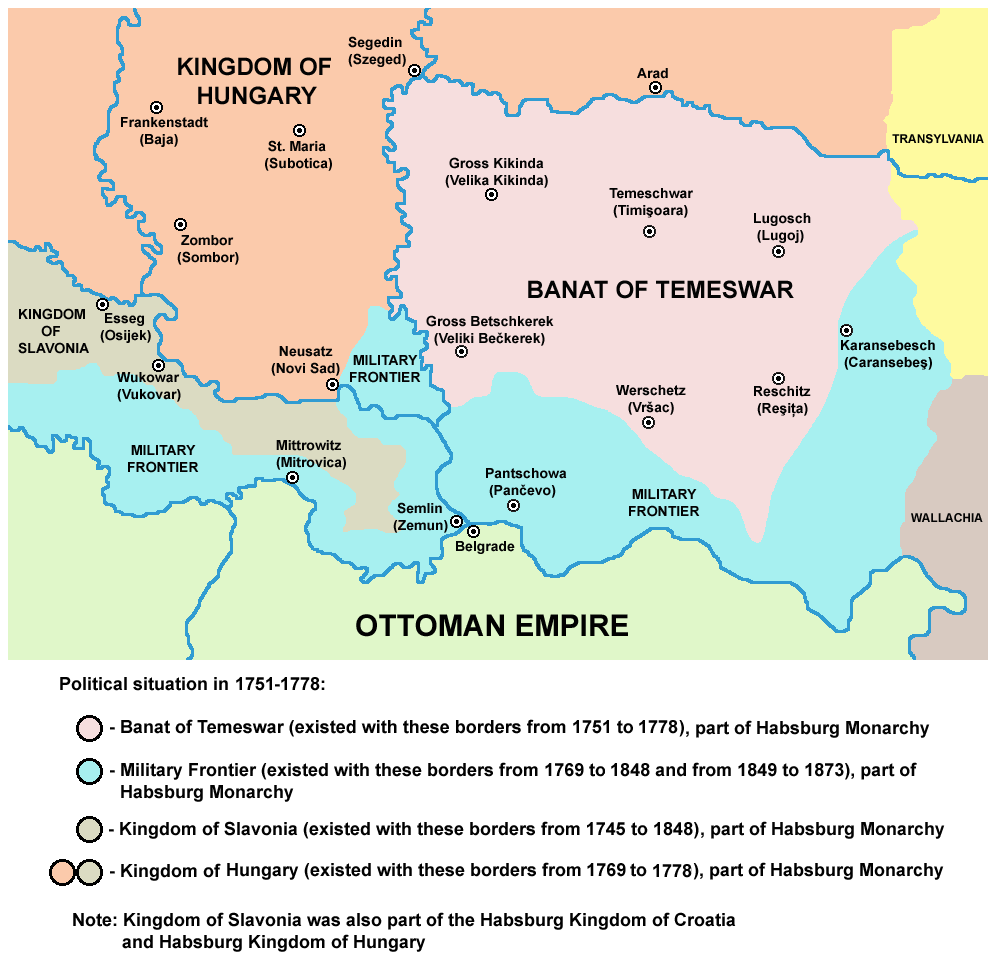
Map of Military Frontier sections in Syrmia, Bačka, and Banat in 1751–1778

== Administration ==
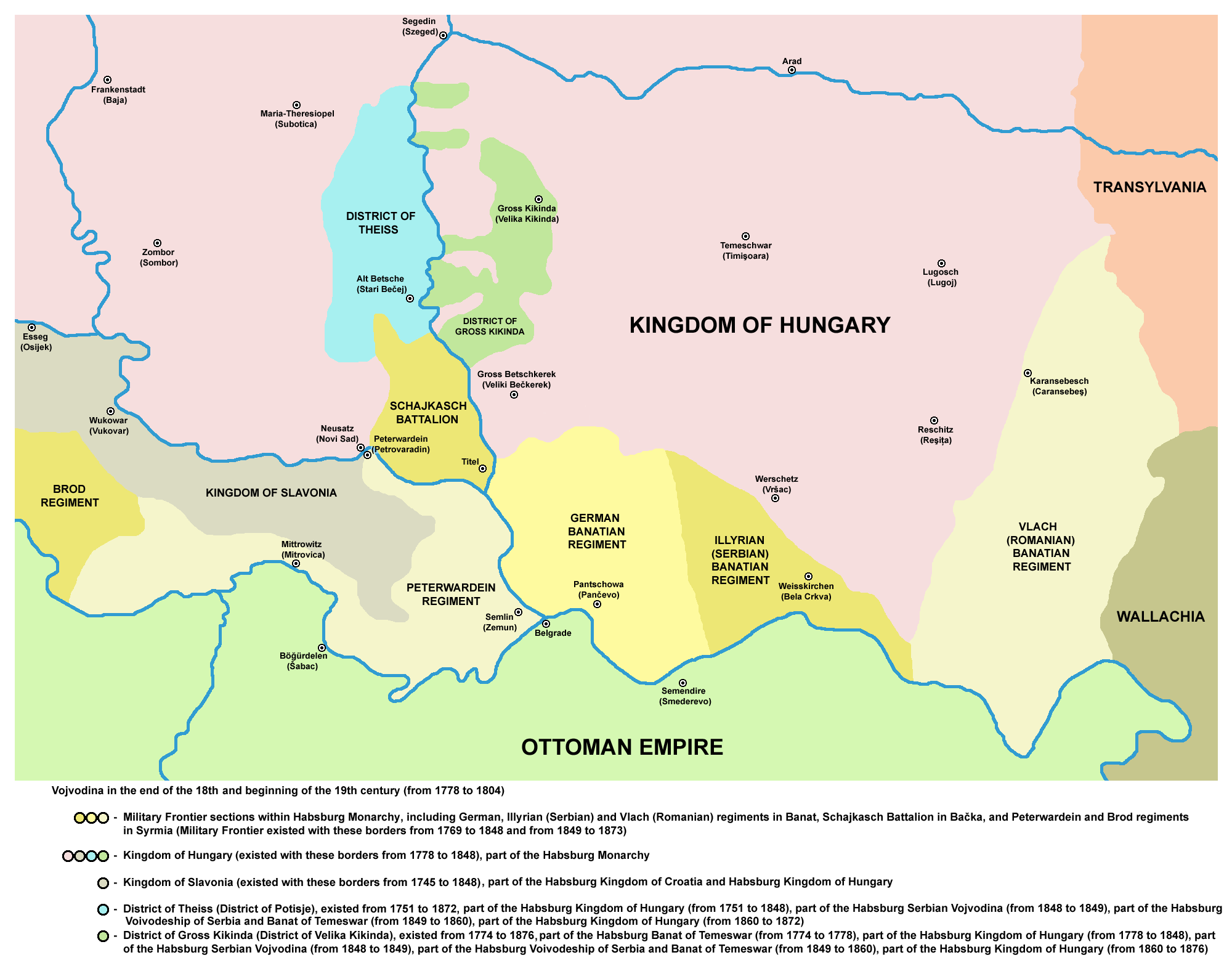
Map of Military Frontier sections in Banat, Syrmia and Bačka (18th-19th century)

The Banat Military Frontier was under military administration. It was organized according to regular regiments in 1764, that of the Illyrian Regiment headquartered in Bela Crkva and the Ansiedlungs Regiment headquartered in Pančevo. In 1775 it was reorganized as that of the Wallachian-Illyrian Regiment headquartered in Bela Crkva and the German Regiment headquartered in Pančevo.

In 1845 the Wallachian-Illyrian Regiment was divided and formally delineated into the Wallachian and Illyrian Regiments, the latter formed already in 1838.

== Military ==
In 1744–47 Engelshofen organized the Banat Land Militia (Banater Landmiliz), a continuation of the Militia of the Banat of Temeswar organized by graf de Mercy in 1724, led by Serbian veterans. A freikorps (volunteer unit) in Banat that numbered 700 infantry and 106 Hussars, mostly ethnic Serbs, was transformed into the Land Militia (also called "Land Battalion"), put under the command of hauptmann and obristlieutenant Simbschen. The Banat Military Frontier was established in 1751, and by 1752 the Land Militia had 1841 men. The Land Militia was made up of the Upper Companies (left bank of Tisa) and Lower Companies (along the Nera river, Nova Palanka near the Danube). The Land Militia was eventually disestablished with the formation of regular regiments in 1764–73. The first regulated Frontier regiments (regulierte Grenzregiment) were established in 1764, the Illyrian Regiment in Bela Crkva and the Ansiedlungs Regiment in Pančevo. The Upper Companies were dissolved in 1771 and the Lower Companies in 1773/74.

In 1775, the organization was finalized with two regiments, the German Banat Regiment (Deutsch-Banatischen Grenzregiment) headquartered in Pančevo and the Wallachian-Illyrian Regiment (Wallachische-Illyrischen Grenzregiment) headquartered in Caransebeș. In 1786, there were 68 officers in the German Regiment and 71 officers in the Illyrian Regiment. The ages of officers in the German Regiment was younger than in the Illyrian Regiment, while overall, one half was German and the other mostly "Illyrian" (Serb/Croat), and most were not locals. The soldiers in the two regiments were predominantly Orthodox in the late 18th and early 19th century.

Banat Military Frontier Regiments

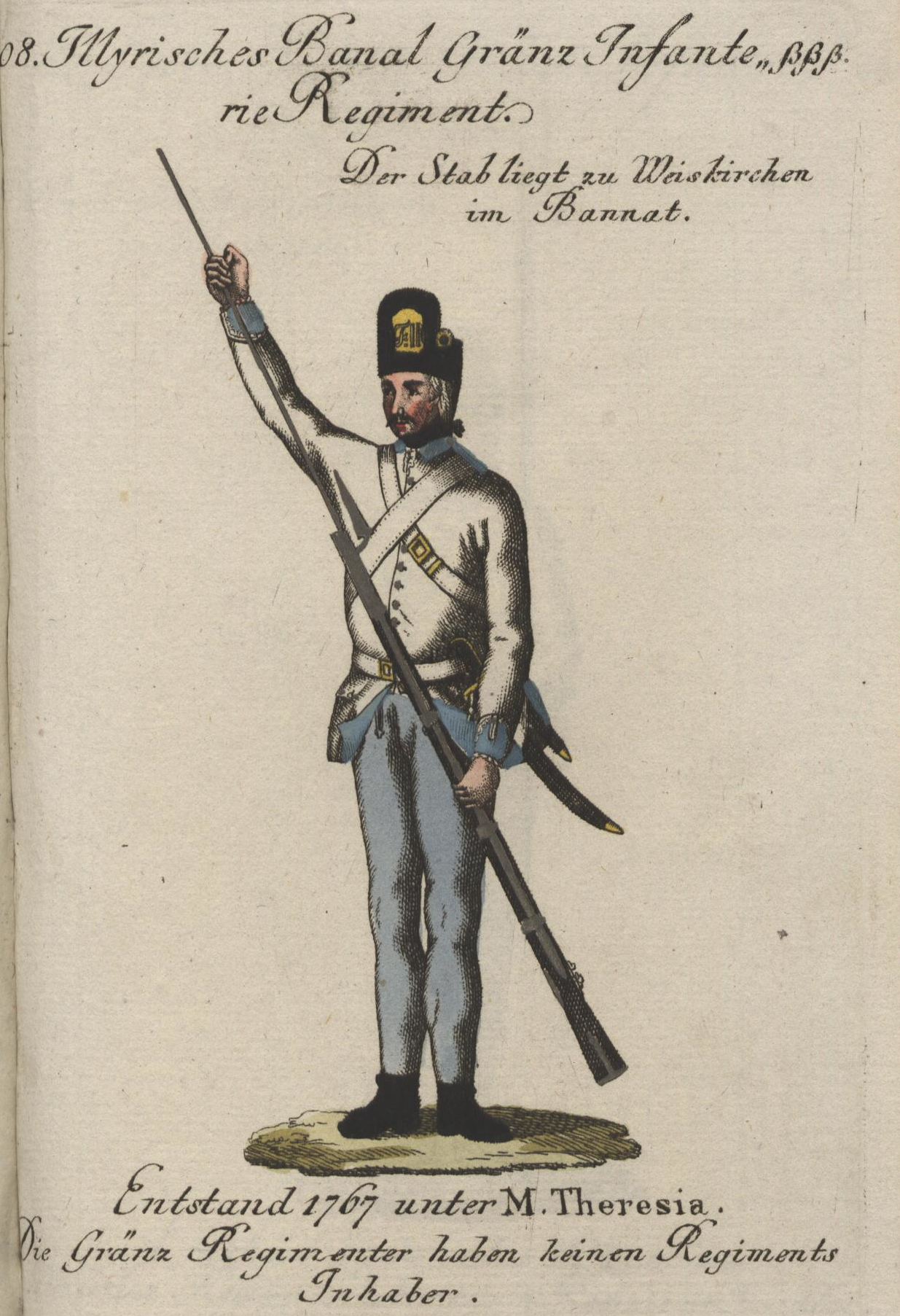
Wallachian-Illyrian Regiment

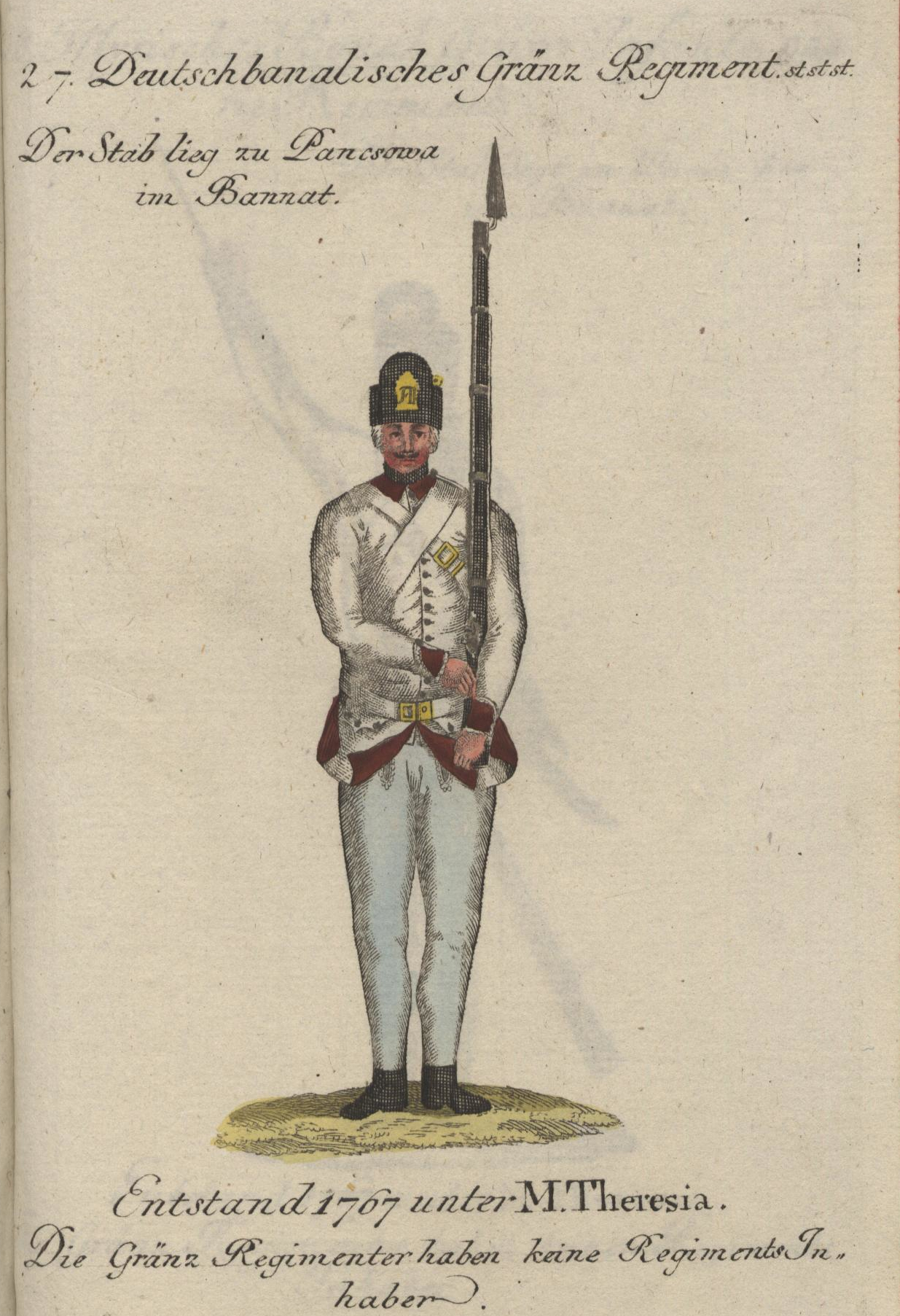
German Banat Regiment

== Demographics ==
In the territory of the Wallachian-Illyrian Regiment the absolute majority of population adhered to Orthodox Christianity. There were no foreign colonized Catholic population except instances in Bela Crkva, Mehadia and Caransebeș.

In the territory of the German Regiment the population was according to a 1781 census 82,89% Orthodox, 17,07% Catholic, 0,03% Protestant. A few Protestant colony settlements were established which somewhat affected the demographics. In the 1819 census there were 81% Orthodox, 13% Catholics and 6% Protestants in the German Regiment.

In 1857, the area included a total of 386,255 people:

- 314,514 (81.43%) Eastern Orthodox
- 51,860 (13.43%) Roman Catholics
- 19,418 (5.03%) Evangelists
- 393 (0.1%) Jews
- 70 (0.01%) others

== See also ==
- Slavonian Military Frontier
- Croatian Military Frontier
- Transylvanian Military Frontier

== Sources ==
- Dabić, Vojin S. (2011). "The Habsburg-Ottoman War of 1716-1718 and Demographic Changes in the War-Afflicted Territories". The Peace of Passarowitz, 1718. West Lafayette: Purdue University Press. pp. 191–208.
- Ilić-Mandić, Jelena (2020). "The Local Elite in Central Government Service: Banat Military Frontier Officers in the 18th Century". The Habsburg State-wide and the regions in the Southern Danube basin (16th-20th centuries). Wien: New academic press. pp. 99–121.
- Ilić-Mandić, Jelena (2021). "Forging the Wallachian Military Border, 1769-1772" (PDF). Banatica. 31 (2): 251–273.
- Ilić-Mandić, Jelena (2022a). "Making the Border and Frontiersmen: Militarisation in Temeswarer Banat, 1764-1775". From medieval frontiers to early modern borders in Central and South-Eastern Europe. Berlin: Peter Lang Publishing. pp. 207–228.
- Ilić-Mandić, Jelena (2022b). "The Military Frontier and Emigration Challenges in the 18th Century" (PDF). Migrations in the Slavic Cultural Space From the Middle Ages to the Present Day. Lódź: Wydawnictwo Universytetu Lódzkiego. pp. 45–62.
- Milleker, Felix (1925). Geschichte der Banater Militärgrenze, 1764-1873. K. Wittigschlager.
- Vaníček, Fr (1875). Specialgeschichte der Militärgrenze: aus Originalquellen und Quellenwerken geschöpft. Aus der Kaiserlich-Königlichen Hof- und Staatsdruckerei.
- Wrede, Alphons von (1898a). Geschichte der K. und K. Wehrmacht. Vol. 1. L. W. Seidel.
- Wrede, Alphons von (1898b). Geschichte der K. und K. Wehrmacht. Vol. 2. L. W. Seidel.
