= Franz Leopold Pontz von Engelshofen =

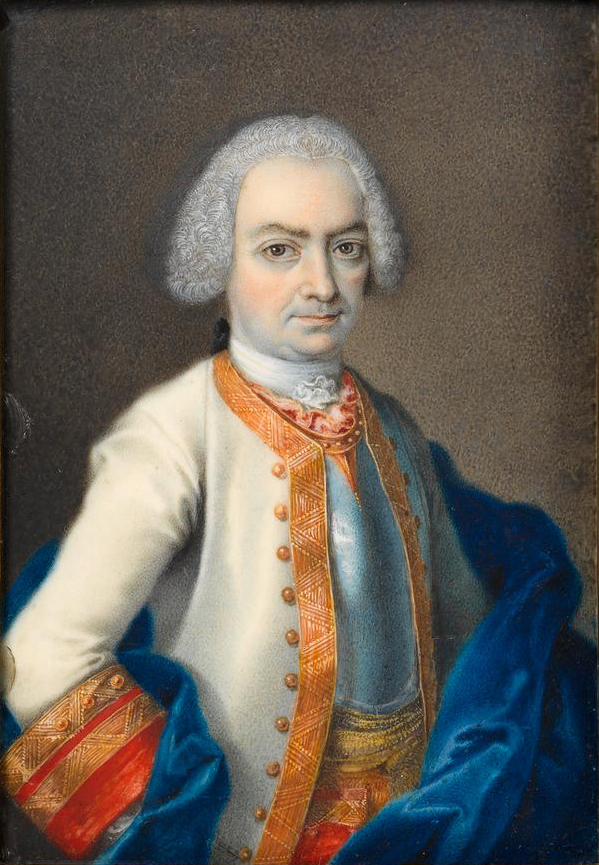
- 1754 portrait by Antonio Bencini
- Born: 26 December 1692; Vienna
- Died: 2 February 1761 (aged 68); Vienna
- Military career
- Allegiance: (Habsburg monarchy) Habsburg Austria
- Service years: 1717–61
- Rank: general
- Conflicts: Austro-Turkish War (1716–1718); Austro-Turkish War (1737–39); Austrian Succession (1740–48); Seven Years' War (1756–63)

Franz Leopold Pontz (1692–1761), later von Engelshofen, was an Austrian general and the governor of the Banat of Temeswar in 1740–57.

== Career ==
His father Johann Sigismund Pontz was a pharmacist, his mother was Rosina (née Gymnich).

As a soldier, Franz Pontz arrived in Banat in 1717 during the Austro-Turkish War (1716–1718). He was appointed captain in 1720, based in Banat. From 1727 he was first lieutenant-colonel, then commandant of Pančevo. In 1731 he was given hereditary freiherr status ("von Engelshofen"). He was appointed the fortress commandant of Temeswar in 1733 following the death of Johann Sprung. At the same time, he was deputy to the governor of the Banat of Temeswar, Claudius de Mercy.

In 1737 Pontz enlisted in the field army, and in October of the same year became commandant of Orschowa and then of Esseg. In 1738 he became a member of the Hofkriegsrat (War Council). In 1749 Pontz was the Inhaber of the Slavonian Hussar Regiment and in 1754 was ranked feldzeugmeister.

In 1740 Pontz was appointed commandant-general (governor) of the Banat of Temeswar, holding this position until his move to Vienna in 1757. As governor he continued the population settlement of the Banat. In 1744–47 he organized the Banat Land Militia. He founded the town of Mercydorf, named after de Mercy. In 1751, Empress Maria Theresa introduced civil administration in the Banat of Temeswar. Pontz headed the civil administration from 1751 to 1753, when he was replaced by Francesco de Paula Ramond Villana-Perlas de Rialpo. During his governorship, Pontz continued construction of the fortress in Timisoara, begun by de Mercy, facilitated the construction of the Timisoara Civic Hospital, continued the construction of the Timisoara Catholic cathedral, the foundation stone of which was laid in 1732 during the governorship of Johann Andreas Graf von Hamilton, and was involved in the reconstruction of the decayed thermal baths of Timisoara.

Pontz moved to Vienna in 1757, where he became city commander of the archduchies of both Upper Austria and Lower Austria. In Vienna he had a house in Wollzeile and one in Alservorstadt.

== Sources ==
- Petri, Anton Peter (1992). Biographisches Lexikon des Banater Deutschtums. Marquartstein: Th. Breit Verlag. ISBN 3-922046-76-2.
- Schwicker, Johann Heinrich (1872). Geschichte des Temeser Banats (in German). Aigner.
- Vaníček, Fr (1875). Specialgeschichte der Militärgrenze: aus Originalquellen und Quellenwerken geschöpft. Aus der Kaiserlich-Königlichen Hof- und Staatsdruckerei.
- Wrede, Alphons von (1898a). Geschichte der K. und K. Wehrmacht. Vol. 1. L. W. Seidel.
- Wrede, Alphons von (1898b). Geschichte der K. und K. Wehrmacht. Vol. 2. L. W. Seidel.

Military offices
Preceded by	Inhaber of Slavonian Hussar Regiment; 1749–	Succeeded by
