= Banat of Temeswar =

1718–1778 Habsburg province in east-central Europe

Banat of Temeswar Banat of Temes Temeschwarer Banat (German) Banatul Timişoarei (Romanian) Темишварски Банат (Serbian) Temišvarski banat (Serbian) Temesvári Bánság (Hungarian) Banatus Temesvariensis (Latin)
- Province of the Habsburg monarchy
- 1718–1778
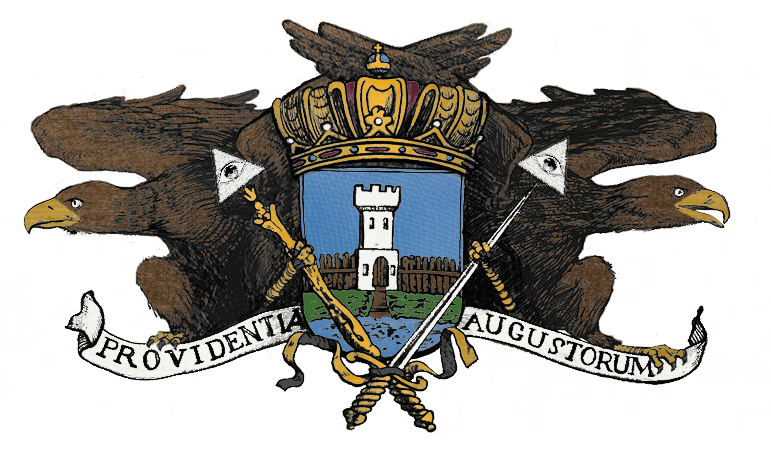
- Flag Coat of arms

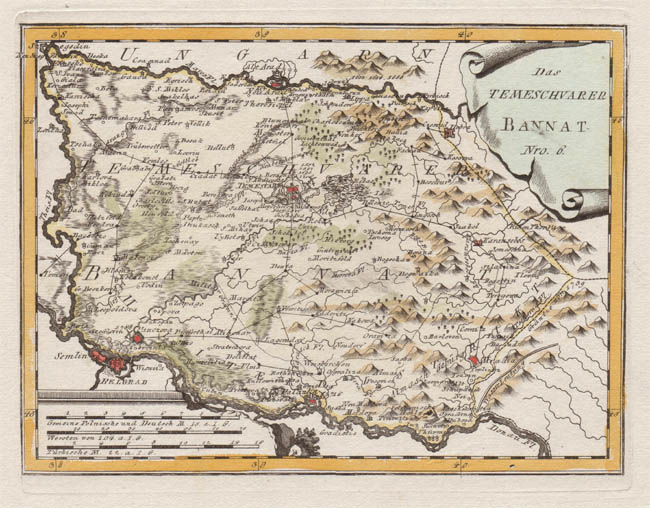
- Capital: Temeswar (Timișoara)
- History
  - Established: 12 July 1718
  - Disestablished: 6 June 1778
Preceded by	Succeeded by
Temeşvar Eyalet; Sanjak of Smederevo	Military Frontier; Kingdom of Hungary
- Today part of: Romania; Serbia; Hungary

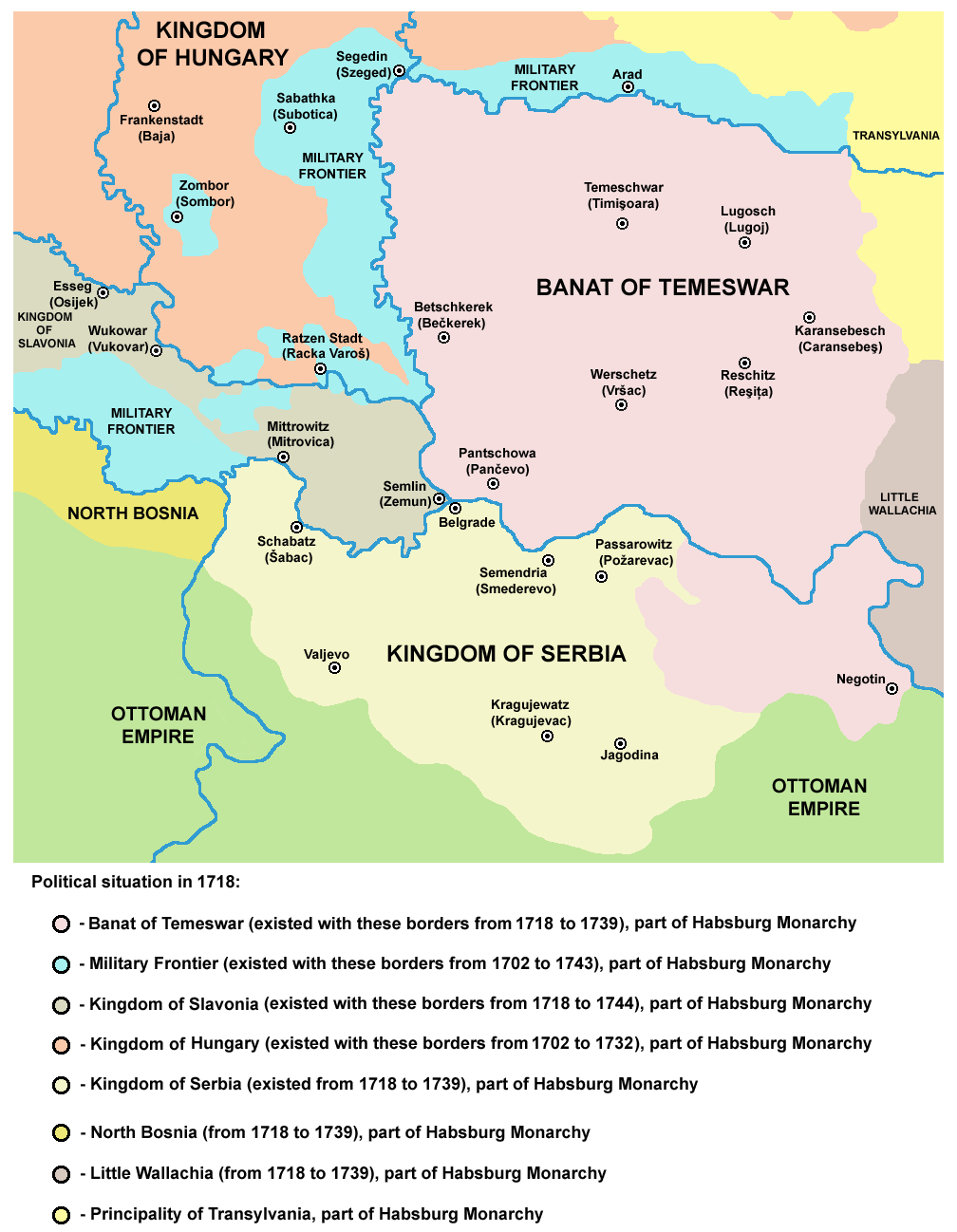
Banat of Temeswar, province of the Habsburg monarchy in 1718-1739

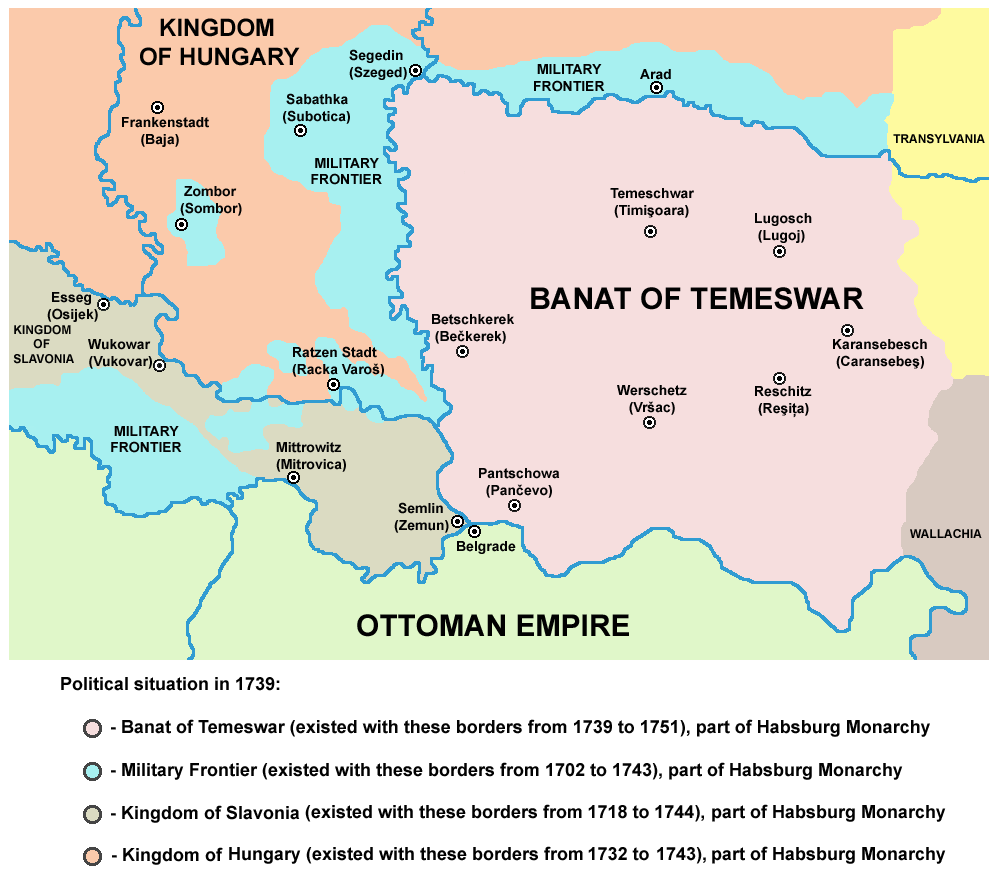
Banat of Temeswar, province of the Habsburg monarchy in 1739-1751

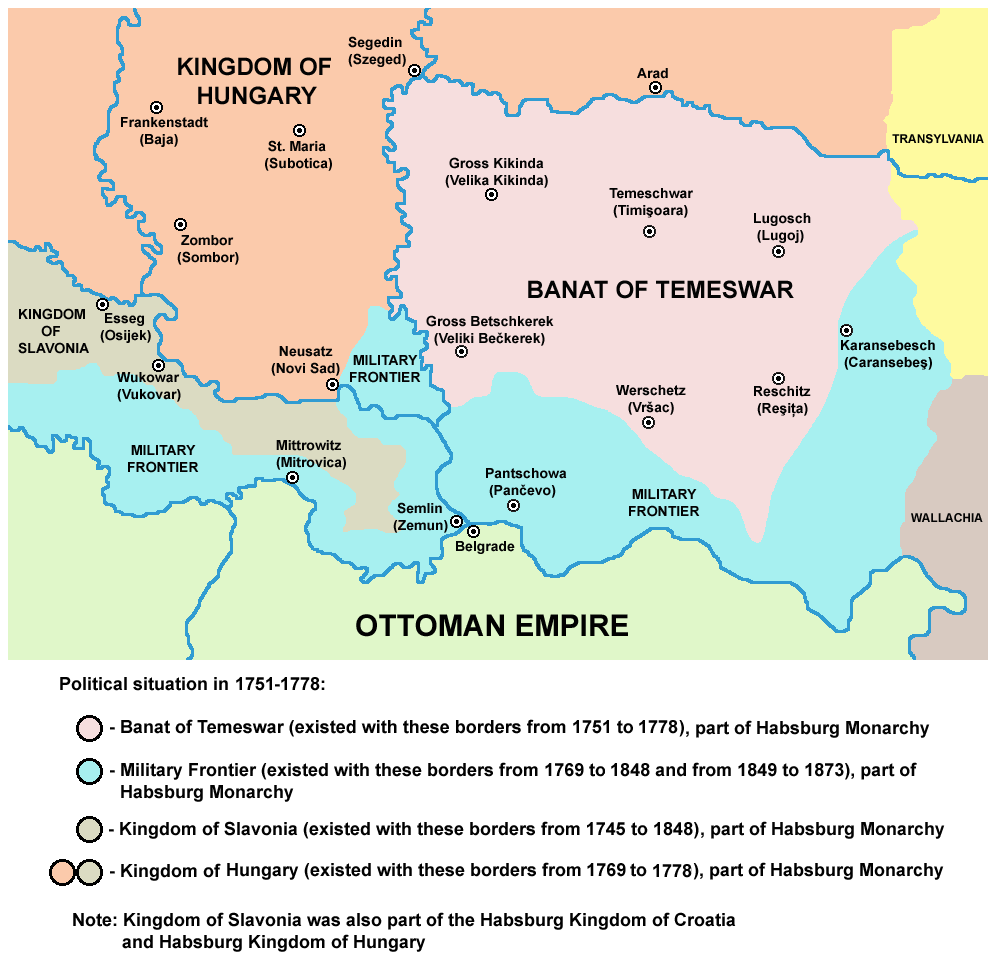
Banat of Temeswar in 1751–1778

The Banat of Temeswar or Banat of Temes was a Habsburg province that existed between 1718 and 1778. It was located in the present day region of Banat, which was named after this province. The province was abolished in 1778 and the following year it was incorporated into the Habsburg Kingdom of Hungary.

== Duality of name ==
In the official documents of the time and also in all of native languages of the region, the name of the province appears in two basic forms, first derived from the name of Temeswar (Timișoara), second derived from the name of Temes region: in German - Temeschwarer Banat (Temescher Banat), Romanian - Banatul Timişoarei (Banatul timişan), Serbian - Темишварски Банат (Тамишки Банат), Temišvarski banat (Tamiški Banat), Hungarian - Temesvári Bánság (Temesi Bánság) and Latin - Banatus Temesvariensis (Banatus Temesiensis).

== History ==
Before the Habsburg province was established, several other entities had existed in the Banat region, including: the Voivodeship of Glad (9th century), the Voivodeship of Ahtum (11th century), the medieval Kingdom of Hungary (11th - 16th century) and one of its frontier provinces the Banate of Severin (from 1233 to the 16th century), the Ottoman province named Eyalet of Temeşvar (1552–1716), and the Banate of Lugos and Karansebes province within the Principality of Transylvania (16th–17th century), which was under the suzerainty of the Ottoman Empire as a whole.

Although after the Austro-Ottoman war (1683–1697) and before the treaty of Karlowitz (1699) most parts of Banat were temporarily controlled by the forces of Prince Eugene of Savoy; in consequence of the treaty, the Ottoman sovereignty was recognized over the region with the fort of Temeşvar. However, as a result of the Spanish Succession War and the Rákóczi's War for Independence, the Habsburgs were inclined to direct their attention elsewhere within their country, and there was no attempt on their part to gain any territories from the Ottomans until 1710.

In the Austro-Turkish War of 1716-18, Prince Eugene of Savoy conquered the Banat region from the Ottoman Empire, which was recognized by the Treaty of Passarowitz (1718). The Habsburg monarchy then established a new military administrative region there under the name of Banat of Temeswar. The capital of the province became Temeswar. The province remained under military administration until 1751 when civil administration was introduced in northern parts of the region by Empress Maria Theresa of Austria.

From 1718 to 1739, Banat of Temeswar included not only the Banat region, but also parts of present-day eastern Serbia along the southern bank of the Danube river. Following the Treaty of Belgrade (1739), areas along the southern bank of Danube returned under Ottoman control. In 1751, the southern parts of Banat were excluded from the province and the Banatian Military Frontier was established in that area.

The Banat of Temeswar was abolished on 6 June 1778, and on 23 April 1779, it was incorporated into the Habsburg Kingdom of Hungary, while its former territory was divided into three counties: Torontál, Temes and Krassó. The southern part of the Banat region, which was part of the Banat of Temeswar until 1751, remained part of the Military Frontier (Banat Krajina) until 1873.

In 1849 following the Revolutions of 1848/1849 the Banat of Temeswar was resurrected as part of the new Voivodeship of Serbia and Banat of Temeswar crown land, which combined the former lands of the Banat of Temeswar with most of those from the self-proclaimed Serbian Vojvodina (excluding those parts of both within the military frontier). The former Banat counties of Torontál, Temes and Krassó were transformed into the Kreise of Groß Bečkerek, Temesvár and Lugos respectively. It was once again abolished in 1860; the counties were restored and re-merged into Hungary.

== Population ==
The province was bound to repopulate after the Habsburg conquest because it had a low population density on the grounds that the territory sustained a lot of adversity from the previous wars. The population density was among the lowest in Europe; some researchers suggest that it was around 1 person / square kilometres. According to the first census conducted by the Habsburg military authorities, the population of Banat numbered about 20,000 inhabitants, mostly Serbs. The former Muslim population of Banat had left the area immediately before and during the Habsburg conquest. The low population density resulted in the territory being repopulated by German families coming from Austrian and southern German lands, Romanians coming from Wallachia and Transylvania, by Slovaks from the north, and by Serb refugees coming from the Ottoman Empire, while some Serbs arrived in the area from other parts of the Habsburg monarchy. Colonization of various ethnic groups in the area lasted until the early 19th century. The government organized regimental districts which mostly had Serb population with special privileges in exchange for defending the borders. The area also lost its Hungarian population in the 16th century, but Hungarians were not allowed to return until the 1740s, because the Habsburgs regarded them as "politically unreliable". Thus, Hungarians were almost totally absent from Banat in the first half of the 18th century. After the permission was given, Hungarian settlers arrived from different parts of the kingdom (mainly from Transdanubia, Csongrád county and the Jász and Kun districts).

According to data from 1774, the population of the Banat of Temeswar was composed of:

- Romanians = 220,000
- Serbs and Greeks = 100,000
- Germans = 53,000
- Hungarians and Bulgarians = 2,400
- Jews = 340

The first official census took part during the rule of Joseph II, from the late 18th century. This shows Romanian majority in the east, Serbian in the west, and numerous German population in the whole area.

== Governors ==
Governors of Banat of Temeswar did not have the title of "ban". They were military governors and chefs of provincial administration (in German: Militärpräsidenten der Landesadministration des Temescher Banats).

- Claudius Florimund Mercy (1716–1734)
- Johann Andreas von Hamilton (1734–1738)
- Wilhelm Reinhard von Neipperg (1738–1739)
- August Jakob Heinrich von Suckow (1739–1740)
- Franz Anton Leopold Ponz von Engelshofen (1740–1757)
- Ferdinand Philipp von Harsch (1757–1758)
- Anton von Puebla (1758–1759)
- Siegmund Friedrich Samuel von Lietzen (1759–1769)
- Maximilian Joseph von Mitrowsky (1769–1775)
- Johann Franz Anton von Zedtwitz (1775–1779)

== See also ==
- Banat
- Banat Krajina
- Ottoman Province of Temeşvar

== Sources ==
- Bocşan, Nicolae (2015). "Illyrian privileges and the Romanians from the Banat" (PDF). Banatica. 25: 243–258.
- Ćirković, Sima (2004). The Serbs. Malden: Blackwell Publishing. ISBN 9781405142915.
- Dabić, Vojin S. (2011). "The Habsburg-Ottoman War of 1716-1718 and Demographic Changes in the War-Afflicted Territories". The Peace of Passarowitz, 1718. West Lafayette: Purdue University Press. pp. 191–208. ISBN 9781557535948.
- Ilić-Mandić, Jelena (2020). "The Local Elite in Central Government Service: Banat Military Frontier Officers in the 18th Century". The Habsburg State-wide and the regions in the Southern Danube basin (16th-20th centuries). Wien: New academic press. pp. 99–121.
- Ilić-Mandić, Jelena (2021). "Forging the Wallachian Military Border, 1769-1772" (PDF). Banatica. 31 (2): 251–273.
- Ilić-Mandić, Jelena (2022a). "Making the Border and Frontiersmen: Militarisation in Temeswarer Banat, 1764-1775". From medieval frontiers to early modern borders in Central and South-Eastern Europe. Berlin: Peter Lang Publishing. pp. 207–228. ISBN 9783631880111.
- Ilić-Mandić, Jelena (2022b). "The Military Frontier and Emigration Challenges in the 18th Century" (PDF). Migrations in the Slavic Cultural Space From the Middle Ages to the Present Day. Lódź: Wydawnictwo Universytetu Lódzkiego. pp. 45–62.
- Ingrao, Charles; Samardžić, Nikola; Pešalj, Jovan, eds. (2011). The Peace of Passarowitz, 1718. West Lafayette: Purdue University Press. ISBN 9781557535948.
- Marin, Irina. Contested Frontiers in the Balkans: Ottoman, Habsburg, and Communist Rivalries in Eastern Europe (I.B. Tauris, distributed by Palgrave Macmillan; 2013) 228 pages; focuses on the Banat of Temesvar
- Miodrag Milin, Vekovima zajedno (Iz istorije srpsko-rumunskih odnosa), Temišvar, 1995.
- Forţiu, Sorin. Denumirea Banatului în epoca modernă (sec. XVIII - XX): Banatus Timisvariensis vel Banatus Temesiensis?, in: Descoperiţi Banatul - Timişoara, Biblioteca Banaterra - Cartea 1, Editura Waldpress, Timişoara, 2009, 192 pg., ISBN 978-973 -7878-44-1; p. 104-144.
