= Northern Society of the Decembrists =

Northern Secret Society Северное тайное общество
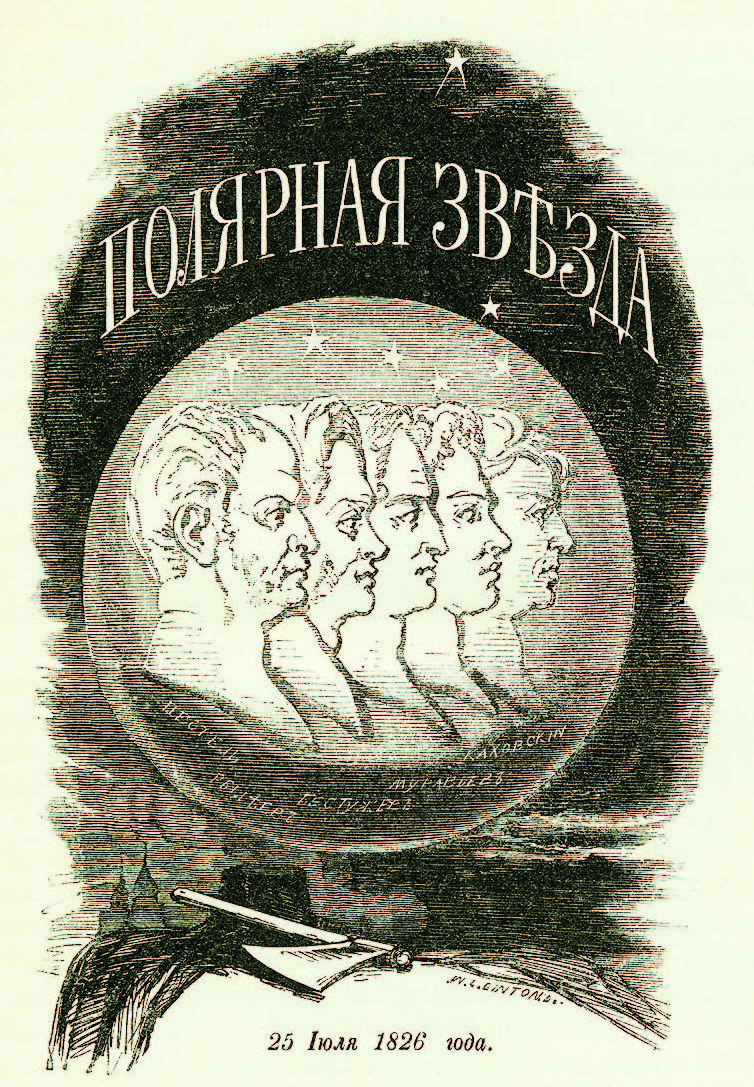
- Executed Decembrists, members of the Northern Society
- Supreme Duma members: Nikita Muravyov; Nikolay Turgenev; Yevgeny Obolensky; Sergei Trubetskoy; Kondraty Ryleyev; Alexander Odoevsky; Alexander Bestuzhev
- Founders: Nikita Muravyov; Sergei Trubetskoy
- Founded: 1821
- Dissolved: January 1826
- Split from: Union of Prosperity
- Headquarters: St. Petersburg
- Ideology: Classical liberalism Constitutionalism; Federalism; Abolitionism
- Movement: Decembrists

The Northern Secret Society (Russian: Северное тайное общество, romanized: Severnoye taynoye obshchestvo), also called the Northern Society of the Decembrists or the Decembrists, was formed in St. Petersburg after the dissolution of the Union of Prosperity. Its members participated in the Decembrist revolt.

== Formation ==
The Northern Society was formed in St. Petersburg in 1822 from two Decembrist groups headed by Nikita Muravyov and Sergei Trubetskoy.

When the Union of Prosperity was dissolved at the Moscow Congress of its leaders in January 1821, it was decided to create a new organization with four boards, one each in Moscow, Petersburg, Smolensk and Tulchin. However, none of them were created. Some future Decembrists, headed by Pavel Pestel, did not recognize the decision of the Moscow Congress and entered the Southern Society in March 1821. In St. Petersburg, the Northern Society appeared, and its organizational structure was formed in 1822. Members of the society were divided into "convinced" (full-fledged) and "agreeable" (unequal). The governing body was the "Supreme Duma" of three people (originally Nikita Muravyov, Nikolay Turgenev and Yevgeny Obolensky, later - Sergei Trubetskoy, Kondraty Ryleyev and Alexander Bestuzhev). At the beginning of 1825, Ryleyev attracted Pyotr Kakhovsky, who was extremely negative towards the Tsarist autocracy.

The guards officers Ivan Gorstkin, Mikhail Naryshkin, and naval officers Nikolai Chizhov, Boris and Mikhail Bodisko also took an active part in the Northern Society.

== Political views ==
The program document of the "northerners" was the "Constitution" of Nikita Muravyov.

The Northern Society was committed to more moderate goals than the Southern Society, intending to overthrow the monarchy and proclaim a constitutional state. Other ideas led by, Nikita Muravyov, wanted a constitutional monarchy and a legislature elected on a property-based franchise. However, the influential radical wing headed by Kondraty Ryleyev, Alexander Bestuzhev, Yevgeny Obolensky, Ivan Pushchin shared the ideas of Pavel Pestel's Russian Truth. In 1824, the latter himself came to St. Petersburg to achieve recognition of his program as common to both societies, which caused a revival in the radical wing of the "northerners". Secretly from the moderate leaders of the Northern Society, the St. Petersburg branch of the Southern Society was formed. As a result, an active discussion unfolded, which led to the fact that both of them made concessions: the "northerners" agreed to establish a republic after the coup, and the "southerners" agreed to convene a Constituent Assembly.

Local historian of Yakutia Nikolay Shchukin in his essay Alexander Bestuzhev in Yakutsk quotes the latter's statement:

"[...] the purpose of our conspiracy was to change the government, some wanted a republic in the image of the United States; others a constitutional king, as in England; still others wanted, without knowing what, but propagated other people's thoughts. We called these people hands, soldiers and accepted them into the society only for numbers. The head of the Petersburg conspiracy was Ryleyev."

=== Constitution ===
==== State structure ====
- The introduction of a constitutional monarchy.
- Formation of a federation of 13 states based on the economic characteristics of the regions. "Powers" were tied to the seas or large navigable rivers.
- Separation of powers into legislative, executive and judicial.
- Creation of a bicameral People's Council, elected on the basis of a large property qualification and consisting of the Verkhovna Duma (upper house) and the House of People's Representatives (lower house). The deputies to both chambers were to be elected for 6 years, and every two years a third of the deputies were re-elected. The upper house was elected by 3 deputies from each power and two from the "regions". In the lower one—one deputy from 50,000 male residents.
- The "states" elected a Sovereign veche, whose deputies were elected for 4 years and a quarter of them were re-elected annually.
- Executive power belonged to the emperor, who was also the Supreme Commander-in-Chief, who, with the consent of the Supreme Duma, appointed ambassadors, consuls, judges of the supreme court, and ministers. The emperor was considered "the first official of the state" and received a large salary—from 8 to 10 million rubles in silver a year. The emperor could maintain his court, but the courtiers in this case were deprived of voting rights, as they were "in service."

==== Serfdom ====
- Serfdom was abolished, but the possessions of the landowners remained with the old owners.
- The liberated peasants received up to 2 acres of arable land per yard.

==== Citizens' rights ====
- Equality of all citizens before the law.
- Freedom of speech, press, religion.

==== The land question ====
Members of the Society believed that the land should be divided into:

- public - (peasant, state, monastic and half landlord) which is transferred to the peasants free of charge, but without the right to buy and sell;
- private - which is in market circulation.

== Bibliography ==
- Yarmolinsky, Avrahm (2014) [1957]. Road to Revolution: A Century of Russian Radicalism. Princeton, New Jersey: Princeton University Press. ISBN 069161041X. OCLC 890439998.
- Фёдоров, В. А., ed. (1981). Мемуары декабристов. Северное общество (in Russian). Москва: МГУ. OCLC 8848740.
