= Michael Lunin =

Russian political philosopher and activist (1787–1845)

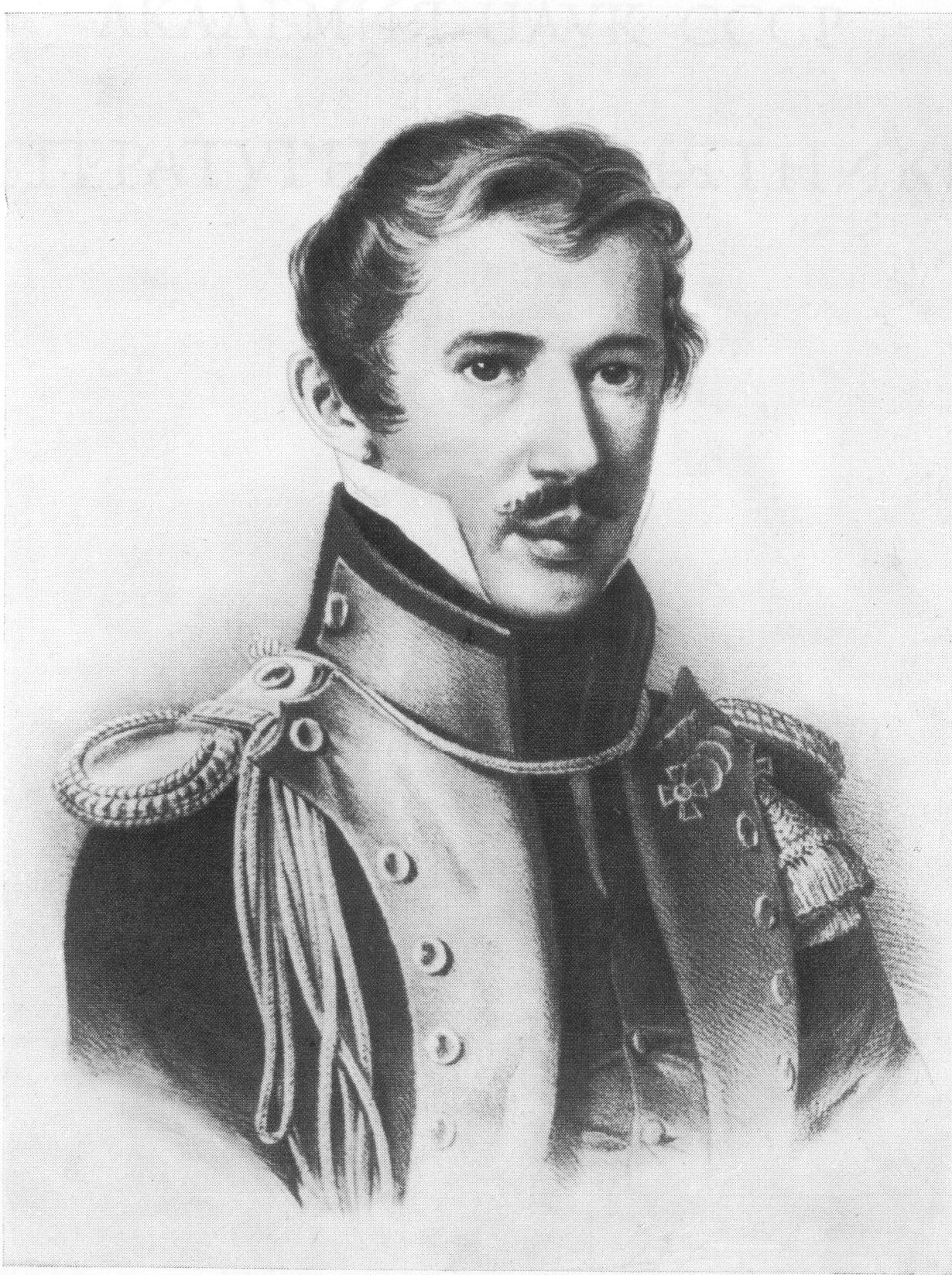
- Lunin in 1822
- Born: Mikhail Sergeyevich Lunin; 8 December 1787; St. Petersburg, Russian Empire
- Died: 3 December 1845 (aged 57); Akatuy katorga, Nerchinsk katorga, Russian Empire

Philosophical work
- Era: Contemporary philosophy
- Region: Russian philosophy
- School: Liberalism, Romanticism
- Main interests: Republicanism, Catholicism, Liberalism
- Notable ideas: Russian liberalism

Mikhail Sergeyevich "Michael" Lunin (Russian: Михаил Сергеевич Лунин; 8 December 1787 – 3 December 1845), also known as Mikhaïl Lounine, was a Russian political philosopher, revolutionary, Mason, Decembrist, lieutenant of the Grodno Life Guards regiment and a participant of the Franco-Russian Patriotic War of 1812.

After a successful career in the military during the Napoleonic invasion, he became involved with multiple liberal Russian secret societies in the early 19th century, including the Union of Salvation and the Union of Welfare, as well as the Northern Society and the Southern Society. After the Decembrist Revolt took place in 1825, he was arrested due to his affiliations with the men responsible, and was subsequently exiled to a labor camp in Siberia. Lunin spent time in Finnish jails, three different prisons in Siberia, and lived on a farm under the watchful eye of the government during his life as an exile. Known for keeping good spirits and maintaining a firm defiance of autocratic rule, Lunin was eventually imprisoned again for writing in "opposition" to the Russian government, and lived out the rest of his life in a cell.

== Early life ==
Lunin was born on 8 December 1787 in Saint Petersburg, Russia. His father, Sergei Mikhailovich Lunin, was Active Civil Councilor to the tsar, the fourth rank in the Russian civil service, and his mother was Feodosiya Nikitichna Lunina (née Muravyova), the daughter of a wealthy family. Feodosiya died in 1792 while giving birth to a daughter, leaving Sergei to raise their sons, Mikhail and Nikita. The father hired a series of short-tenured tutors and governors, who managed to give Mikhail the usual training of a young gentleman in history, mathematics, literature, some French and Latin, along with practical attainments such as dancing, fencing, and horseback riding. With his father an often-distant figure, in accordance with the norms of the time, Lunin received little effective discipline. Mikhail was a child of opulence—a private education, servants, sculpted busts of Roman emperors, a music room with piano, an orangery—and he came to expect this wealth as natural.

One of his principal tutors, Abbé Vouvillier, was not just Catholic but a devoted Jesuit, hired in 1797 during the Russian sympathy for French exiles fleeing the Revolution. Vouvillier proselytized for Catholicism in Orthodox Russia, of which Sergei aware, but apparently did not consider a threat, at least initially. As Lunin did become a Catholic later in life, this early influence should not be underestimated.

== Military career ==
Lunin first joined the military in September 1803 to defend Russia against Napoleon's invasion. An excellent swordsman and rider, he quickly advanced through the ranks, becoming a cornet in winter 1805–06. Lunin became more and more eccentric and brash, but he demonstrated his ability, bravery, and courage on multiple occasions. In one incident, with his regiment in reserve behind the front lines, he decided to ride off by himself and join the battle. By 1815, his reputation was such that the imperial family knew him personally and spoke highly of him, anticipating that he would rise even higher in the ranks. However, pressed by personal debts and a desire to see more action, he wished to transfer to a regiment outside the capital, which was the main locus of prestige and advancement. After Lunin challenged an influential personage to a duel, the fallout forced Lunin to leave the military altogether.

== Conversion to Catholicism ==
At the age of 26 in Vilna, Lunin met the French writer, editor, and translator Hippolyte Auger, who had joined the Russian army. For Auger, who was on the Paris police register of homosexuals, it was love at first sight. As he later wrote of Lunin: "the soft look, playful mouth, quick animation, imperturable manner offered, depending on the case, whatever you were looking for". Lunin wanted to distance himself from his father, and in 1816 he and Auger decided to head to South America to join Bolivar's Liberadores. They only got as far as Paris, where they shared a tiny garret, Lunin engaged in a variety of pursuits, including taking lessons in French, English, algebra, and piano, and penning a novel about "False" Dmitri, a 17th-century pretender to the Russian throne, who may have been homosexual. Auger introduced him to Saint-Simonian socialists, theatre acquaintances, and Jesuits.

In 1817, Auger introduced Lunin to Father Fidèle de Grivel, another Jesuit like Vouvillier, as well as an abbé named Thirias. Having many opportunities to speak with them at length in their social circle, Lunin declared himself Catholic. This conversion both his religion and his politics. He thought Orthodox Christianity had become too diminished by the arbitrariness of man at the expense of the divine, that Protestantism subjugated faith to human reason, and that atheism was out of the question; so he settled on Catholicism, abjuring his native Orthodoxy. This faith in the Catholic Church, whose hierarchy claimed a moral ground above secular authority, inspired his later involvement in secret societies plotting to overthrow what he viewed as an illegitimate and tyrannical tsar.

== Estate in Russia ==
After hearing that his father had died, Lunin arrived back in Russia in April 1817 to take charge of his estate, leaving Auger behind in Paris. Lunin quickly found his inheritance encumbered by a sizable debt, and set about paying it off. During this time, he drafted a legally questionable will which would have freed his serfs after his death and granted them a portion of land. He originally planned to leave the estate to his sister, but he feared she would be dominated by her conservative husband A. F. Uvarov, who would likely keep the serfs in bondage. Thus to make his plans more effective, he changed his beneficiary to his younger cousin, Nikolaj Aleksandrovi.

Also in Lunin's second draft of his will, he rescinded the grant of land to the freed serfs. Lunin seems to have concluded that private owners of the land often failed to use it to its full potential for common benefit. Because agriculture was the foundation of social stability, it was imperative that land be owned largely by the government to prevent exploitation and class division among nobles, rich peasants, poor peasants, and farm laborers. This attitude constituted a definite threat to the Russian state and its landowning aristocracy, and foreshadowed his later scheming to fundamentally transform the Russian government.

== The Masons ==
Another important influence in Lunin's early life were the Masons. During his young manhood they reached a height of influence in Saint Petersburg, even to the point of royal family members joining lodges. In contrast to the autocratic spirit that otherwise pervaded Russia, these lodges allowed free expression and often followed Enlightenment ideals of human reason leading to continuous progress.

In 1817, Lunin joined the Loge des Trois Vertus (Lodge of Three Virtues), which followed the French or English style concerned with practical economic and political issues, as opposed to the German style more prone to mysticism. In fact, this lodge was the most politically oriented in Russia, understanding the Masonic creed to center on the equality of mankind and the duty of Masons to foster it, making conflict with the Russian government inevitable. Lunin was naturally sympathetic to these ideals, but he soon realized that there was little chance of them getting beyond talk.

In addition, he began to feel torn between Masonry and Catholicism. The two organizations distrusted each other, with the Masons even accusing the Church of corruption. Ultimately, his Catholic loyalty prevailed, and he left the Masons altogether, but he soon found other, more secret, societies that shared his desire for action.

== Secret societies ==
Lunin was partly responsible for the creation of the first Decembrist society, the "Union of True and Faithful Sons of the Fatherland." Though he departed for France in the fall of 1825, he was still connected to this society and others like the Union of Salvation (later the Union of Welfare), casting suspicion on him after the subsequent failed Decembrist Revolt that winter. The group's stated goals of transitioning Russia into a constitutional monarchy, abolishing serfdom, and reducing the influence of foreigners in the government probably would have been alone enough to alarm the government, but some members went even further. For example, F. P. Šaxovskoj of the Union of Salvation believed the group should assassinate the tsar, which Lunin was accused of supporting. Lunin insisted that he had known nothing of these ideas before returning to Moscow, but he was accused of returning expressly to participate in the plot. However, the record of a key meeting seems to support his innocence: during the discussion of a paper on monarchic versus republican governments, he spoke for a limited monarchy under a constitutional tsar, as against a Russian republic.

Nevertheless, though he sometimes denied it, Lunin maintained ties with a succession of secret political groups for years, especially after he rejoined the army and was posted in Poland after its absorption into the Russian Empire. Though his active participation was limited, Lunin acted as a kind of liaison between the Polish Secret Patriotic Society, which desired Polish autonomy, and the Southern Society, an anti-tsar Russian group which might have been too radical for Lunin's taste.

Lunin seems to have grown tired of the societies’ inability to agree on plans and take action. He may also have come to believe in the necessity of a mass movement to effect real change. Even Lunin's lukewarm participation in the various societies was eventually sufficient to sentence him to exile in Siberia after the Decembrist Revolt.

== Arrest and trial ==
In December 1825, Russian army officers led about 3,000 soldiers to Senate Square in Saint Petersburg in a protest against Tsar Nicholas I's assumption of the throne, after his elder brother Constantine had removed himself from the line of succession. Nicholas quickly subdued the rebels, and set about consolidating his rule.

Lunin was not personally involved in the uprising, and was not immediately arrested even after it was learned he was involved with the Union of Salvation, the Union of Welfare, and the Northern and Southern Societies. He had been aide-de-camp to Constantine, now Grand Duke after declining the throne. The Duke was determined to defend his protege and wrote multiple letters to the Tsar, but Nicholas continued the investigation, pressuring those already arrested to give decisive evidence against Lunin. Nicholas got his wish after Pavel Pestel, a longtime acquaintance of Lunin in multiple societies, confessed after long interrogation (perhaps amounting to torture) that Lunin had suggested a plot to assassinate Tsar Alexander in 1816. Lunin was arrested on 9 April 1826.

Despite this testimony, the case against Lunin was still not very strong. There was no proof that he had joined the army in Poland with any ulterior motive in mind, and his ties with the secret societies were either weak or had been broken altogether, as with the Northern Society. The court required proof that Lunin himself had suggested assassinating Tsar Alexander, or at least attended meetings where this was proposed. Finally, another admission to this effect was obtained after severe interrogation of Nikita Murav’ev, another of Lunin's imprisoned associates. Encouraged by this, the court brought Lunin in for direct questioning in the hope he would confess, but he consistently denied that he had ever suggested or plotted the death of Alexander. Lunin also asserted that Russian plots against the life of the tsar were frequent in the country's history, and had often been justified as replacing an incompetent with a more capable ruler.

Regardless of whether Lunin actually endorsed assassination, he does seem to have supported Grand Duke Constantin for tsar instead of Nicholas, attracted by Constantine's professed liberal and reformist views. In the end, the court found him innocent of advocating regicide, but due to his connections to various societies and his alleged association with a regicidal plot by Pestel, he was found guilty of sympathizing with or proposing revolt as well as spreading propaganda and sedition. He was originally sentenced to permanent exile and loss of constitutional rights, but this was commuted to twenty years of hard labor followed by exile. According to eyewitnesses, Lunin was surprisingly sanguine upon hearing the verdict, perhaps supported by his religious convictions.

Lunin's assets were forfeit, and an auction of his goods was held to pay his outstanding debts. His will still bequeathed his estate and serfs to his cousin Nikolaj Aleksandrovi, but his sister Uvarova contested this. The Supreme Court in Saint Petersburg initially ruled in favor of Nikolaj, but Uvarova prolonged the battle in public opinion. In December 1827, the Minister of Justice decided that Lunin was entitled to name his beneficiary, but that his serfs could not legally be freed. However, a month later, with Lunin en route to a labor camp, Uvarova won a rehearing and the Minister reversed his decision, granting her Lunin's estates.

== Exile to Siberia ==
=== Sveaborg Fortress ===
Tsar Nicholas I planned to send the Decembrist exiles to Chita and Petrovskij Zavod camps in eastern Siberia near the Nercinck Mines. Neither camp was prepared to take over a hundred prisoners, so they were provisionally sent to Finland. Lunin and seven other Decembrists were taken to the Swedish-built Sveaborg Fortress off the coast of Helsinki.

As the exiled Decembrists made their way northward, the local people met them warmly. In the town of Kostroma, a man shouted: "Gentlemen, be brave, you are suffering for the most beautiful, the most noble cause. Even in Siberia you will find sympathy." Though most of the inhabitants knew little of the exiles or regarded them simply as rebels, the failed Decembrist cause drew sympathy from the local upper classes. Many of the exiles received support and much needed care from the locals during hard times.

Nicholas I seems to have been obsessed with the Decembrists, personally overseeing their punishment. Though most Russians knew little about the Decembrist Revolution, Nicholas was paranoid of a "general uprising in eastern Siberia," and followed his generals’ advice to guard the exiles in groups, though isolating them would have done more to break their spirit. Nicholas did order the separation of Lunin and his close companion Nikita Murav'ev.

Lunin remained at Sveaborg Fortress for half a year, but the government distrusted its security and easy communication between prison cells. The prisoners were moved to various other prisons, with Lunin and two others sent to Vyborg Castle. The cells were constantly damp, and dilapidated from previous floods. The other two exiles fell sick with toothache, but Lunin maintained his characteristic physical and mental strength. Asked whether he had all he needed, he famously replied: "I am quite satisfied with everything. I lack only an umbrella." After eighteen months in Vyborg, Lunin and three other exiles were escorted eastwards through Irkutsk to join the largest group of Decembrist exiles in Chita. The guards forced a rapid pace on the journey, and one of the exiles, Mikhail Bestuzhev, was nearly killed when he was thrown off the coach and dragged by his chains.

=== Chita ===
Lunin arrived in Chita at the end of June in 1828, two years after his sentence. Three hundred kilometers southeast of Lake Baikal, the settlement sat in a beautiful valley at the junction of the Chita and Ingoda rivers. Many of the Decembrists who spent time there spoke of its natural beauty: its varied flora, vibrant colors, stunning views, "golden pastures and fragrant meadows," made it the "Garden of Siberia." The local people were hospitable, often caring for to sick Decembrists, who often remembered locals in their will. The town also had an unusually humane commandant for the time.

The exiles struggled to recover from their journey, and many, Lunin included, struggled to survive on the meager allowance from the government. In addition to physical stress, the Decembrists also had to deal with doubts about the worthiness of their cause. Lunin, however, "was not daunted, and remained cheerful," if rather withdrawn. He stayed mostly alone in his room, in the little chapel he had set up, but still managed to remain on pleasant terms with the exiles and locals. The Decembrists gave evening lectures to educate the locals played guitar in musical evenings, and worked extensively on an escape plan.

Some of the exiles began to crack under the stress, and wrote to the tsar requesting pardon to fight in the Caucasus. Alexander Bestuzhev wrote:

To the noble soul trained in battles are understandable the sufferings of a military man destined to rot in idleness, when the glory of the Russian arms thunders over the cradle of the ancient world, over the grave of Mohammed. Asking you this grace, I do not seek advantages nor distinction: I only seek an opportunity to shed my blood for the glory of the Sovereign and honorably end the life granted to me, in order that after it the name criminal shall not be known.

Lunin responded with a disdainful letter:

I hear that some of our political exiles have expressed their desire to serve as privates in the Caucasian army, hoping to make peace with the government. In my opinion it is unwise for them to do so before subjecting themselves to some slight scrutiny. The first day one should request that he be flogged fifty times, the second day a hundred, and the third day two hundred times, so that altogether it would make three hundred and fifty times. After such a scrutiny one could proclaim: dignus, dignus est intrare in isto doctor corpore.

Twenty-six months after his arrival, when the barracks at Petrosvskij Zavod had been sufficiently expanded, the exiles at Chita marched the seven hundred versts westward to their new home. Lunin hired a covered wagon with money from his sister. Thinking him the most important of the prisoners, the Siberian Buryat guides surrounded his carriage to ask about his crime, and were impressed when Lunin explained that he had tried to cut the "Great Khan’s" throat.

=== Petrosvskij Zavod ===
In Petrosvskij Zavod, Lunin began slowly to flex his powerful mind once again. He restricted his reading to religious texts only, but, still hungry for news, he had others read him newspapers. Lunin, though still reserved, tried to glean everything he could from the wide variety of his fellow prisoners (for unlike Chita camp, Petrosvskij Zavod was a real prison). Lunin pressed for their thoughts on Russia's political future, on Poland and the Americas, establishing yet again his reputation for being a unique, quirky, and yet pleasant man. Baron A.E. Rozen, a fellow exile, wrote of him later:

M.S. Lunin lived in the most curious manner. He lived in No. 1, a totally dark cell in which no window had been pierced – a guard-room being built beside it. He did not share our common table, and kept his fasts after the custom of the Roman Church... One third of his cell was shut off by a curtain behind which, elevated on some steps, was a large crucifix blessed by the Pope, which his sister had sent him from Rome. All day long, loud Latin prayers would be audible in his cell…when he strolled among us he was invariably witty and agreeable. Whenever we called on him in his cell we always found him ready to converse in a secular and often jocular strain. He was greatly provoked by Victor Hugo’s Notre Dame de Paris, I recall, which penetrated even our wilds and was read avidly; he had the patience to burn the whole book with a candle…

=== Urik ===
In the middle of June 1835, Lunin arrived in Urik, a small town close to Irkutsk. His twenty years hard labor had been shortened to ten, and he had been sent with several other Decembrists to a plot of land provided by the government. Lunin built a house, cleared the land around it, drained a bog for a garden and a summerhouse, and grew corn. Lunin also continued to stretch himself intellectually, spending time in prayer and Bible study, and building a library for himself with the help of his friend Nikita Murav’ev and his sister Urarova. He received permission to write to family and friends, though in intent he was actually writing to the world at large. He told his sister, "I rejoice that my letters…engage you. They serve as an expression of those convictions for which I was led to the place of execution, to a cell, and to exile. The publicity enjoyed by my letters through their numerous copies turns them into a political weapon...which I must use for the defense of freedom." Lunin's letters recounted his personal story, and pressed the need for the emancipation of the serfs.

=== Death in Akatui ===
Lunin knew his taunting letters would "tease the white bear," and it was only a matter of time before the authorities snapped back. In September 1838 Lunin lost his letter-writing privileges for a year, but once the ban was lifted, Lunin continued to write even more blatantly. His hope in effecting change even from his exile is echoed in his words: "From the sighs of those living under thatched roofs storms are born which destroy palaces."

In 1841 the authorities discovered a manuscript of his "Glance at Russian Secret Societies from 1816 to 1826," which infuriated Tsar Nicholas I. He wrote: "[The exiles] are stripped of everything: their social status, their property, their health, their homeland, their liberty…But no one can rob them of popular sympathy towards them…The Russian mind may, for a while, be led astray, but Russian popular sentiment is not to be deceived." Copies of the article were confiscated, and Lunin was arrested. He dodged his interrogators by claiming he could only answer adequately in French. He was sentenced to isolation at the Akatui mine, where it was said that even birds died from the poisoned air from the mines, kept in a sweltering cell with "water oozing from the walls", and fed on bread and water. He wrote: "The architect who built the prison of Akatui must have inherited Dante’s imagination." Still Lunin maintained his happy disposition and habits of prayer, and received visits from a Catholic priest. Always amiable, he attempted to intervene for fellow prisoners. His sister Uvarova pleaded for him to no avail, and he died after four years at Akatui. Some believe he was killed by an angry prison guard, some by charcoal poisoning, and by a stroke in his sleep.
