= Southern Society of the Decembrists =

Underground political organization in 19th-century Russia

Southern Society of the Decembrists Южное общество декабристов
- Decembrists at the Senate Square
- Abbreviation: SSotD
- Leader: Pavel Pestel
- Founded: March 1821
- Dissolved: January 1826
- Split from: Union of Prosperity
- Headquarters: Tulchin
- Ideology: Liberalism; Militarism; Factions: Republicanism
- Political position: Centre-left and left-wing
- Movement: Decembrists

The Southern Society of the Decembrists (Russian: Южное общество декабристов) was one of two, along with the Northern Society, main secret revolutionary organizations of the Decembrists. Created in March 1821 on the basis of the Tulchin Council of the Union of Prosperity. The Society was headed by a Directory consisting of Pavel Pestel, Alexei Yushnevsky and Sergey Muravyov-Apostol.

== History ==
The Southern Society was created in March 1821 by members of the Tulchin Council of the former Union of Prosperity (Pavel Pestel, Alexei Yushnevsky, Alexander Baryatinsky and a number of others), who formed the so-called "Root Duma" of the society. Pestel and Yushnevsky were originally members of the Directory, the highest governing body of the company. Soon a number of other people joined the Society, including the brothers Sergey and Matvei Muravyov-Apostol (the former of which was introduced into the Directory), Alexander Poggio, Ferdinand Wolf, as well as a number of other persons who were officers of the 1st and 2nd armies stationed in Ukraine.

The 1822 congress finally approved the creation of the society. At the congress of 1823, the society was divided into 3 councils (branches): Tulchinskaya, headed by Pestel (later Baryatinsky), Kamenskaya, headed by Davydov and Volkonsky, and Vasilkovskaya, headed by Sergei Muravyov-Apostol. The participants of the 1824 congress discussed and approved the program of the society - Russian Truth, written by Pestel. At the congress in 1825, questions were discussed about the possibility of organizing an uprising in the army against the Tsarist autocracy.

The leaders of the Southern Society tried to unite with the Northern Society of Decembrists, but this unification in the end never took place. (Note: Pestel even suggested in absentia "for communication with St. Petersburg" to introduce Nikita Muravyov into the Directory) In the spring of 1824, Pestel negotiated in St. Petersburg with the leadership of the Northern Society, but he failed to persuade them to unite on the basis of the Russian Truth, although the Northern Decembrists were ready to accept the republican principle, and Pestel was ready to accept the idea of the Constituent Assembly instead of the dictatorship of the Provisional Supreme Government. An agreement was reached on the generality of actions in the event of the outbreak of an uprising and on the convocation of a unification congress. In 1823–25, negotiations were held between the Southern Society and the Polish Patriotic Society on the possibility of a joint opposition to tsarism. In September 1825, the Society of United Slavs became part of the Southern Society, which was transformed into the Slavic Council.

The revolt, scheduled for the summer of 1826, was accelerated by the death of Alexander I. The atmosphere of "interregnum" and the threat of exposure forced the Decembrists to change the date of the uprising to December 14, 1825.

After the defeat of the Decembrist revolt in St. Petersburg, the Southern Society organized the uprising of Chernigov Regiment revolt, which, however, was also quickly defeated. The leaders of the Society, including Pestel, were arrested, and the Southern Society finally ceased to exist, its members being exiled to Siberia or executed.

== See also ==
- Secret society

== Bibliography ==
- Yarmolinsky, Avrahm (2014) [1956]. Road to Revolution: A Century of Russian Radicalism. Princeton, New Jersey: Princeton University Press. ISBN 978-0-691-61041-2. OCLC 890439998.
- Kiyanskaya, Oksana Ivanovna (2015). Декабристы (in Russian). Moscow: Молодая гвардия. ISBN 978-5-235-03803-5. OCLC 981537416.
- Kazmyrchuk, Hryhoriy; Kiyanskaya, Oksana; Latysh, Yurii; Kazmyrchuk, Mariia (2005). Декабристи в Україні: дослідження й матеріали (in Ukrainian). Vol. 4. Kyiv: National Academy of Sciences of Ukraine. ISBN 966-02-3807-X.
- Kazmyrchuk, Hryhoriy; Kiyanskaya, Oksana; Latysh, Yurii (2009). Декабристи в Україні: дослідження й матеріали (in Ukrainian). Vol. 6. Kyiv: National Academy of Sciences of Ukraine. ISBN 978-966-96992-4-4.
- Latysh, Yurii; Kazmyrchuk, Mariia; Ehrlich, Serguey; Shkerin, Vladimir; Kazmyrchuk, Hryhoriy; Gotovtseva, Anastasia; Grandhaye, Julie; Pertseva, Tamara; Levchenko, Valery; Vasilieva, Elena; Sukhovenko, Inna; Suzdal, Marina; Safonov, Mikhail; Matkhanova, Natalia; Ilyin, Pavel; Rabow-Edling, Susanna; Lastovsky, Valery; Kiyanskaya, Oksana; Balakhnina, Valeria; Komarova, Tamara (2012). Декабристи в Україні: дослідження й матеріали (in Ukrainian). Vol. 7. Kyiv: National Academy of Sciences of Ukraine.
- Hrushevsky, Mykhailo; Efremov, Sergey; Bagaliy, Dmitry; Jaworski, Matthew; Hermaise, Osip; Rybakov, Ivan; Romanovsky, Victor; Oxman, Julian; Hnatyuk, Vladimir (2011). "Українські декабристи чи декабристи на Україні?": Рух декабристів очима істориків 1920-х років (in Ukrainian). Kyiv: Logos. ISBN 978-966-171-357-3.
- Latysh, Yurii (2014). Декабристи в Україні. Історіографічні студії (in Ukrainian). Kyiv: Logos. ISBN 978-966-171-800-4.
