= Chernigov Regiment revolt =

1826 rebellion

- Part of the Decembrist revolt
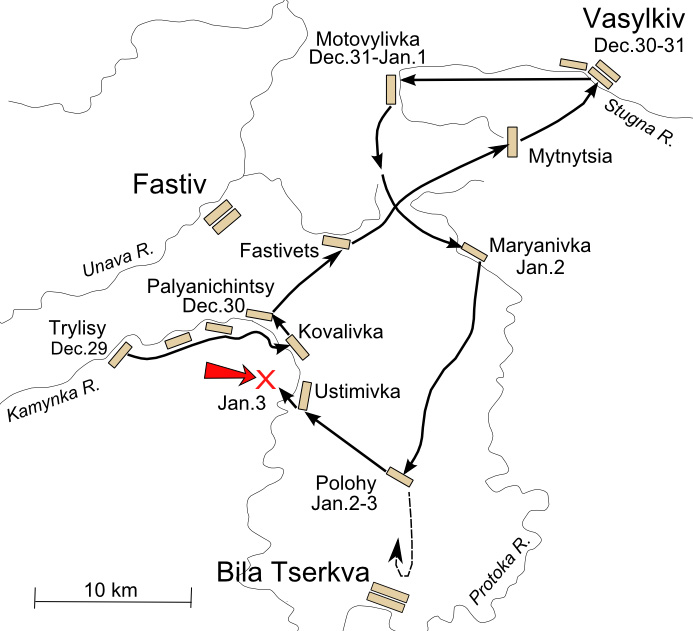
Date	January 10 [O.S. December 30] – January 15 [O.S. January 3] 1826
Location	Kiev Governorate, Ukraine
Result	Government victory

Belligerents
(Russian Empire) Southern Society of the Decembrists	Russian Empire

Commanders and leaders
Sergey Muravyov-Apostol (executed); Mikhail Bestuzhev-Ryumin (executed)	Friedrich Caspar von Geismar

Strength
1,000	400

Casualties and losses
Around 80	None

The Chernigov Regiment revolt was the second and the last major armed conflict of the Decembrist revolt in the former Russian Empire. The revolt unfolded January 10 [O.S. December 29] – January 15 [O.S. January 3] 1826 in Ukraine between Kiev and Bila Tserkva.

After the news of the rebels' defeat in Saint Petersburg reached Ukraine, the radical Decembrist officers incited the Chernigov infantry regiment against the government. The rebels marched from Trylisy north-east to Vasylkiv and reached one thousand men in strength. Uncertain about their strategy, rebel leaders camped in Motovilovka, while the government seized the initiative and mobilized its forces in pursuit. The rebels dropped their initial plans of taking over Kiev or Brusilov and marched south to Polohy and back to their starting point at Trylisy. Their retreat was checked by a 400-strong loyalist unit near Kovalivka. Demoralized rebel soldiers lost around 80 men to artillery fire and surrendered without resistance.

According to Hugh Seton-Watson, it was "the first and the last political revolt by Army officers" in Russia: Nicholas I and his successors eradicated liberalism in the troops and secured their unconditional loyalty.

== Background ==
In 1820 the Semenovsky Regiment of the Russian Imperial Guard was disbanded for a single incident of insubordination. Semyonovsky officers Alexander Vadkovsky, Mikhail Bestuzhev-Ryumin and others were demoted to the Army units stationed in Ukraine. In 1821 colonel Pavel Pestel, a radical member of a conspiracy ring now known as the Decembrists, was transferred to Tulchyn, Ukraine. Pestel and the Semyonovsky Regiment exiles recruited and indoctrinated a secret society of disgruntled Army officers. In the same year it split with the Northern Decembrists of Saint Petersburg and assumed the title of Southern Society but by 1823 Pestel's influence brought the two groups back together. A third society, the United Slavs, operated in Ukraine in alliance with the Southern Society. Second Army commander Hans Karl von Diebitsch, the imperial government and tsar Alexander I himself received reliable but fragmented information on the scope of conspiracy in the troops. No arrests were made until Alexander's death in Taganrog on December 1 [O.S. November 19] 1825.

Chernigov Regiment of foot was actually based in the Kiev Governorate, halfway between Kiev and Bila Tserkva. Regimental headquarters were located in Vasylkiv on Stuhna River. Companies of the regiment were scattered in the villages west of Vasylkiv, along the Kamyanka River. These villages, from Trylisy in the west to Ustimivka in south-east, form a continuous band of settlements along Kamyanka, and are connected by roads to Bila Tserkva in the south and Fastivets, Mytnytsia, Vasylkiv and Kiev in the north. The soldiers lived individually in peasant's huts, literally "off the country". This helped the Decembrists in agitating enlisted men one by one without raising suspicion, but in the decisive hour prevented them from assembling the whole force in short time.

Regiment commander colonel Goebel was not involved in the conspiracy and was not aware of it. His immediate subordinate, battalion commander Sergey Muravyov-Apostol, was Pestel's second in command in the Southern Society. Company commanders Veniamin Solovyov, Anastasy Kuzmin and Mikhail Schepilo were active members of the United Slavs. The regiment was literally infested with rebel officers at all levels. Rebel officers also infiltrated nearby Aktyrka, Alexopol, Kremenchug and Poltava regiments although to a lesser extent. Muravyov-Apostol counted on "allied" units stationed in Zhitomir and Brusyliv in the west and in Bila Tserkva to the south, although in real life these units remained on the government's side.

== Outbreak ==
Alexander's death interrupted the Decembrists' plans and forced them to act immediately. December 26 [O.S. December 14] 1825, on the day of the accession of Nicholas I, they launched a military coup in Saint Petrersburg. It failed at a cost of 1,271 lives, mostly civilians. In an unrelated move Diebitsch arrested Pestel on December 25 [O.S. December 13]. The Decembrists in Ukraine panicked but did not act, hoping that the arrest was an isolated episode, and that their ringleader will keep silence. Ten days later they received the news of a failed revolt and mass arrests in Saint Petersburg.

January 6 [O.S. December 26] Sergey Muravyov-Apostol, Pestel's second-in-command in the Southern Society, left his station in Vasylkiv to meet general Loggin Rot and Decembrist Mikhail Bestuzhev-Ryumin, in Zhitomir. Lieutenant Andreevich departed to Radomyshl to incite the Alexopol Regiment. Muravyov-Apostol barely escaped an arrest warrant against him which was delivered to Vasylkiv on the next day. Bestuzhev-Ryumin managed to get through to Muravyov-Apostol first and warned him of a manhunt. The two conspirators were put back by Artamon Muravyov's refusal to join the revolt with his Aktyrka Regiment. The arrest party followed the fugitives through Zhitomir and Lyubar and finally arrested them in Trylisy January 8 [O.S. December 28].

Muravyov's associates Kuzmin, Schepilo, Solovyov and Sukhinov realized that now the ring narrowed around themselves and settled for an open revolt. They rushed to Trylesy and set Muravyov-Apostol and Bestuzhev-Ryumin free. Colonel Goebel was injured in a sword fight and left to bleed but survived. Soldiers of Kuzmin's 5th company of the Chernigov Regiment stationed in Trylisy supported their officers, and on the following day Muravyov-Apostol assumed command and declared an open revolt. Unlike the action in Saint Petersburg, where soldiers were lured into defending Constantine Pavlovich as the legitimate monarch, the Chernigov Regiment soldiers were clearly told of the anti-government, anti-monarchist nature of the revolt. They marched west to nearby Kovalivka and absorbed the 2nd company. December 30 the rebels' vanguard reached Vasylkiv.

Major Trukhin, the highest-ranking loyalist of the Chernigov regiment, attempted to quell the rebels and was lynched on the spot. Without further resistance the whole regiment united in an open revolt against monarchy. The rebels now counted one thousand men in strength, complete with regimental banner, purse and even their own chaplain Daniel Keyser but without field artillery. Their leaders divided over the course of action. The United Slavs pressed for immediate capture of Kiev, only one day's march away. Muravyov and Bestuzhev-Ryumin opposed immediate action until other regiments join the revolt. Their opinion prevailed. Muravyov issued orders to march west to Brusyliv, away from Kiev, to unite with "allied" Akhtyrka and Alexapol regiments.

== Defeat ==
January 12 [O.S. December 31] 1825 Chernigov Regiment left Vasylkiv for Brusyliv. In Motovylivka Muravyov-Amursky learnt that the Decemrists of Alexapol Regiment refused to join the revolt, which made further westward movement useless. Muravyov-Amursky ordered an overnight stop at Motovylivka and took his time evaluating the alternatives. He finally settled on Bila Tserkva, were his lieutenant Vadkovsky apparently had influence over fellow officers of the 17th Jägers Regiment. He was not aware that by this time Vadkovsky was already arrested and that the government moved the unstable 17th Jägers away from Bila Tserkva. Meanwhile, the unexpected stopover and mounting uncertainty demoralized both enlisted men and career officers. Officers Apostol-Kegich, Mayevsky, Meschersky and Petin, who willfully joined the revolt, now deserted it. Soldiers indulged in harassing local Jews. The United Slavs managed to incite local Ukrainian peasants, but their support could not compensate for lack of strategy.

January 13 [O.S. January 1] Muravyov-Apostol led the regiment south to Bila Tserkva. By the end of the next day they reached Polohy where Sukhinov arranged a forward scouting party to Bila Tserkva. The scouts brought back fearful news that the 17th Jägers relocated to Skvira, a full day's march west of Bila Tserkva. The government now seized the initiative and removed unstable troops from the area. Muravyov-Apostol could now count only on fellow Decembrists in Zhitomir. The rebels turned again, this time heading north-west through the same Kamyanka valley which they left four days ago. Meanwhile, more officers deserted the regiment and discipline among the ranks was failing.

January 15 [O.S. January 3] the regiment left Polohy for Trylisy. Halfway between Ustimivka and Kovalivka the rebels marched head-on into government troops led by Friedrich Caspar von Geismar. Geismar had around 400 men – four squadrons of hussars with two field cannon. Artillery quickly brought rebels into submission. Sergey Muravyov-Apostol was wounded by the first canister shot, Solovyov saved him from immediate lynching by demoralized soldiers. 869 rebels surrendered without offering any resistance: government force had not suffered a single casualty. Rebels lost 60 soldiers, three officers and twelve civilians. Ippolit Muravyov-Apostol and Anastasy Kuzmin shot themselves.

== Punishment ==
Immediately after suppression of the revolt the loyalists arrested the officers involved in the revolt, including those who deserted the rebels in Motovylivka. More arrests followed as the prisoners in Saint Petersburg reported their connections, real or imaginary. All commissioned officers were transported to the Peter and Paul Fortress in Saint Petersburg and faced the same investigators and judges as the Saint Peterburg Decembrists.

The court in Saint Petersburg pronounced its statement July 9, 1826. Of 121 prisoners found guilty, 61 belonged to the Northern Society, 60 to the Southern Society and the United Slavs, although only a small fraction of them was directly involved in the revolt. Thirty-six Decembrists were sentenced to death. Nicholas commuted most of the sentences, although in an indiscriminate manner inconsistent with each individual's guilt. Five were actually hanged, including the Chernigov Regiment leaders Sergey Muravyov-Apostol and Mikhail Bestuzhev-Ryumin. Others received sentences ranging from demotion to Army service to life in Siberia. In 1828 one of the Chernigov Regiment veterans, Ivan Sukhinov, was indicted in an attempted prison riot and committed suicide. Prosecution of the Decembrists, most of them ethnic Russian nobles, by a government party led by ethnic Germans (Geismar, Benckendorff, Osten-Sacken) gave rise to rumours of a German conspiracy.

Enlisted soldiers were punished right where they were detained. February 4 [O.S. January 22] 1826 a commission based in Bila Tserkva reviewed 987 individual cases of Chernigov Regiment soldiers and found 51 of them innocent. 106 men were run through the gauntlet. Three of them received a lethal dose of "twelve runs" (12,000 strikes) and died, 103 survived with 1,000 to 4,000 strikes. They and the rest of the soldiers were transferred to serve in the action of the Caucasian War.

Chaplain father Daniel was detained in a monastery for two months and then stripped of his nobility and clerical title and sent for hard work to Babruysk fortress. He was granted amnesty and a pension in 1858.

== Sources ==
- Gabayev, G. S. (1932, in Russian). Soldaty - uchastniki zagovora i vosstaniya dekabristov (Солдаты - участники заговора и восстания декабристов), in: Dekabristy i ih vremya (Декабристы и их время), vol. 4. Moscow: VOPSP.
- Mazour, Anatole (1937). The first Russian revolution, 1825: the Decembrist movement, its origins, development, and significance. Stanford University Press. Reissue: ISBN 0-8047-0081-8, ISBN 978-0-8047-0081-8.
- Nechkina, Militsa (1984, in Russian). Dekabristy (Декабристы). Moscow: Nauka.
- Seton-Watson, Hugh (1988). The Russian empire, 1801–1917. Oxford University Press. ISBN 0-19-822152-5, ISBN 978-0-19-822152-4.
