= Pyotr Yakubovich =

Russian revolutionary and poet

Pyotr Filippovich Yakubovich
- Пётр Филиппович Якубович
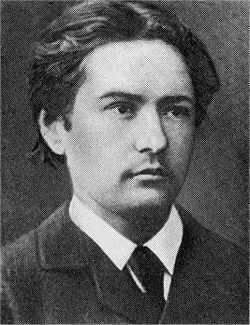
- Born: November 3, 1860; Isaevo, Valdaysky Uyezd, Novgorod Governorate, Russian Empire (now Bologovsky District, Tver Oblast, Russian Federation)
- Died: March 30, 1911 (aged 50); Udelnaya, Sankt-Peterburgsky Uyezd, Saint Petersburg Governorate, Russian Empire (now Vyborgsky District, Saint Petersburg, Russian Federation)
- Resting place: Literator Bridges, Volkovo Cemetery, Saint Petersburg
- Citizenship: Russian Empire

Pyotr Filippovich Yakubovich (Russian: Пётр Филиппович Якубович; November 3 [O.S. October 22] 1860 – March 30 [O.S. March 17/] 1911) was a Russian revolutionary, poet and member of Narodnaya Volya (People's Will Party) during the 1880s.

== Biography ==
Pyotr Yakubovich was born on November 3 [O.S. October 22] 1860 in landed property Isaevo, Valdaysky Uyezd, Novgorod Governorate, Russian Empire. From the nobility. His father, Philip Tarasovich Yakubovich (1817-1883), a retired captain, served as an officia.

He graduated from the Faculty of History and Philology of Petersburg University (1882). After graduating, he entered the Petersburg Department of Narodnaya Volya. He was an organizer of the "Young People's Will Party" as well as its leader and ideologist.

From the age of 24, he spent many years of his life in prisons and katorga. He spent three years in the Peter-Paul Fortress for participation in political movements and was subjected to penal servitude in Siberia from 1887 to 1899. He served his sentence in the Kara katorga. In 1890 he was transferred to the Akatuy katorga. Since September 1895, he was at the settlement in Kurgan.

He published in 1895 — under the pseudonym L. Melshin — a series of essays life for the prisoners in Siberia: V Mire Otverzjennych (In the World of the Outcasts), and Pasynki zhizni (Life's Stepchildren).

In 1899 he received permission to live in Kazan, and in 1903 - in Udelnaya, Sankt-Peterburgsky Uyezd, Saint Petersburg Governorate.

According to an article on Leon Trotsky by David North (referring to Yakubovich's poems) "His poems, which evoked the heroism and tragedy of the doomed struggle of the revolutionary terrorists against tsarism, made a deep moral impact upon the youth of the 1890s."

For a list of some of his other works, see "The Lied and Art Song Texts Page" on him.
