= Sergei Petrovich Trubetskoy =

Russian prince and Decembrist

- Серге́й Петро́вич Трубецко́й
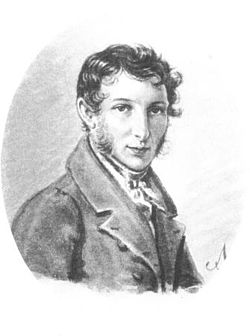
- Born: 29 August 1790; Nizhny Novgorod, Russian Empire
- Died: 22 November 1860 (aged 70); Moscow, Russian Empire

Prince Sergei Petrovich Trubetskoy (Russian: Серге́й Петро́вич Трубецко́й; 29 August 1790 – 22 November 1860) was one of the organizers of the Decembrist movement. Close to Nikita Mikhailovich Muravyov in his views, he was declared the group's leader on the eve of the December 26 uprising in 1825 but failed to appear, and instead sought refuge in the Austrian embassy.

== Early years ==
Trubetskoy was born in the noble Trubetskoy family. His father was Prince Pyotr Sergeyevich Troubetzkoy (1760–1817). His mother, Daria (d. 1796), was a daughter of the Georgian prince Alexander Bakarovich Gruzinsky.

Troubetzkoy received home education, in 1806 he started attending lectures at Moscow University. In 1808 he entered Russian Imperial Guard’s Semyonovsky Life Guards Regiment. As a soldier, he participated in all significant battles of the Sixth Coalition campaign in 1812-1814 including the Battle of Borodino, the Battle of Maloyaroslavets, the Battle of Lützen, the battle of Bautzen, and the Battle of Kulm, and received many orders. In the Battle of Leipzig he was badly wounded. After the war, he continued military service and in 1821 he was promoted to colonel.

== Decembrists ==
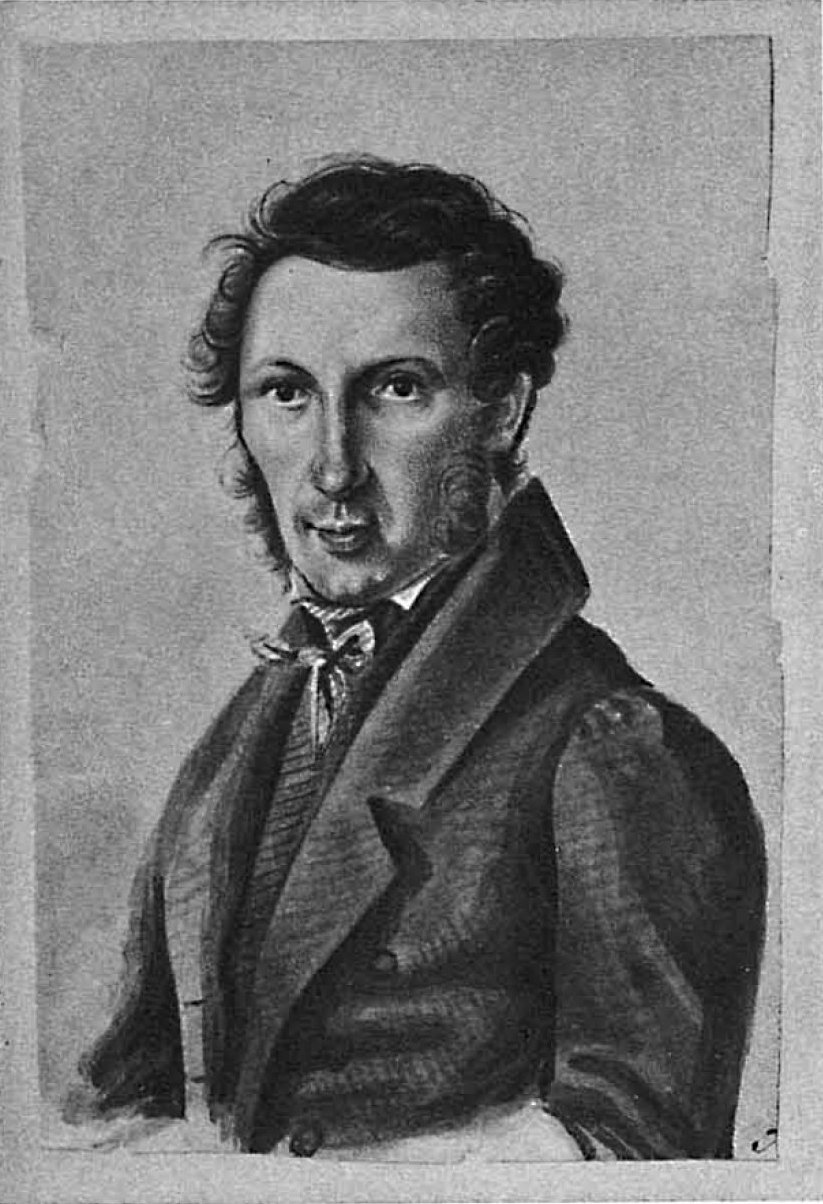
Trubetskoy in the 1830s, by Nikolay Bestuzhev

After the war Trubetskoy became a Freemason, a member of the Lodge of the Three Virtues. He was among the founders of the first proto-Decembrists societies - the Union of Salvation (1816) and later the Union of Prosperity (1819). The two unions were largely based on freemasonry. They sought gradual improvement of the Russian Empire, but had not adopted some goals the Decembrists did later: complete abolition of serfdom, introduction of constitution and constitutionally secured liberties, abolition of privileges of upper estates of the realm. In 1819 Trubetskoy went abroad for treatment. When he returned in 1821 he found the Union had ceased to exist. Trubetskoy was one of the founders and leaders of the Northern Society. Trubestkoy advocated Constitutional monarchy, but other Decembrists desired revolution, to execute the tsar and establish a republic (e.g. Ryleev and Pestel). He was elected "dictator" but did not come to Senate Square, most probably because he expected the revolt to fail.

He was arrested the next day at the apartments of Count Ludwig Lebzeltern, his brother-in-law and the Austrian Empire's minister to St. Petersburg.

== Katorga and exile ==
Trubetskoy was sentenced to death but the sentence was changed to katorga for life in Nerchinsk coal mines. Trubetskoy's wife Ekaterina Laval (a rich heiress of Ekaterina Kozitskaya's fortune) went to exile with him. Her feat (she voluntarily renounced all wealth and privileges and subjected herself to hard life in katorga) was subject of a famous poem by Nekrasov. In 1839 his family was allowed to live in exile in Irkutsk, and he eventually also received permission. In 1854 his wife died. In 1856, along with other surviving Decembrists, he was granted amnesty, his children were given their titles, and he was able to return from Siberia. He wrote memoirs which were published for the first time in 1863 by Alexander Herzen in London.

== See also ==
- Decembrist revolt
- Troubetzkoy
- Notes of Prince S. P. Trubetskoy (Saint Petersburg, 1906)
