= Akatuy =

Akatuy may refer to:

- Akatuy (village), a village in Siberia (Борзинский район Читинской области), a place of the Akatuy katorga
- Akatuy katorga of Russian Empire
- Akatuy, Chuvash festival of land fertility (see Sabantuy)
