= Anastasia Bitsenko =

Russian revolutionary

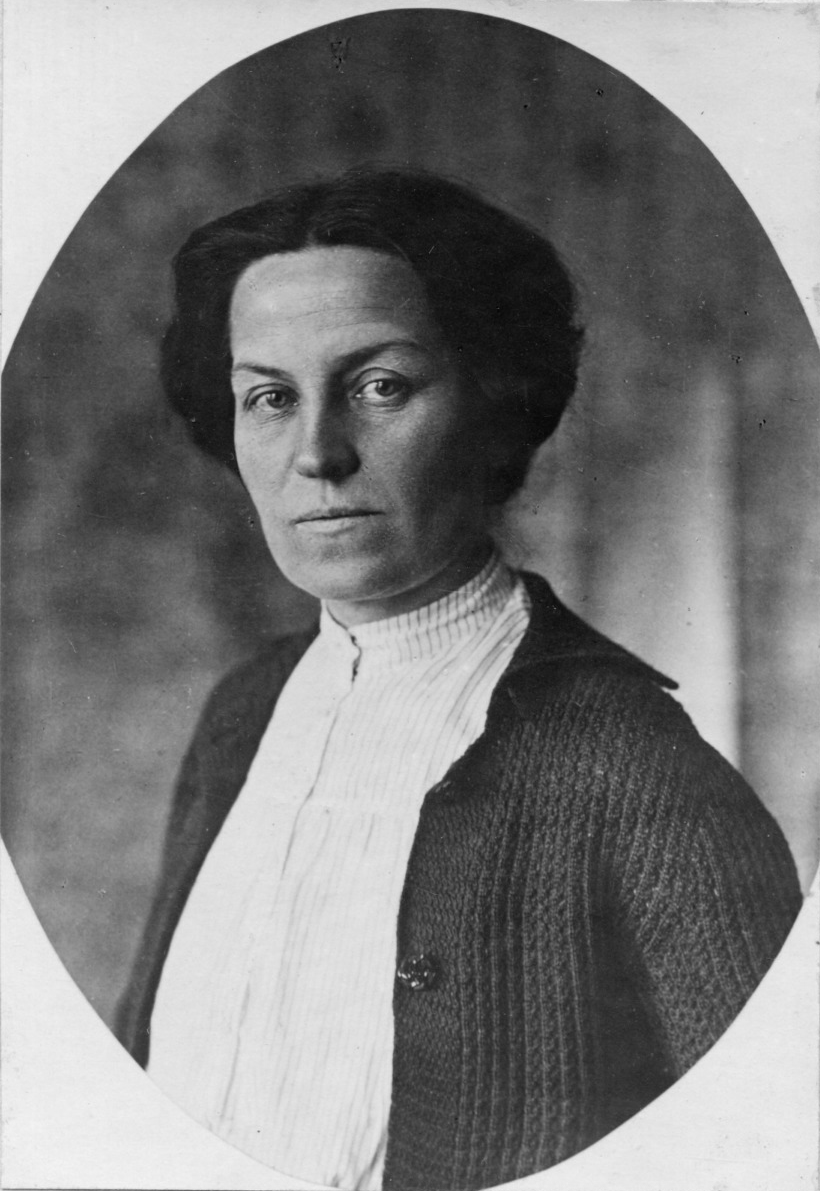
- Born: Anastasia Alekseevna Kameristaya (Note: Her maiden name is given according to the spelling adopted by Boniece (2010b, p. 180), which is also as recorded in the 1927 edition of the Great Soviet Encyclopedia (Большая советская энцйклопедия). According to the Russian Wikipedia article, however, it is spelt instead "Kamoristaya" (Камористая), and sometimes also "Kameritaya" (Камеритая) or "Kamerinskaya" (Камеринская); according to the Ucrainian Wikipedia article it is spelt Kamerista (Камериста); Maxwell spells it "Kameristkaya" (1990, p. 200).); 10 November 1875; Aleksandrovka, Bakhmutsky Uyezd, Yekaterinoslav Governorate, Russian Empire
- Died: 16 June 1938 (aged 62); Kommunarka shooting ground, Moscow Oblast, Soviet Union
- Occupation: Revolutionary
- Political party: Social Revolutionary Party; Left Socialist Revolutionary Party; Party of Revolutionary Communism; Russian Communist Party

Anastasia Alekseevna Bitsenko, née Kameristaya (Russian: Анастасия Алексеевна Биценко, née Камeристая; Ukrainian: Анастасія Олексіївна Біценко, née Камериста; 10 November 1875 – 16 June 1938) was a Narodnik-inspired, later Communist, Russian revolutionary. As a member of a socialist revolutionary (SR) flying combat detachment, she came to fame for assassinating the former Russian Minister of War Viktor Sakharov in 1905. After being held in detention for over 11 years, she was freed during the February Revolution and joined the Left Socialist-Revolutionaries. For her achievements, the party designated her as their representative within the Soviet delegation for the German-Russian peace negotiations in World War I, which resulted in the Treaty of Brest-Litovsk. She returned to Russia and held various Soviet party positions, before being executed during the Stalinist purges.

== Early life ==
Anastasia (Nastya) Kameristaya was born on 10 November 1875 in the small village of Aleksandrovka (now part of Donetsk) in the Bakhmutsky Uyezd of the Yekaterinoslav Governorate, Russian Empire. Born into a peasant family, she benefited "from the educational reforms of Tsar Alexander II [and] acquired enough schooling to qualify as a teacher" in primary schools. During a famine that spread across Russia in 1899, she organised a communal kitchen for the starving, hungry in Kazan. Later, she attended further courses in Moscow in order to qualify to teach at the secondary level as well.

== Revolutionary activities ==
During her studies, she got drawn into the emerging Russian revolutionary scene, probably fostered by meeting her future husband Mikhail Stepanovich Bitsenko, who was a fellow student at the Moscow Agricultural Institute and a socialist revolutionary (SR) agitator. In 1901 they were picked up by the police for participating in students disorders and banished from Moscow to the remote Irkutsk province. Returning to European Russia in 1903, they "assisted in the founding of an SR organisation in Smolensk", but they probably broke up later that year, when Anastasiya left Smolensk for St. Petersburg, while "Mikhail continued to work with the Smolensk SRs." They never reunited again, but she maintained his surname throughout her life.

In St. Petersburg, Anastasiya became a full-time activist of the SR party and was involved in a female terrorist group that aimed to assassinate the Minister of the Interior, Vyacheslav von Plehve. Betrayed by an informer, she was arrested in late January 1904 and kept in preliminary detention until mid-March 1905 when she was exiled to Vologda near the Arctic Circle. After just one month in the settlement she escaped abroad, to Geneva, but in August returned to Moscow, as a member of the Moscow committee of the SR party, responsible for organising railroad workers.

In the following November she joined an SR flying combat detachment. (The central SR Combat Organization had been temporarily disbanded and the PSR's central committee had decided to discontinue terror after the issue of the October Manifesto. Many members and groups, however, would not abide by the party's decision). Bitsenko volunteered to lead a terrorist plot against the "butcher of Saratov", as revolutionaries would call ex-Minister of War, Viktor Sakharov, who had been dispatched to the Saratov province in order to repress peasant unrests. On 22 November Bitsenko managed to slip into governor Piotr Stolypin's palace in Saratov and got herself admitted into the presence of General Sakharov. During their meeting she immediately laid down the death sentence written by the local SR committee onto Sakharov's desk and then shot him dead. She was captured, brought to trial, and initially sentenced to be hanged; but her punishment was soon commuted to penal labour for life to be served at the Nerchinsk katorga in Transbaikal.

She was sent to Siberia in the company of five other prominent female SR terrorists, including Maria Spiridonova. The group was sometimes called the Shesterka ("Six") and they had gained enormous popularity for their feats. Their slow journey by train lasted around a month and turned into some kind of "triumphal progress", as the train was met at every stop by growing crowds of sympathizers. The revolutionaries (with Spiridonova ahead) would greet and talk with them as long as possible, expounding the SR political program. Bitsenko spent the following eleven years in the penal colonies of Akatuy and Maltsev in the Nerchinsk katorga.

== Soviet Russia ==
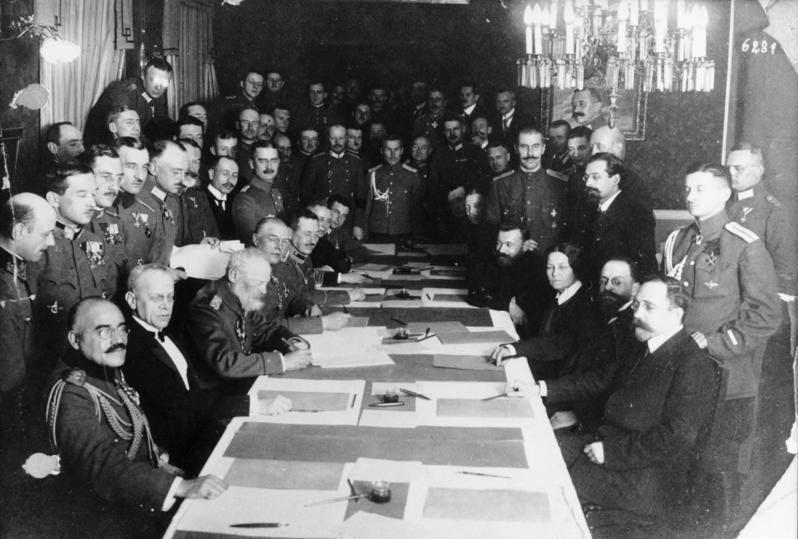
Signing of the armistice between Russia and Germany. Bitsenko is on the right.

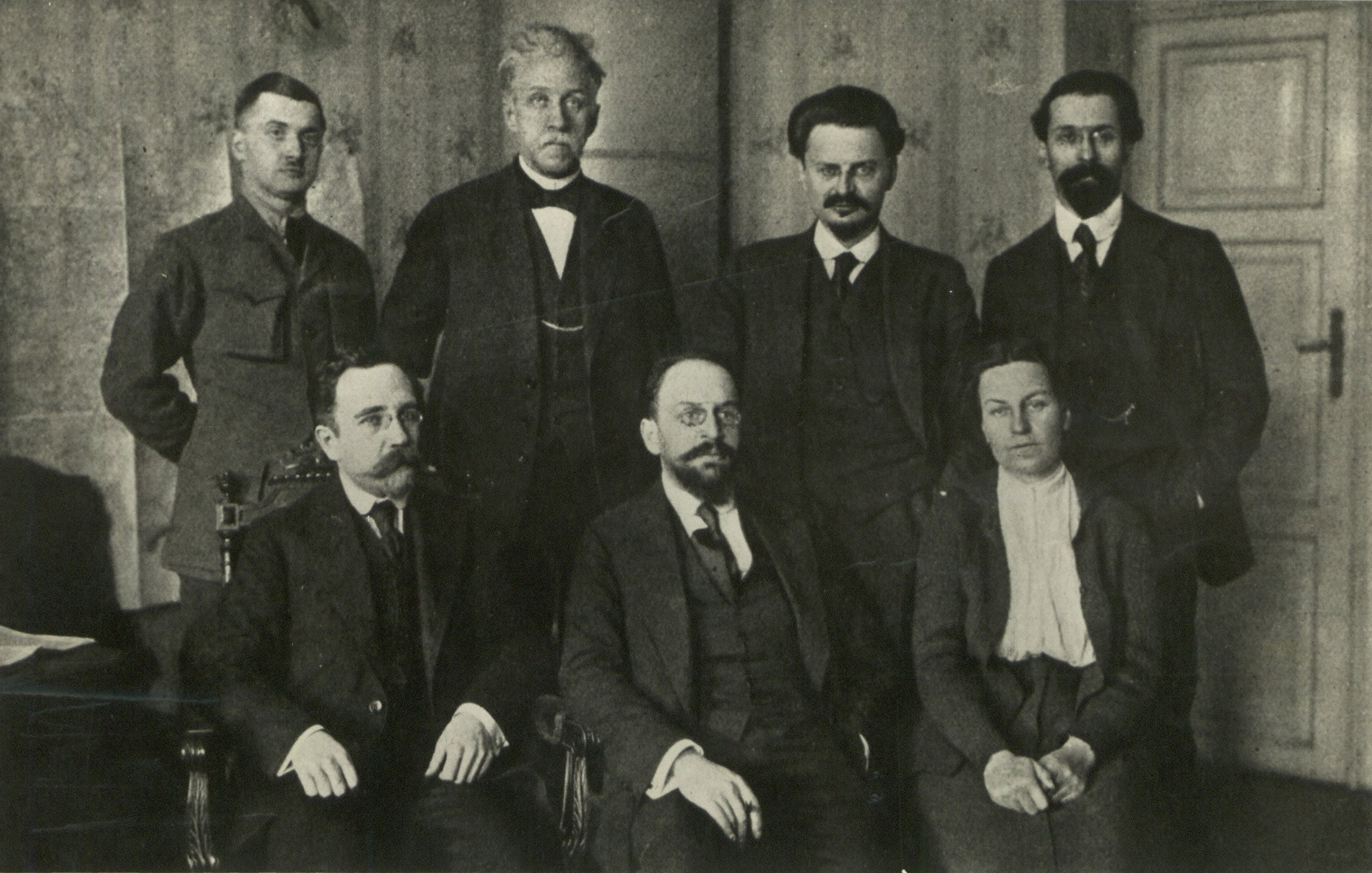
Soviet delegation at Brest-Litovsk. Sitting, from the left: Lev Kamenev, Adolph Joffe, Anastasia Bitsenko. Standing: Vladimir Lipskiy, Pēteris Stučka, Leon Trotsky, Lev Karakhan.

As a result of the February Revolution in 1917 she was freed and returned to political action within the Socialist Revolutionary Party firstly in Chita, and then Moscow, where she was elected again to the regional party committee. She participated during the October political uprising as a member of the Petrograd Military Revolutionary Committee and then joined the Left Socialist-Revolutionaries, rising through the ranks of the new party. She was a member of the Central Committee of the Left SRs, of the praesidium of the Moscow Soviet, and the Central Executive Committee of the Soviets.

As reward for her efforts in the party, she was designated to be one of the seven members of the Soviet Delegation for the German-Soviet peace talks for World War I in Brest-Litovsk. Bitsenko was the only woman present during the negotiations; her appointment was a political manoeuvre by the Bolsheviks to give representation to the rival Left Socialist-Revolutionaries. The talks concluded with the signing of the Treaty of Brest-Litovsk, a hugely unpopular peace treaty which ended the fighting on the Eastern Front, but was rejected by the Left SRs.

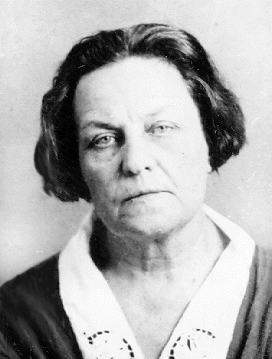
Anastasia Bitsenko in a Stalinist prison, photo from the investigation file.

Bitsenko returned to Russia and continued her party activities. Being strongly opposed to the rupture with the Bolsheviks, she co-founded the splinter Party of Revolutionary Communism in September 1918. In November she joined the newly renamed Russian Communist Party (Bolsheviks), later holding various political and committee positions in the Soviet Union. After the death of Lenin, widespread purges were carried out within the ranks of the Communist Party by the new Soviet supreme leader Joseph Stalin, and she became one of the many targets. Accused of being a member of a terrorist organization, she was put on trial and sentenced to death. On 16 June 1938 she was shot and buried at the Kommunarka shooting ground. The Soviet authorities acquitted her posthumously in 1961.

== Bibliography ==
- Boniece, Sally A. (2010a). "The Spiridonova Case, 1906: Terror, Myth and Martyrdom". In Anemone, Anthony (ed.). Just Assassins: The Culture of Terrorism in Russia. Northwestern University Press. pp. 127–151. ISBN 978-0810126923.
- Boniece, Sally A. (2010b). "The Shesterka of 1905-06: Terrorist Heroines of Revolutionary Russia". Jahrbücher für Geschichte Osteuropas. 58 (Modern Times - Terrorism in Late Imperial Russia). Franz Steiner Verlag: 172–191. doi:10.25162/jgo-2010-0010. JSTOR 41052426. S2CID 148313433.
- Hochschild, Adam (2011). To End All Wars: A Story of Loyalty and Rebellion, 1914-1918. Houghton Mifflin Harcourt. ISBN 978-0547549217.
- Kizny, Tomasz; Roynette, Dominique (2013). La Grande Terreur en URSS 1937-1938 (in French). Les éditions noir sur blanc. ISBN 978-2-88250-303-9.
- Knight, Amy (1979). "Female Terrorists in the Russian Socialist Revolutionary Party". Russian Review. 38 (2 (April)): 139–159. doi:10.2307/128603. JSTOR 128603.
- Maxwell, Margaret (1990). Narodniki women: Russian women who sacrificed themselves for the dream of freedom. Pergamon Press. ISBN 0-08-037461-1.
- "Shots in Moscow (List of nearly 12,000 Moscow victims of terror)" (in Russian). Последний адрес (Last address). 29 October 2004.
- Schmidt, Otto Yulevich, ed. (1927). Great Soviet Encyclopedia. Vol. 6. Moscow: Sovetskaya Entsiklopediya.
- Steinberg, Isaac Nachman (1935). Spiridonova: Revolutionary Terrorist. Methuen.
- Tooze, Adam (2015). The Deluge: The Great War and the Remaking of Global Order 1916-1931. Penguin Books. ISBN 978-0141032184.
- Ulam, Adam Bruno (1974). Expansion and coexistence: Soviet foreign policy, 1917-73. Praeger Publishing. ISBN 9780275886301.
