= Sergey Muravyov-Apostol =

Russian Imperial Lieutenant Colonel

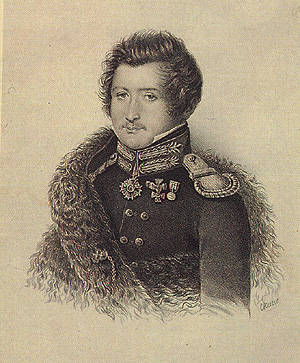
Sergey Muravyov-Apostol

Sergey Ivanovich Muravyov-Apostol (Russian: Серге́й Ива́нович Муравьёв-Апо́стол) (9 October [O.S. 28 September] 1796 – 25 July [O.S. 13 July] 1826) was a Russian Imperial Lieutenant Colonel and one of the organizers of the Decembrist revolt.

He was one of five Decembrists executed for their roles in attempting to reform the Russian autocracy towards a constitutional form of government.

== Early life and military career ==
Sergei was born in Saint Petersburg, the fourth son of Russian diplomat Ivan Muravyov-Apostol. His mother, Anna, was the daughter of a Serbian general, Simon Crnojević. Four of his relatives also became Decembrists: his brothers Ippolit Muravyov-Apostol and Matvey Muravyov-Apostol and his cousins Nikita Muravyov and Artamon Muravyov.

Sergei spent his childhood in Hamburg and Paris, then graduated from the Saint Petersburg Institute of Road Engineers before joining in the Russian Army.

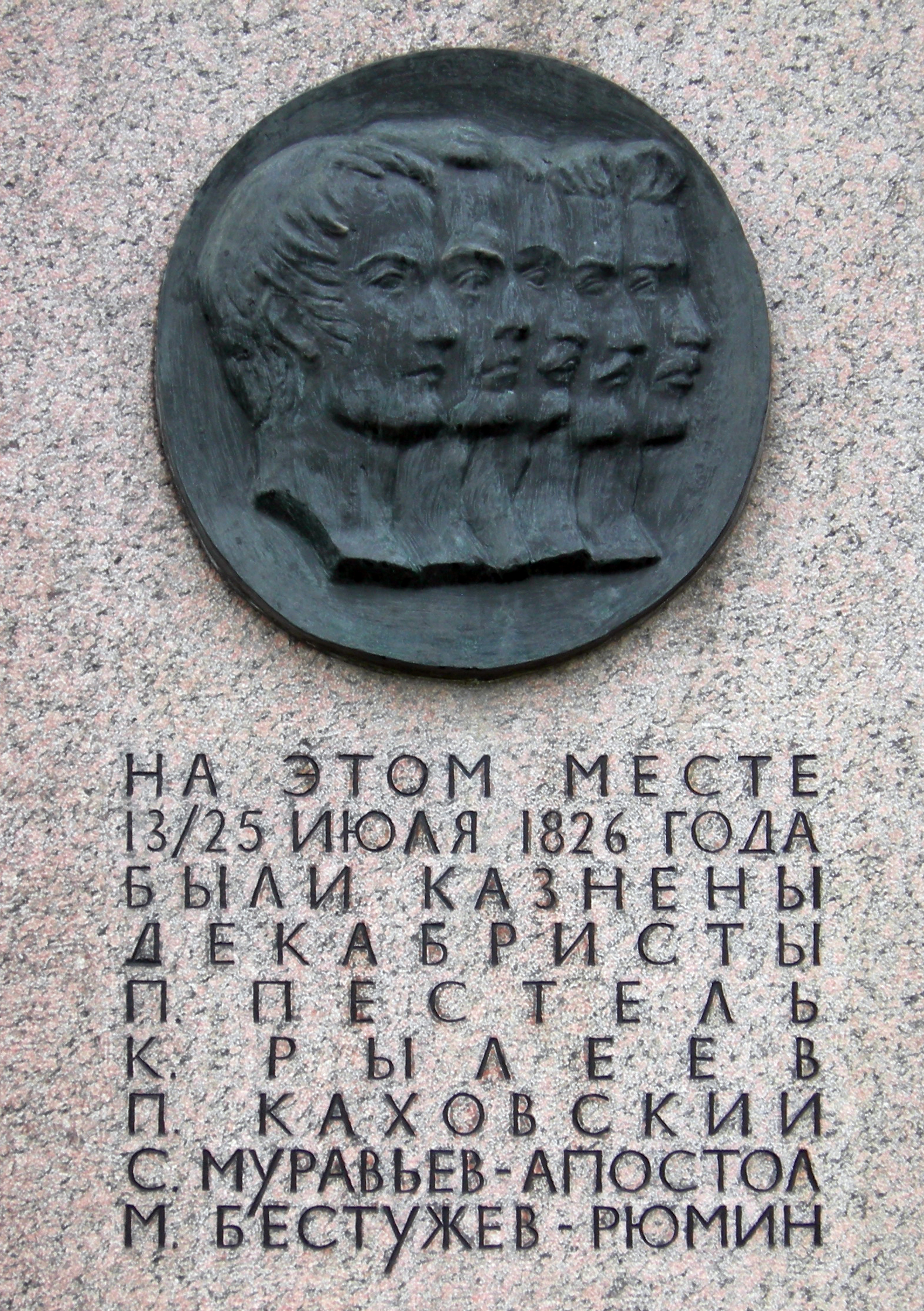
Plaque in remembrance of the five executed Decembrists. Muravyov's name appears second from the bottom.

He was a veteran of the Patriotic War of 1812. He took part in the Battle of Vitebsk, the Battle of Borodino, the Battle of Tarutino, the Battle of Maloyaroslavets, the Battle of Berezina (for which he was awarded the Golden Sword for Bravery), the Battle of Leipzig (1813), and the Battle for Paris (1814), for which he was awarded the Order of St. Anna, second degree.

After the Napoleonic Wars he served as a poruchik, and later as a captain of the Russian Imperial Guard, Semyonovsky Regiment. After the uprising of the Semyonovsky regiment in 1820 he transferred as a Lieutenant Colonel to the Poltava Regiment, and in 1822 to the Chernigov Regiment.

== Decembrist Uprising ==
In 1817 and 1818, he was a Freemason, a member and a ritual-keeper of the "Three Virtues" Lodge. He was one of the founders of pre-Decembrist secret societies Union of Salvation and Union of Welfare, and a director of the Decembrist Southern Society. He was the coordinator of correspondence between the Southern Society and the pro-Polish Society of United Slavs. Muravyov-Apostol was the author of the Decembrists Сatechesis and a very articulate supporter of establishing a republic and abolishing serfdom in Russia.

In 1825, he led the uprising of the Chernigov regiment. He was arrested on 10 January 1826 [O.S. 29 December 1825] then freed by his fellow officers. He led an insurgency against government forces on 20 January [O.S. 8 January] 1826, when he was critically wounded by a canister shot. According to the legend, his wounds prevented him from staying in the saddle. So he ordered to be fastened to his horse by ropes so as to lead the desperate cavalry attack on the government artillery battery. The attack was unsuccessful and he was captured.

He was delivered to Saint Petersburg and was one of the five Decembrists sentenced to quartering, but later this sentence was replaced with hanging. He was executed along with the other 4 in Peter and Paul Fortress on 25 July [O.S. 13 July] 1826.

He was interred with the other four in a secret grave on Goloday Island, though some conspiracy theorists believed that the men were not hanged but put on the island to starve. In the Soviet era, the island was renamed "Decembrists' Island" in memory of the executed men.

== See also ==
- Mikhail Bestuzhev-Ryumin
- Pyotr Kakhovsky
- Pavel Pestel
- Kondraty Ryleyev
