= Alexander Odoevsky =

Alexander Ivanovich Odoevsky
- Александр Иванович Одоевский
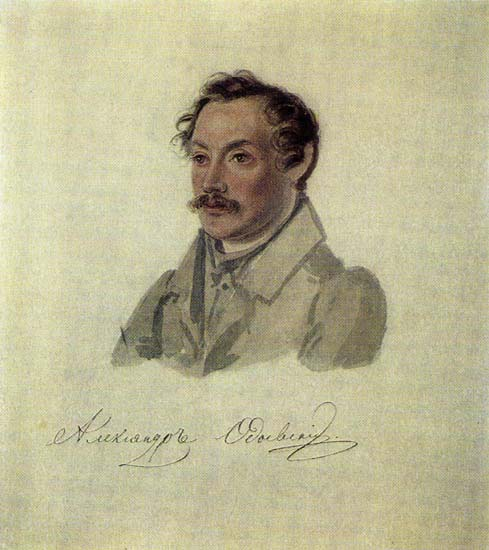
- Portrait by Nikolay Bestuzhev
- Born: 8 December 1802; Saint Petersburg, Russian Empire
- Died: 22 October 1839 (aged 36); Psezuape, Russian Empire
- Writing career
- Language: Russian
- Genres: Poetry, drama
- Notable work: Prophetic strings' igniting sounds

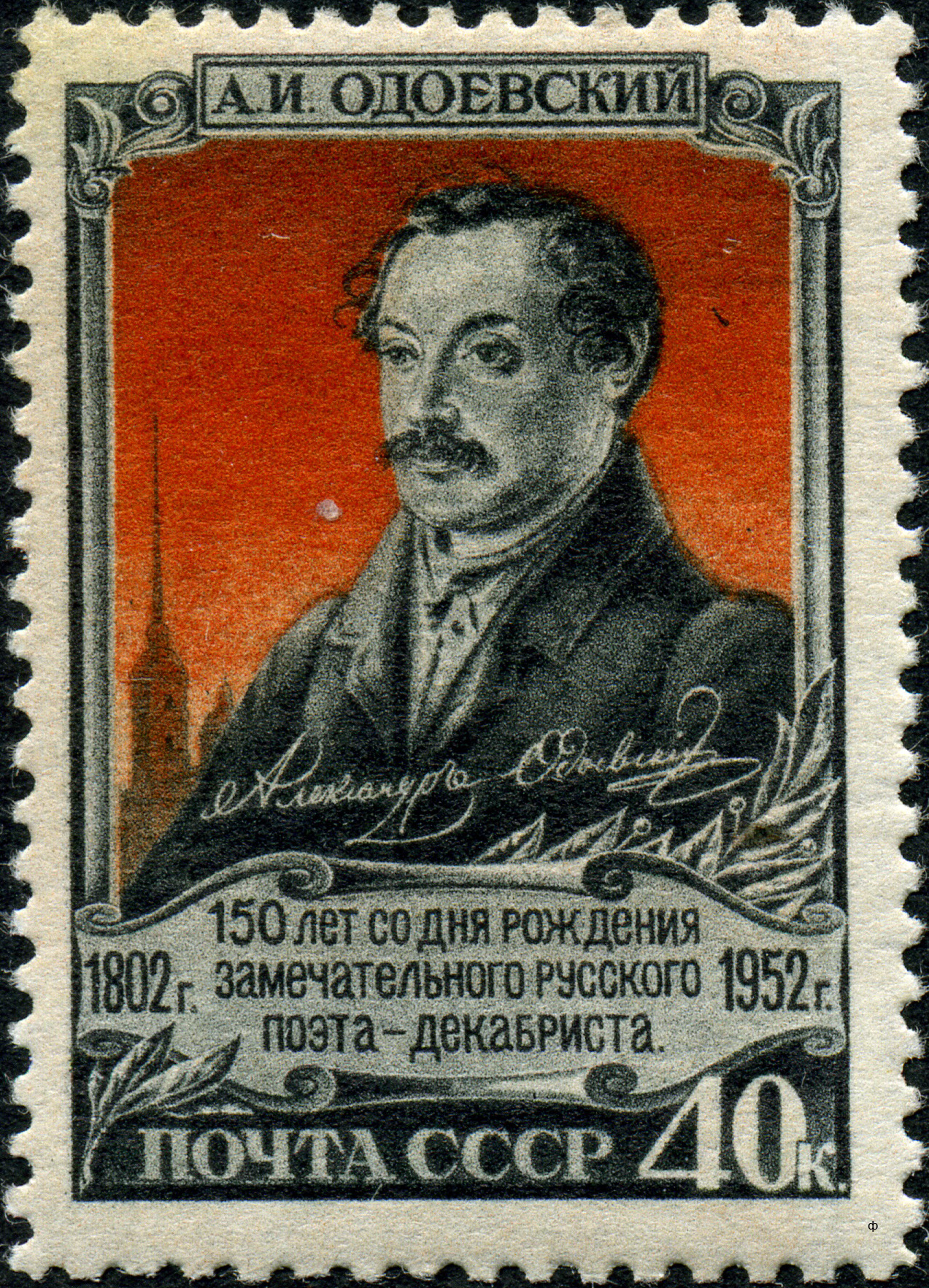
Odoevsky on a 1952 stamp

Alexander Ivanovich Odoevsky (Russian: Алекса́ндр Ива́нович Одо́евский, romanized: Aleksandr Ivanovich Odoevskiy, November 26 (December 8), 1802 – October 10 (22) or August 15 (27), 1839) was a Russian poet and playwright, one of the leading figures of the 1825 Decembrist revolt. One of Odoevsky's lines, "Iz iskry vozgoritsa plamya" (Из искры возгорится пламя, One spark will start a flame), has come down in history as a long-lasting slogan of the Russian revolutionary movement. It was chosen as a motto (signed as: the "Decembrists' reply to Pushkin") for the Lenin-founded newspaper Iskra, also giving the newspaper its title, which means "spark".

== Biography ==
Alexander Odoevsky was born in Saint Petersburg, to an old family of Russian aristocrats. He received a high quality home education and in 1821 joined the military. One of his best friends and a major influence was his relative, the playwright Aleksander Griboyedov. By 1825 Odoevsky had begun writing poetry, but few of his early works remained, The Ball (1825), a critique of high society life, being one of them.

In late 1824 Odoevsky joined the secret Northern Society and became part of its most radical contingent. On December 13, 1825, he supported Kondraty Ryleev who expressed the Society members' will to "give their lives to the first attempt at bringing freedom to Russia". On December 14 (25) Odoevsky was one of the commanders of the mutineers in the Senate Square where three thousand military men gathered to refuse to swear allegiance to the new Tsar, Nicholas I of Russia, proclaiming instead their loyalty to Grand Duke Constantine Pavlovich and the Russian Constitution. After the coup's failure he was arrested, sent to the Petropavlovskaya fortress, later convicted, sentenced to hard labour, and deported to Siberia. Odoevsky's best-known poems, including Fiery sounds of prophetic strings (Strun véshchikh plámennye zvúki) where his famous line "One spark will start a flame" comes from, were written in the late 1820s - early 1830s, first in prison in Petersburg, then at a Siberian factory he was sent to work in.

In the early 1833 Odoevsky was relieved from his sentence of hard labour and sent to a settlement in Irkutsk, then moved to Tobolsk. In August 1837 he found himself amongst several Decembrists who, by a special decree of Nicholas I, had been transferred to serve in the Caucasus. As a sentry in a Nizhegorodsky dragoon regiment, he forged close friendship with Mikhail Lermontov, an officer there, who responded to the news of Odoevsky's death in 1839 with a tribute ("I knew him. We wandered side by side...") that became famous in its own right.

In Odoevsky's lifetime only the play Saint Bernard was published (in Sovremennik 1838, Vol.X). In 1862 a volume of his collected poetry was published in Leipzig. Its expanded version came out in 1883 in Saint Petersburg.
