= Hippolyte Auger =

French writer, Russian translator and editor

Hippolyte Auger (born Hippolyte Augé; 25 May 1796 in Auxerre – 5 January 1881 in Menton), was a French writer, Russian translator, and editor of the Journal de Saint Pétersbourg.

== Biography ==
Hippolyte Auger was born in 1810. Being one of eleven children, he left his Bourgogne home at the age of fourteen, with the consent of his parents, to work in Paris. He found employment in a fabric shop owned by the famous textile magnate Ternaux. His teenage charm was employed mostly on men, including Russian soldiers who were present in Paris following the abdication of Napoleon in 1814. Having struck up friendships with four, who like him were devotees of the theatre, at the age of eighteen, Auger joined the army of Alexander I, and followed it back to Russia, virtually officer by officer. He served for eighteen months.

In St Petersburg, Auger befriended the aristocrat Filipp Vigel, a famous Russian memoirist and friend of Pushkin. Vigel supported Auger for most of his life and enabled him to get to know the imperial family and senior Russian nobility. With the return of Napoleon, Auger's position as a Frenchman in society became awkward, and following Vigel's advice he left St Petersburg.

In Vilna he met a dashing, aristocratic but reckless 26 year old Chevalier Guard officer Michael Lunin (1787-1845), later famous as a political philosopher, revolutionary, and Decembrist. For Auger it was love at first sight. As he later wrote in his memoirs: "the soft look, playful mouth, quick animation, imperturable manner offered, depending on the case, whatever you were looking for." Lunin wanted to distance himself from his father, and in 1816 they decided to head to South America to join Bolivar's Liberadores. They only got as far as Paris, where they shared a tiny garret, Lunin penning a novel about "False" Dmitri, a 17th-century pretender to the Russian throne who may have been gay, while Auger introduced him to Jesuits, Saint-Simonians, and theatre acquaintances.

After more than a year in France, Lunin, returned to Russia to inherit the fortune of his father and a political role. Obliged to earn a living, and having taken his first steps as an author in Russia, Auger remained in Paris. Alongside writing articles for the Paris journals, he tried his hand as a playwright, and achieved several successes.

In 1820 he met a wealthy Scottish diplomat, William Drummond of Logiealmond, a former ambassador to the courts of Constantinople and Naples. He became his secretary, assisting him with literary and archeological work in both England and Italy.

Back in France, in 1827 Auger befriended the Saint-Simonians Hippolyte Carnot and Philippe Buchez and took an active part in their conferences. He was also a friend and collaborator with, Ancelot, Balzac, Constant, Dumus, and other writers of the period. From 1837 he wrote a number of novels, and in 1839 the three volume Physiologie du théâtre into which he poured his deep knowledge of the contemporary stage. In the 1840s Auger chose to return to Russia for a writing project supported by the Tsar, a refutation of the famous work of Marquis de Custine, Russia in 1839. After the scandal of Custine's book had subsided, the Tsar decided it was best not to remind the public of it, and the project was abandoned, but Auger remained some time in St. Petersburg.

In 1844 he published a novel Fernande under the name of Alexandre Dumas, which went through seven editions.

Auger lived the last few years of his life in Paris, and on the French Riviera. In Toulon, he befriended the Justice of the Peace and bibliophile Alexandre Mouttet (1814-1901), who encouraged him to publish his memoirs.

Published posthumously in 1891 as Mémoires d'Auger (1810-1859, they were of remarkable frankness; his exploits confirming the presence of his name on the register of homosexuals then maintained by the Paris police.

While Auger was a writer of some celebrity during his lifetime, he has fallen into almost complete obscurity.

== Character ==
As his memoirs confirm, Auger had a talent for making friends everywhere, but he could also be tactless, and the majority of his friendships appear to have ended in quarrels and rupture. His life was one of constant movement as he seemed unable to settle anywhere, or form stable relationships. It has been suggested that his was just the type of personality to be attracted to Messianic all-embracing doctrines like Saint-Simonianism. No other follower wrote as much as he did or so enthusiastically applied its ideology to artistic questions.

== See also ==
- Michael Lunin
- Filipp Vigel

== Works ==
- Translation of Karamzine, Marpha, or conquered Novgorod (Marpha, ou Novgorod conquise ), (1818)
- Boris (Boris), (1819)
- Ivan VI or Forteres Schlusselbourg (Ivan VI ou la forteresse de Schlusselbourg ),(1819)
- Rienzi (Rienzi), (1820)
- Gabriel Vénance, story written by himself (Gabriel Vénance, histoire écrite par lui-même), (1818)
- Machiavelli's The Prince (Le Prince de Machiavel, ou la Romagne de 1502), (1834)
- Morals (Moralités), (1834)
- Women of the world and the woman artist (la Femme du monde et la femme artiste),(1837)
- All for Gold (Tout pour de l'or), (1839)
- Avdotia, a Russian novel (Avdotia, roman russe), (1846)
- An Untitled Novel (Un Roman sans titre), (1846)
- Marcel, or within a household (Marcel, ou l'intérieur d'un ménage), a play first performed in 1838 at the Gaiety Theatre
- Mademoiselle Bernard, or Paternal Authority (Mademoiselle Bernard, ou l'autorité paternelle), a vaudeville comedy (1838)
- The Crazy Girl (La Folle), a three act drama first performed in 1836 at the theatre of Ambigu-Comique
- Poor Mother, (Pauvre Mère) a drama in five acts, first performed in 1837 at the Gaiety Theatre
- Historical Essay on the Republic of San-Marino (Essai historique sur la république de San-Marino ), (1827)
- Theatre of Physiology (Physiologie du théâtre) (1840)
- Theatre Beaumarchais (Théâtre de Beaumarchais) (1842)

== Bibliography ==
- Tolley, Bruce A Saint-Simonian writer: Hippolyte Auger (1797-1881), Australian Journal of French Studies, Vol 11, Issue 3.
- Jean-claude Féray – « Hippolyte Auger » in Le Registre infamant, Quintes-feuilles, 2012, p. 168-178
