= Union of Salvation =

Union of Salvation Союз спасения
- Decembrists at the Senate Square
- Abbreviation: UoS
- Founder: Alexander Muravyov
- Founded: February 1816
- Dissolved: 1818
- Succeeded by: Union of Prosperity
- Ideology: Liberalism; Constitutionalism; Abolitionism
- Political position: Left-wing
- Movement: Decembrists

The Union of Salvation (Russian: Союз спасения, romanized: Sojuz spasenyja), formed in 1816, also known as the Society of True and Loyal Sons of the Fatherland (Russian: Общество истинных и верных сынов отечества, romanized: Obšestvo istinnych i vernych synov otečestva) since 1817, was the first secret political society of the Decembrists.

In 1816, at the initiative of Alexander Muravyov, a group of young officers of the Russian army founded the Union of Salvation (UoS). The first members had taken part in the Patriotic War of 1812 and in the foreign campaigns of 1813–1814. The UoS numbered some 30 members, including Nikita Muravyov, Sergey Muravyov-Apostol, Matvei Muravyov-Apostol, Sergei Trubetskoy, Ivan Yakushkin, Pavel Pestel, Yevgeni Obolensky, Ivan Pushchin, Mikhail Lunin and others. In 1817 they approved the UoS charter and changed the society's name to Society of True and Loyal Sons of the Fatherland. The UoS aimed at the abolition of serfdom and at the introduction of constitutional monarchy by means of armed revolt at the time of next emperor's succession to the throne. While preparing for the seizure of power, the UoS members had to try to expand the society's influence, secure key military and civil posts in government structures, and form public opinion.

The UoS members each belonged to one of three categories – bolyare (боляре), muzhi (мужи), and brat'ya (братья). The conspiracy operated in such a manner that only the first two categories of members knew the final purpose of the society. Low-ranking members had to obey high-ranking members implicitly. The admission of new members, as well as internal promotion, could only take place with the consent of the supreme council of the bolyare. Initiations and promotions were accomplished in strict accordance with a complex system of rituals and vows, adopted from Freemasonry.

There were two kind of groups within the UoS – radical and moderate. They debated over tactics and structure of the society, which some of them viewed as extremely secluded and complicated. UoS members came up with a number of regicide projects, but they were turned down due to the lack of funding and society's general unpreparedness for decisive action. In light of this, the majority of the members decided to vote for to dissolve the UoS and to establish a new organization, which would have more members and be more competent. They first created a transitional organization called Military Society ("Военное общество", or Voyennoye obshchestvo) and then in 1818 – the Union of Prosperity (Russian: Союз благоденствия, romanized: Soyuz blagodenstviya).

== See also ==
- Decembrist revolt
- Secret society

== Bibliography ==
- Yarmolinsky, Avrahm (2014) [1956]. Road to Revolution: A Century of Russian Radicalism. Princeton, New Jersey: Princeton University Press. ISBN 978-0691610412. OCLC 890439998.
