= Union of Prosperity =

Union of Prosperity Союз благоденствия
- Decembrists at the Senate Square
- Abbreviation: UoP
- Leader: Pavel Pestel
- Presidium: Korennaya Uprava
- Founder: Alexander Muravyov
- Founded: 1818
- Dissolved: 1821
- Preceded by: Union of Salvation
- Succeeded by: Northern Society; Southern Society
- Headquarters: Saint Petersburg
- Membership: 200
- Ideology: Liberalism; Abolitionism; Constitutionalism (early); Republicanism (later)
- Political position: Left-wing
- Movement: Decembrists

The Union of Prosperity (Russian: Союз благоденствия, romanized: Soyuz blagodenstviya) or Union of Welfare was a larger secret society of the Decembrists, established in early 1818 on the basis of the dissolved Union of Salvation and contained the literary society, the Green Lamp.

== Members ==
The members of the Union of Prosperity (UoP) included Alexander Nikolayevich Muravyov, Nikita Muravyov, Sergey Muravyov-Apostol, Matvei Muravyov-Apostol, Pavel Pestel, Ivan Yakushkin, Mikhail Lunin and others. Korennaya Uprava (Коренная управа, or Board) was the governing body of the UoP and the 6-member Soviet, or Duma (Совет, Дума) was the executive body of the society. The UoP was divided into upravas (управа, or regional branches), located in Saint Petersburg, Moscow, Tulchin, Kishinev and other cities. Most of the UoP members were nobles. Organizational structure and legal activities of the UoP were stated in the first part of its charter called the Green Book ("зелёная книга"). The second part of the charter, only to a small number of members, formulated the final purpose of the UoP, which was the abolishment of autocracy and serfdom and introduction of constitutional form of government. These goals were to be reached by relatively peaceful means. The UoP members strived to overcome the inner reserve and conspiratorial tactics of the Union of Salvation by attempting to exert influence on public opinion. A number of literary and pedagogical societies, Masonic lodges, and magazines sided with the UoP. In their works and speeches, the UoP members criticized serfdom, despotism, Arakcheyev's army reforms, lawlessness of tsarist court, authorities and censorship.

In 1820, the members of the Korennaya Uprava argued for the introduction of the republican system of government in Russia after Pavel Pestel's speech at their meeting in Petersburg. Simultaneously, there were people in the UoP who suggested a "military revolution" due to the increasing disagreements over UoP's program and tactical questions. In order to "drop" some unreliable and most radical members and to mislead the tsarist authorities, the Moscow meeting of the members of the Korennaya Uprava voted for the dissolution of the UoP in early 1821. Its most active members formed the basis for the establishment of the Northern and Southern Society of the Decembrists.

== See also ==
- Secret society

== Bibliography ==
- Yarmolinsky, Avrahm (2014) [1956]. Road to Revolution: A Century of Russian Radicalism. Princeton, New Jersey: Princeton University Press. ISBN 069161041X. OCLC 890439998.
