= Mykola Markevych =

Ukrainian historian

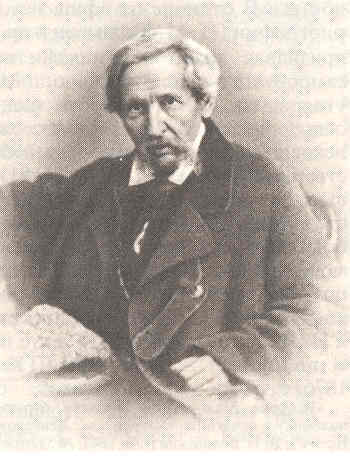
Mykola Markevych

Mykola Markevych (Ukrainian: Микола Андрійович Маркевич; 7 February 1804 – 21 June 1860) was a Ukrainian historian, ethnographer, musician and poet of Ukrainian Cossack descent, who was known as a friend of Alexander Pushkin, Wilhelm Küchelbecker, Anton Delvig and Kondraty Ryleyev. His main work is his five-volume History of Little Russia, which was published in Moscow between 1842 and 1843.

== Life ==
=== Background and early life ===
Mykola Markevych was of Ukrainian Cossack descent. He was born in Dunaiets, Chernigov Governorate, Russian Empire (now in modern-day Ukraine) on 7 February 1804. He studied at the Saint Petersburg Pedagogical Institute from 1817 to 1820, before studying piano and composition under John Field in Moscow.

=== Military and literary career ===
Markevych served as an officer in the Russian Imperial army from 1820 until 1824. He collected historical materials on Cossack history and Ukrainian folk songs at his estate and in central Ukraine. He wrote works on Ukrainian folklore, and foods from the region. He wrote on the Zaporozhian Cossacks, most notably on two Ukrainians, the military leaders Yakov Barabash and Martyn Pushkar. Markevych's works influenced the Russian novelist Nikolai Gogol, as well as two friends, the writer Alexander Pushkin and the poet Wilhelm Küchelbecker. His collections Elegies and Jewish Melodies and Erotic Poems and [a translation of Byron's poem] Parisina were published in Moscow in 1829, followed in 1831 by Ukrainian Melodies.

=== Death and legacy ===
Markevych died in Turivka, Poltava Governorate, Russian Empire on 21 June 1860. Many of his works remain unpublished. His personal archive and diary are kept at the Institute of Russian Literature in Saint Petersburg.
