= Urik (rural locality) =

Village in Irkutsk Oblast, Russia

Coordinates: 53°05′N 104°25′E

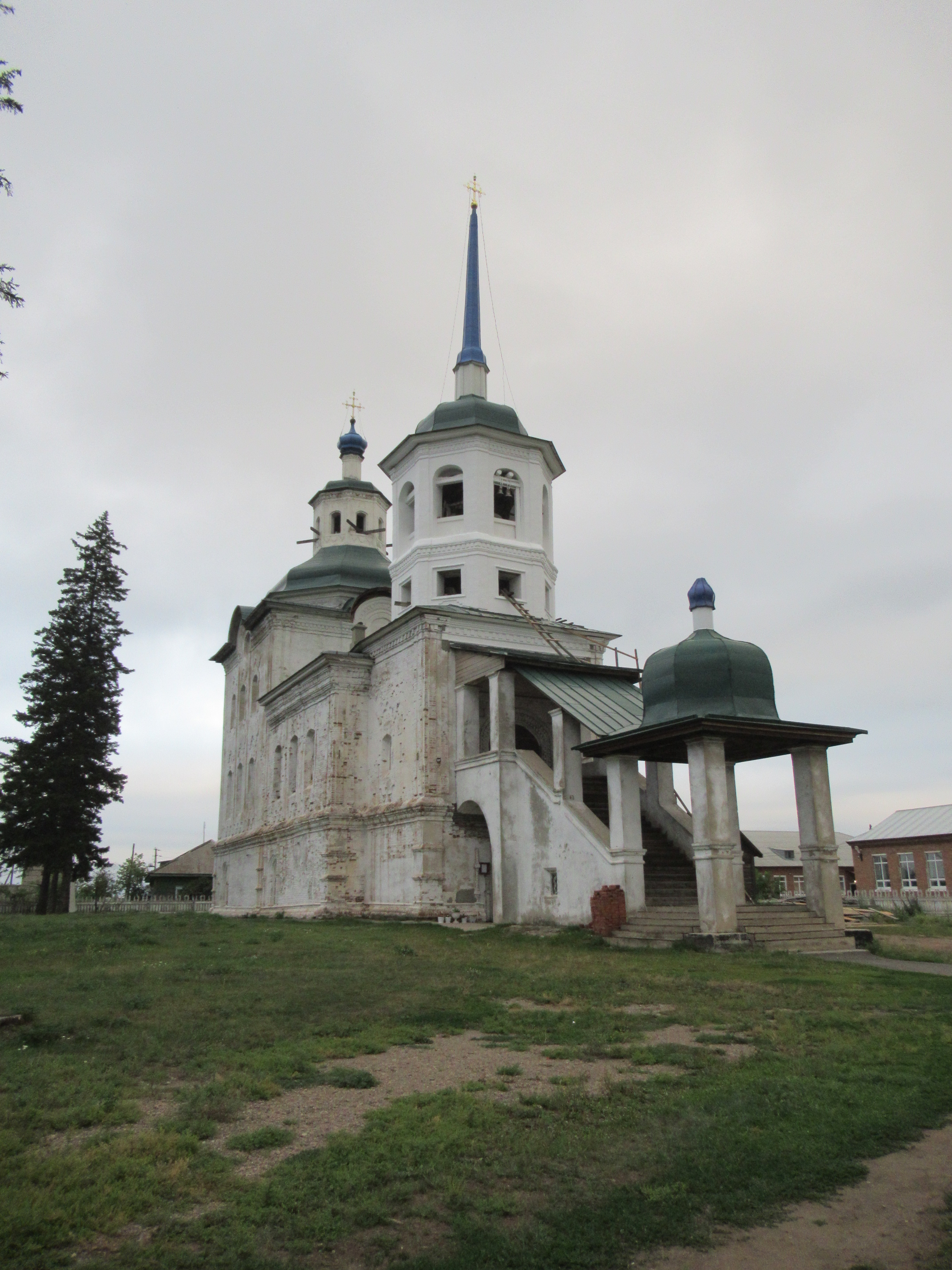
Church in Chenski Brothers Street, Urik, Irkutsk District, Irkutsk Region

Urik (Russian: Урик) is a rural locality (a selo) in Irkutsky District of Irkutsk Oblast, Russia, located approximately 18 kilometers (11 mi) north of Irkutsk. The population was 2,184 as of 2012.

It is named after the Urik River. Founded in 1673, it is the oldest rural locality in Irkutsky District. Several Decembrists, including Michael Lunin and Nikita Muravyov, were exiled to Urik.
