= Sankt-Peterburgsky Uyezd =

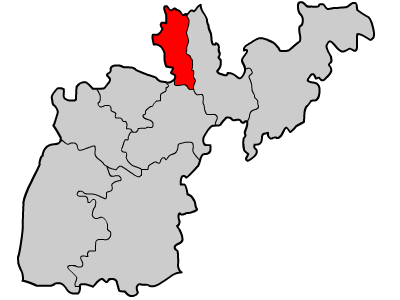
St.Petersburg Uezd on the map of Saint Petersburg governorate

Sankt-Peterburgsky Uyezd (Санкт-Петербургский уезд) was one of the subdivisions of the Saint Petersburg Governorate of the Russian Empire. It was situated in the northern part of the governorate. Its administrative centre was Saint Petersburg.

== Demographics ==
At the time of the Russian Empire Census of 1897, Sankt-Peterburgsky Uyezd had a population of 1,317,885. Of these, 85.4% spoke Russian, 4.0% German, 2.9% Finnish, 2.8% Polish, 1.0% Estonian, 0.9% Yiddish, 0.5% Latvian, 0.4% Ukrainian, 0.4% Tatar, 0.4% Swedish, 0.3% Lithuanian, 0.3% French, 0.2% Belarusian, 0.2% English, 0.1% Armenian and 0.1% Karelian as their native language.
