= Akatuy katorga =

Russian imperial prison in Transbaikalia

Coordinates: 51°2′N 117°47′E

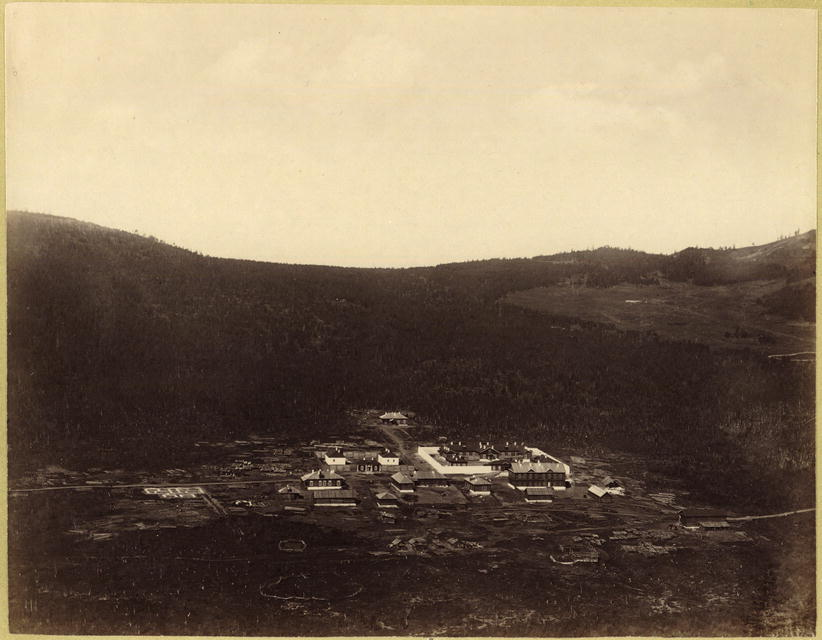
Akatuy prison, 1891

The Akatuy katorga prison (Russian: Акатуйская каторжная тюрьма, Akatuyskaya katorzhnaya tyur'ma), part of the Nerchinsk katorga system of the Russian Empire, operated in the present-day Alexandrovo-Zavodsky District of Transbaikalia in the Russian Far East. It originated in 1832 at the Akatuyskiy mine in the village of New Akatuy (Russian: Новый Акатуй). Originally labor convicts (mostly criminal) worked here extracting of lead-silver ores. After the closing of the Kara katorga in 1890, Akatuy became one of the main centers for the detention of political prisoners. It became a women's penal camp in 1911 and finally closed after the February Revolution of 1917.

George Kennan visited the remnants of the mine in 1885. He noted:

"Lunin, one of the Decembrist conspirators of 1825, lived and died in penal servitude at this mine, and somewhere in the neighborhood lie buried many of the Polish patriots sent to Akatui after the insurrection of 1863. The Russian Government does not take pains to perpetuate the memory of the political offenders whom it tortures to death in its Siberian prisons, and over moldering bodies of most of them there is not so much as a mound. If there is in Siberia a more lonely, a more cheerless, a more God-forsaken place than Kara, it is the snowy, secluded valley of Akatui."

== Notable inmates ==
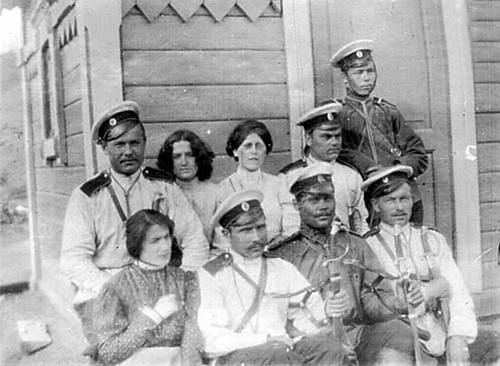
Shkolnik, Fialka, and Spiridonova with the konvoy on the way to Akatuy

- Yekaterina Bibergal
- Vasily Chashchin
- Grigory Gershuni
- Mikhail Gots
- Pyotr Karpovich, who assassinated Minister of National Enlightenment Nikolay Bogolepov
- Fanny Kaplan
- Pyotr Kulikovsky
- Viktor Kurnatovsky
- Alexey Kuznetsov (revolutionary)
- Michael Lunin
- Lev Mirsky
- Pavel Moshkin
- Ivan Okuntsov
- Prosh Proshian
- "The six" (the shesterka), a group of prominent female Socialist Revolutionary terrorists
  - Maria Spiridonova
  - Revekka Fialka
  - Aleksandra Izmailovich
  - Anastasia Bitsenko
  - Mariya Shkolnik
  - Lidiya Ezerskaya
- Mikhail Svidzinsky
- Vladimir Vilensky-Sibiryakov
- Pyotr Yakubovich
- Ivan Yudin
- Aaron Zundelevich
