= Kondraty Ryleyev =

Russian poet and Decembrist Revolt leader (1795–1826)

- Кондратий Рылеев
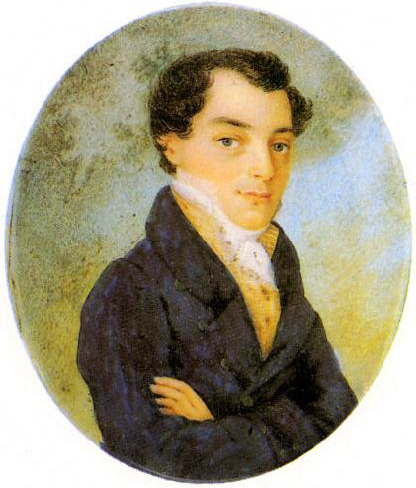
- Portrait by an unknown artist
- Born: Kondraty Fyodorovich Ryleyev; 29 September [O.S. 18 September] 1795; Batovo, Russian Empire
- Died: 25 July [O.S. 13 July] 1826 (aged 30); Saint Petersburg, Russian Empire
- Cause of death: Execution by hanging
- Occupations: Poet, publisher
- Known for: Decembrist revolt

Kondraty Fyodorovich Ryleyev (Russian: Кондра́тий Фёдорович Рыле́ев, Russian pronunciation: [kɐnˈdratʲɪj ˈfʲɵdərəvʲɪtɕ rɨˈlʲejɪf], 29 September [O.S. 18 September] 1795 – 25 July [O.S. 13 July] 1826) was a Russian poet, publisher, and a leader of the Decembrist revolt, which attempted to overthrow the Russian monarchy in 1825.

== Early life ==
Ryleyev was born in the village of Batovo, now part of Gatchinsky District, Leningrad Oblast. His father, Fyodor Ryleyev, was an impoverished nobleman, a small landowner, who was later employed as the manager of one of Prince Golitsyn's estates.

In spite of his family's pecuniary difficulties, Ryleyev was able to study at the Corps des Pages, an elite military academy attended only by members of the nobility, in Saint Petersburg. After his graduation, Ryleyev was awarded a commission in the First Cavalry Company of the First Reserve Artillery Brigade. He participated in the foreign campaigns of 1814 and 1815, seeing action in Poland, Germany and France, during the Napoleonic Wars.

In 1818, Ryleyev resigned his commission, and for a time was employed tutoring the children of a wealthy landowner named Tevyashev. A year later he married the landowner's daughter, Natalya Tevyasheva, and went on to father two children.

== Career ==
He gained recognition in literary circles in 1820, for penning a satirical ode To the Favorite, addressing an unpopular Tsarist official, Alexey Andreyevich Arakcheyev. That same year he joined a Masonic lodge in Saint Petersburg, where he became acquainted with several future members of the Decembrist uprising.

In need of a regular income, from 1821 to 1824, Ryleyev worked as an assessor of the Saint Petersburg criminal court. He frequently used his position to aid common men and women in distress. One of those he assisted was twenty-year-old Alexander Nikitenko, an educated Ukrainian serf, working in Saint Petersburg, whom Ryleyev met in a bookstore. Nikitenko had been struggling for some time to obtain emancipation. He explained his dilemma to Ryleyev, who immediately set about convincing several influential cavalry officers, old comrades of his, to campaign for Nikitenko's freedom. Nikitenko's case became something of a cause célèbre in Saint Petersburg, and the pressure ultimately proved to be too much for Nikitenko's owner, Count Sheremetev, to bear. He granted Nikitenko his freedom on October 11, 1824.

Ryleyev did not completely abandon his literary pursuits, however. In 1821, he joined the Free Society of Russian Literature Lovers (Volnoye obshchestvo lyubiteley rossiyskoy slovesnosti), an influential association of Russian writers and intellectuals. Ryleyev also edited and co-published a popular annual literary almanac, The Polar Star (Polyarnaya zvezda), with Alexander Alexandrovich Bestuzhev between 1823 and 1825. The three issues that Ryleyev published contained contributions from many of the foremost Russian authors and poets of the age, among them: Alexander Pushkin, Pyotr Vyazemsky, Vasily Zhukovsky, and Evgeny Baratynsky. He also continued to write poetry during this period. His most well-known poems being Grazhdanskoe muzhestvo (Civic Courage), Grazhdanin (The Citizen), and Ispoved' Nalivaiki (Nalivaiko's Confession). Ryleyev's writing was influenced largely by his compatriots Pushkin, Derzhavin, Gnedich, and the British poet Lord Byron, whose verse and account of the Greek War of Independence served to inspire many Russian intellectuals and artists of Ryleyev's generation. Ryleyev was a minor poet, but his poetry was passionate, and popular at the time it was published.

Ryleyev could not support his family with his literary work alone, and after leaving the criminal court, he found employment with the Russian-American Company as a manager in the Saint Petersburg office.

== Ryleyev the revolutionary ==
In 1823, Ryleyev was recruited by Ivan Pushchin to the revolutionary Northern Society, an organization of reform-minded individuals, mainly veterans of the Napoleonic Wars, dedicated to abolishing serfdom, and replacing the Tsar's government with either a democratic republic or a constitutional monarchy.

Ryleyev believed that the revolt was likely to fail and the participants would be executed. Still, he argued that their sacrifice would not be in vain, as the uprising might "awaken Russia." As Ryleyev explained prior to the uprising:

An upheaval is essential. The tactics of revolution may be summed up in two words—to dare. If we come to grief our failure will serve as a lesson to those who come after us.

Another Decembrist leader, Pavel Pestel, further elaborated on the motivations of the Society's members:

The desirability of granting freedom to the serfs was considered from the very beginning; for that purpose a majority of the nobility was to be invited in order to petition the Emperor about it. This was later thought of on many occasions, but we soon came to realize that the nobility could not be persuaded...we became even more convinced when the Ukrainian nobility absolutely rejected a similar project [proposed by] their military governor.

In his poem, Nalevaiko's Confession, Ryleyev makes veiled allusions to his own willingness to die for the Decembrists' cause:

Say not, thou holy man, again
That this is sin, thy words are vain,
Be it fearful mortal sin
Worse than all crimes that ever have been,
I care not - for could I but see
My native land at liberty,
Could I but see my race restored
To freedom from the foreign horde,
All sins would I upon me take...
Try not with threats my mind to shake,
Persuasive words no change can make...
I know full well the dire fate
Which must upon the patriot wait
Who first dare rise against the foe
And at the tyrant aim the blow.
This is my destined fate - but say
When, when has freedom won her way
Without the blood of martyrs shed,
When none for liberty have bled?
My coming doom I feel and know
And bless the stroke which lays me low
And, father, now with joy I meet
My death, to me such end is sweet.

In 1824, Ryleyev was appointed to the directorate of the Northern Society, and was destined to play a key role in the ill-fated uprising. He proved to be an inspirational speaker and talented recruiter. Fellow conspirator, Nikolay Bestuzhev, would later write of Ryleyev:

Physically his appearance was unattractive and he always spoke in a very simple way, but when he touched on his favourite theme—love of his country—his face lit up, his black glowing eyes shone with an unearthly light and his words flowed like a stream of lava.

During discussions among the Decembrists regarding what form of government should replace the monarchy, Ryleyev sided with Nikita Muravyev, favoring a government modeled after that of the United States. If the imperial family refused to go peacefully into exile, Ryleyev, like Pestel, was willing to support regicide in order to attain the goal of self-governance.

Ryleyev's friend, the Polish poet Adam Mickiewicz, later recounted one Decembrist meeting that he was invited to attend at Ryleyev's apartment in October 1824:

There must have been more than a dozen people in the room, but at first I could not distinguish anything because of the dense blue haze of pipe and cigar smoke. They were sprawling on sofas and on the deep windowsills; young Alexander Odoevsky and (Alexander) Bestuzhev sat cross-legged, Turkish fashion on a Persian carpet...

An intense youth, pale-complexioned, with a prominent forehead, a face like Shelley, lifts a glass - "Death to the Tsar." The toast is received with emotion. Ryleyev's jet-black eyes light up with an inner flame...Everyone drink's except me, a Pole and a guest...They sing to the death of the Tsar...the rhythmic chant flows through the open windows for all to hear. A glow of a lantern out on the quay suddenly lights up the room. The chant stops abruptly, as fear sobers them up. The shadow of Radishchev in the Fortress crosses my mind.

== Ryleyev and Ukraine ==
In the early 19th century, Ryleyev began working on a poetic novel entitled Nalyvaiko, inspired and based upon the leader of a late sixteenth-century Cossack uprising in Ukraine. His verses were said to have inspired generations of revolutionaries and academics including Ukrainian exile Mykhailo Drahomanov, who wrote that in the 1850s "The Confession of Nalyvaiko was copied in our secret notebook along with the works of Shevchenko and was read with equal zeal".

Upon his return to the Russian Empire, his unit was stationed first in Lithuania and then near Ostrogozhsk (Ostrohozk), a city founded by Ukrainian cossacks, where he spent almost three years. There he met his future wife, Natalia Teviashova, who was the daughter of a Cossack officer and came from a noble family.

Even after leaving the Russian Imperial Army at the end of 1818 and moving to Saint Petersburg he would regularly visit Ostrogozhsk and the vicinity, to which he always referred to as 'Ukraine'. In December 1825 he wrote to his friend Mykola Markevych: "I am a Russian, but I have spent three years in Ukraine: a short time for me, but sufficient to fall in love with that land and its fine inhabitants. Moreover, Ukraine has presented me with an uncommon, incomparable wife. My good Ukrainian lady has now been making me happy for six years, and so my attachment is complemented with the gratitude of my soul".

Even after moving to Saint Petersburg, Ryleyev did not forget his Ukrainian friends and connections from Ostrogozhsk and its surrounding vicinity. Ryleyev dedicated a poem written in the Summer of 1831 to an old acquaintance, Mikhail Bedraga who had nobly served in the Okhtyrka hussar regiment during the Napoleonic Wars. The poem described a discussion between Ryleyev and one of his friends in Ostrogozhsk surrounding the topic of the Zaporizhian Sich and the rebellion of the Greeks.

Ryleyev was highly inspired by the Ostrogozhsk Cossacks whose descendants he became acquainted with and whom he viewed as "champions of liberty inherited from their heroic past".

Ryleyev was known to have ransomed individuals out of serfdom; one of those rescued by Ryleyev wrote that his grandfather, the first to be indentured, was "taciturn, humble, and sensible when sober, once he had something to drink... was in the habit of holding forth on public affairs, recalling Cossackdom and the Hetman state; he was a harsh critic of the corruption of the rural administration”. The quote alludes to the possible enslavement of individuals for positive recollections of the Hetmenate and criticism of local administration.

In 1823, Ryleyev wrote a poem surrounding the famed meeting of Tsar Peter I and Hetman Ivan Mazepa at Ostrogozhsk in 1696. Ivan Mazepa famously led the Ukrainian Cossacks in revolt against Peter I and joined forces with King Charles XII of Sweden. Ryleyev did not avoid politically contentious topics or areas of history. In 1823 he began crafting yet another poetic novel surrounding Ivan Mazepa. This time the protagonist was his ambitious nephew Andrii Voinarovsky, who joined his uncle's uprising but on his way to the Ottoman Empire was imprisoned by Russian agents in the SS Peter and Paul Fortress and died in Yakutsk after being in exile for 16 years.

His work was criticized for depicting Ivan Mazepa in a favourable light and for allowing him to appear in some scenes of the work as a devoted and ever loyal patriot of his fatherland and willing to sacrifice his life for it. The poetic novel was published in 1924 after numerous omissions were made by the acute censor.

During the highly prolific years of 1821–1823, Ryleyev published a composition of numerous poems collectively titled Dumy (Meditations). Though the publication was said to have been inspired by Polish poet Julian Ursyn Niemcewicz and his work Historical Songs of 1816, Ryleyev was firm that Niemcwicz was not the primary source of his inspiration: "The duma is an ancient inheritance from our southern brethren. The Poles took it from us. To this day the Ukrainians sing dumy about their heroes – Doroshenko, Nechai, Sahaidachny, Palii – and the composition of one of them is attributed to Mazepa himself."

It is believed that around the year 1824, Ryleyev secured access to the Konysky History, "a fascinating source on the Cossack past". The brief excerpts that were available to him are said to have been the basis of his poem Nalyvaiko, this was rare information during that period.

== Decembrist revolt ==
On the morning of December 26 (December 14 O.S.), 1825, a group of officers commanding some 3,000 men assembled in Saint Petersburg's Senate Square. They refused to swear allegiance to the new tsar, Nicholas I, instead proclaiming their loyalty to his brother, Grand Duke Constantine, and to the Decembrists' constitution, crying "Constantine and Constitution." They expected to be joined by the rest of the troops stationed in Saint Petersburg, but this did not occur. The revolt was further hampered when its nominal leader, Prince Sergei Petrovich Trubetskoy, suffered a last-minute change of heart and chose to hide in the Austrian Embassy during the confrontation. His second-in-command, Colonel Bulatov, was also nowhere to be found. After a hurried consultation, the rebels appointed Prince Evgeny Obolensky as their leader.

Ryleyev was heard to remark:

What we foresaw will happen. Our last moments are near, but they are the moments of our liberty. We have lived them and now I willingly forfeit my life.

For several long hours there was a standoff between the 3,000 rebels and the 9,000 troops loyal to Nicholas I stationed outside the Senate building, with some desultory shooting from the rebel side. Nearby stood a vast crowd of civilian on-lookers, who began fraternizing with the rebels, but whom the leaders of the revolt did not call upon to participate in the action. Eventually, the new Tsar appeared in person, at the square. He sent Count Mikhail Miloradovich, a hero of the Napoleonic Wars, who enjoyed great popularity with both officers and ordinary soldiers, to parley with the rebels. While delivering a speech encouraging the rebels to surrender, Miloradovich was shot dead by one of the rebels, Peter Kakhovsky. At the same time, a rebelling grenadier squad led by Lieutenant Nikolay Panov, entered the Winter Palace, but failed to seize it and retreated.

After spending most of the day in fruitless attempts to parley with the rebel force, the Tsar ordered a cavalry charge. However, the horses slipped on the icy cobbles and the officers retired in disorder. Eventually, as evening neared, the Tsar ordered three artillery regiments to open fire, with devastating effect. To avoid the slaughter the rebels broke and ran. Some attempted to regroup on the frozen surface of the Neva River, to the north of Senate Square. However, here, also, they were targeted by the artillery and suffered many casualties. The cannon fire broke the ice, sweeping away countless dead and dying soldiers into the Neva River. By dusk, that same afternoon, the revolt had been crushed.

== Arrest and execution ==
On the night of December 27 (December 15 O.S.), 1825, Ryleyev was arrested for his role in the uprising, and charged with treason and attempted regicide. Along with four other Decembrists, judged to be the leaders of the rebellion, Ryleyev was sentenced to be drawn and quartered. The method of execution was changed to hanging after the Tsar refused to confirm the verdict, returning it for further deliberation.

During the many interrogations that followed his arrest, Ryleyev, unlike most of his fellow conspirators, never implicated anyone else in the rebellion. Ryleyev then went one step further, pleading with the Investigation Committee in April 1826, to execute him alone for the revolt, stating:

If an execution is needed for the good of Russia, I am the only one who deserves it. I have long prayed that it will stop at me, and that the others will be returned by God's mercy to their families, their fatherland, and their noble Tsar.

The date of execution was set for July 25 (July 13 O.S.), 1826. When the executioner attempted to hang the five men, three of them, Muravyov-Apostol, Kakhovsky, and Ryleyev, dropped through the trapdoor only to have the rope around their necks break. Ryleyev supposedly told the crowd watching the execution that Russia was an "unhappy country, where they don't even know how to hang you." Muravyov-Apostol is said to have made a similar exclamation. However, the most recent hanging in Russia before the Decembrists took place nearly 50 years earlier, so there was no more or less experienced hangman available. The Tsar simply ordered more rope, and the execution was carried out not long after the first attempt. Ryleyev died holding a book of Byron's poetry.

== In popular culture ==
Vladimir Nabokov discusses Ryleyev's legacy in Batavo, which his maternal great grandmother owned, in Speak, Memory. In Batavo, Nabokov writes, Ryleyev was referred to as "the hanged one," and a path was called the favorite walk of the hanged one.

== See also ==
- List of famous duels
