= Nikita Muravyov =

Russian military leader (1795–1843)

Nikita Mikhailovich Muravyov
- Никита Михайлович Муравьёв
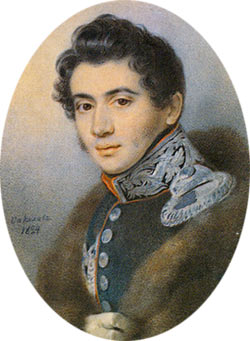
- Portrait of Muravyov, by Pyotr Sokolov (1824) clutching a fur stole.
- Born: July 30 [O.S. July 19] 1796; Saint Petersburg, Russian Empire
- Died: May 10 [O.S. April 28] 1843 (aged 47); Urikovskaia, now Urik, Irkutsk Raion, Irkutsk Oblast
- Education: Moscow University
- Occupation: officer
- Organization: Union of Salvation
- Movement: Decembrist
- Relatives: cousins: Sergey Ivanovich Muravyov-Apostol; Ippolit Muravyov-Apostol; Artamon Muravyov; Alexander Muravyov
- Military career
- Allegiance: Russian Empire
- Branch: Imperial Russian Guard
- Service years: 1813-1825
- Rank: Captain
- Unit: Guards general staff
- Conflicts: Battle of Leipzig; Battle of Dresden

Nikita Mikhailovich Muravyov (Russian: Ники́та Миха́йлович Муравьёв; July 30 [O.S. July 19] 1796 – May 10 [O.S. April 28] 1843) was an Imperial Guards staff officer and plotter in what led to the Decembrist revolt of 1825.

Muravyov was active in a number of proto-Decembrist organizations. In 1816, he was among the founders of the Union of Salvation, a secret society. In 1820, he spoke out for republican government in the Union of Welfare. After the Union of Welfare's 1821 dissolution, Muravyov joined the supreme duma and was a leader in the Northern Society, and was elected to the Southern Society's directory. He wrote a draft constitution for a Russian state, and a tract "Curious Conversation" arguing the need to rise against despotism.

He was on leave in the country when the Decembrist revolt occurred on 14 December 1825, and did not participate directly in it. But he was complicit, arrested and imprisoned in the Peter and Paul Fortress. He was condemned to death, but the sentence was commuted to 20 years of hard labor. He was assigned to the Nerchinsk Mines, then in 1835 exiled to Irkutsk Province where he died in 1843.
