= Alexander Bestuzhev =

Russian writer and Decembrist

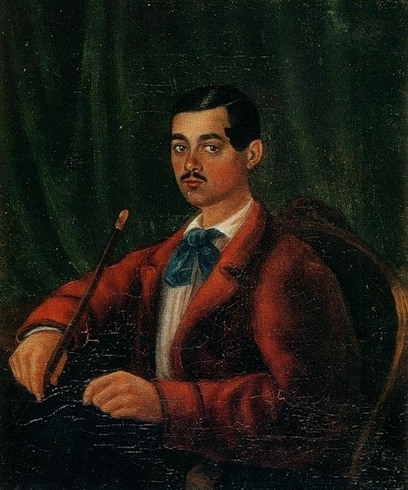
- Portrait by unknown artist
- Born: 3 November 1797; St. Petersburg, Russian Empire
- Died: 19 June 1837 (aged 39); Sochi, Russian Empire
- Writing career
- Movement: Romanticism

Alexander Alexandrovich Bestuzhev (Russian: Алекса́ндр Алекса́ндрович Бесту́жев, IPA: [bʲɪˈstuʐɨf]; 3 November [O.S. 23 October] 1797 – 19 June [O.S. 7 June] 1837) was a Russian writer and Decembrist. After the Decembrist revolt he was sent into exile to the Caucasus where the Russian Empire was waging war against the Circassians. There writing under the pseudonym Marlinsky (Russian: Марли́нский, IPA: [mɐrˈlʲinskʲɪj]) he became known as a romantic poet, short story writer and novelist. He was killed there in a skirmish.

== Early life and education ==
Alexander Bestuzhev came from the rich and noble Bestuzhev family. He received an excellent education. From a very young age his father prepared him for military service. Since he was not keen on mathematics, he failed to enter the navy and began to serve as a dragoon in the Guard.

== Career ==
In 1818 he was promoted to officer, he also served as aide-de-camp to several senior officers and he could make a successful career. However, he joined the Decembrists.

=== Arrest and trial ===
Arguably he was not as radical as most of the conspirators and joined the plot not because he wanted to establish a republic in Russia but simply because many Decembrists were his friends; four of his brothers were also in the plot. Due to this fact and due to his confessions during the trial, he spent only a year and a half in prison and thereafter was sent into exile in Yakutia.

=== Release ===
Bestuzhev wanted to return to society and in order to obtain forgiveness he asked the authorities for transference to the army in Caucasus as a private. In 1829 he started serving in the 14th Chasseurs regiment. Though authorities were reluctant to promote degraded officers, Bestuzhev proved himself an outstandingly brave soldier and was finally promoted to officer in 1836.

== Death ==
On 19 June 1837 he was killed in a skirmish with Circassians. Two of his brothers, Mikhail and Nikolay were sentenced to life at Katorga for their part in the Decembrist plot in 1826.

== Literary heritage ==
Bestuzhev started publishing his poetry and short prose in 1819 and soon received attention. He became acquainted with Alexander Pushkin, Aleksander Griboyedov, Kondraty Ryleyev and many others. Before the Decembrist revolt, Bestuzhev was quite a prolific author, writing both prose (short stories and articles in literary magazines) and poetry. In 1823 and 1824 together with Ryleyev he edited famous literary almanac Polar Star (Russian: Полярная Звезда), which featured almost all notable contemporary Russian poets and was a huge success. His ceased writing during the trial and exile in Siberia, but soon resumed publishing under the pseudonym Marlinsky. Due to his pseudonym Bestuzhev is commonly referred to as Bestuzhev (Marlinsky) in order to distinguish him from another Decembrist Bestuzhev, who was executed.

The most notable part of his heritage are fictional or loosely autobiographical stories that describe the Caucasus war, from which Alexandre Dumas's Sultanetta was taken, and could have influenced Lermontov's A Hero of Our Time. The works of Bestuzhev may be classified as the florid Romanticism in the vein of Lord Byron, Hugo or Walter Scott. His characters are often excessively extravagant, sometimes he deliberately chose medieval jousts as a background for his prose. In 1830s Bestuzhev (Marlinsky) was one of the most popular writers in Russia whose fame could be compared with that of Pushkin. The first edition of Bestuzhev's complete works was published in 1839.

== English translations ==
- An Evening on Bivouac, and The Test, (short stories), from Russian Romantic Prose: An Anthology, Translation Press, 1979. ISBN 978-1-46-830151-9

== See also ==
- Alexander Bestuzhev House
