= Nerchinsk katorga =

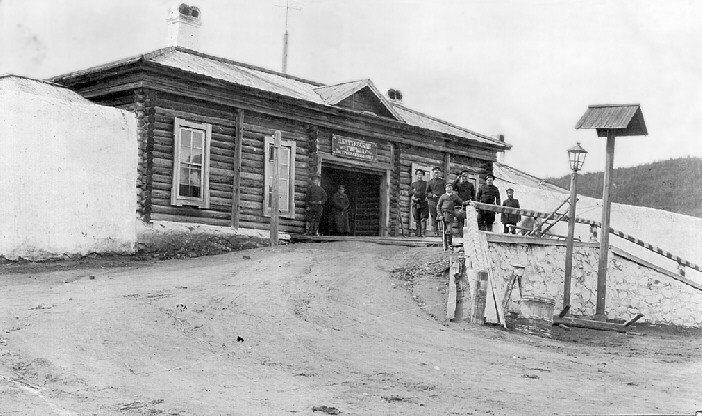
Akatuy katorga (Акатуйская каторжная тюрьма, 1832–1917)

Nerchinsk katorga (Russian: Нерчинская каторга, romanized: Nerchinskaya katorga) was a system of katorga—a type of penal labour—practiced by the Russian Empire in the area of the Nerchinsk Mining District. That district embraced a large part of eastern Transbaikalia (today's Chita Oblast), near the China–Russia border, in the 18th to 20th centuries. The District consisted of a variable number of industrial centres (zavody), usually operated by military administrations, the first of which, Nerchinsk, situated not far from the confluence of Nercha and Shilka Rivers, was established in the 18th century after the discovery in the area of large mineral reserves. Thus, penal labor was used to work the mines.

The village of Nerchinsky Zavod, another of the District centres, was founded in 1700 by Greek mining engineers in the employ of the Russian Government. Several shafts and smelting furnaces were constructed. Starting in 1722, prisoners took over the mining.

Katorga labor was used for mining lead ore and silver on tsar's private lands (so called cabinet lands) and in foundries, wine-making and salt-processing factories. From 1850 to 1890, katorga labor was used at Kara gold fields and for the construction of prison buildings. In 1869, they established the Nerchinsk Katorga Administration, which subordinated to the Ministry of the Interior. From 1826 to 1917, it was a katorga for political prisoners.

Its prisons were named after the mines they served:

- Akatuy katorga (Акатуйская каторжная тюрьма, 1832–1917)
- Algachi katorga prison (Алгачинская каторжная тюрьма, 1869–1915)
- Kara katorga (Карийская каторга)
  - Upper-Kara prison (closed in 1890)
  - Middle-Kara prison (closed in 1890)
  - Lower-Kara or Ust-Kara prison
- Zerentuy katorga (Зерентуйская каторжная тюрьма)
  - Maltsev katorga (for women) (Мальцевская каторжная тюрьма)
  - Kutomarskaya katorga (Кутомарская каторжная тюрьма)
  - Kadainskaya katorga (Кадаинская каторжная тюрьма)
- Alexandrovskaya prison (Александровская тюрьма)

Among its convicts were Decembrists, insurgents of Polish uprising of 1830–31, Polish uprising of 1863, Narodniks, Social Democrats, and others.

During George Kennan's visit to the area in 1885, together with the painter George Albert Frost, he noted the Algachi and Pokrofski mines were worked by about 220 convicts. These two mines were the most productive in the district, producing 1440 pounds of silver and 144,000 pounds of lead, from 400 short tons of ore. The total number of convicts in the Nerchinsk silver-mining district was approximately 952. There were 188 at Alexandrofski Zavod, 150 at Algachi, 70 at Pokrofski. The Kadainski and Smirnovo mines had 184. The Savenski and Gorni Zerentuiefski mines had 360.

== 1885 George Kennan Gallery ==
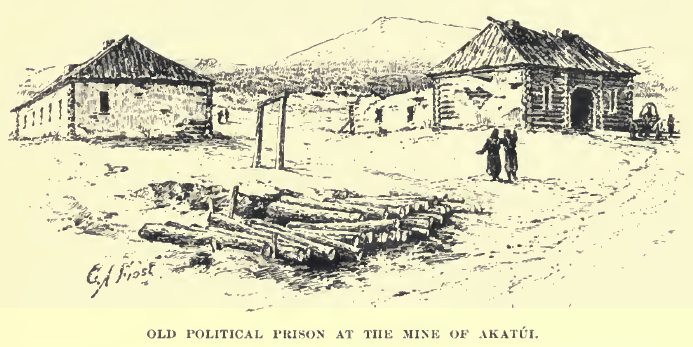
Akatui

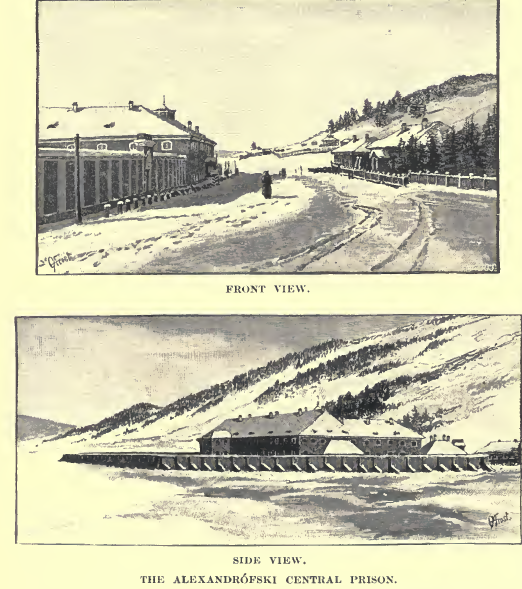
Alexandrovsk Prison

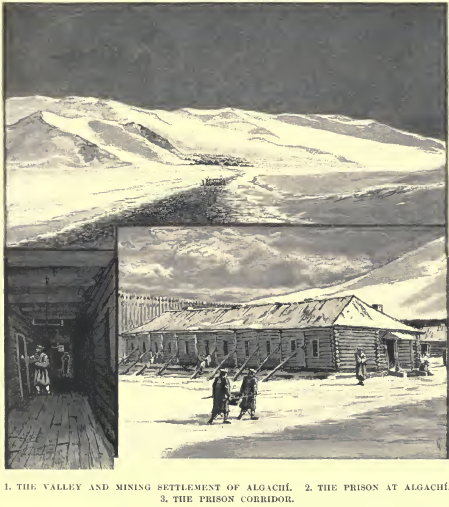
Algachi

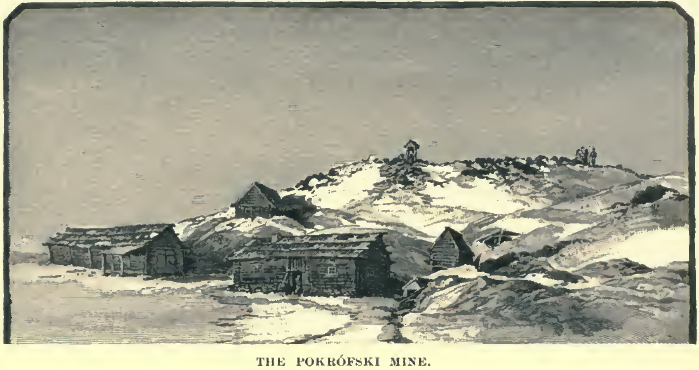
Pokrofski Mine

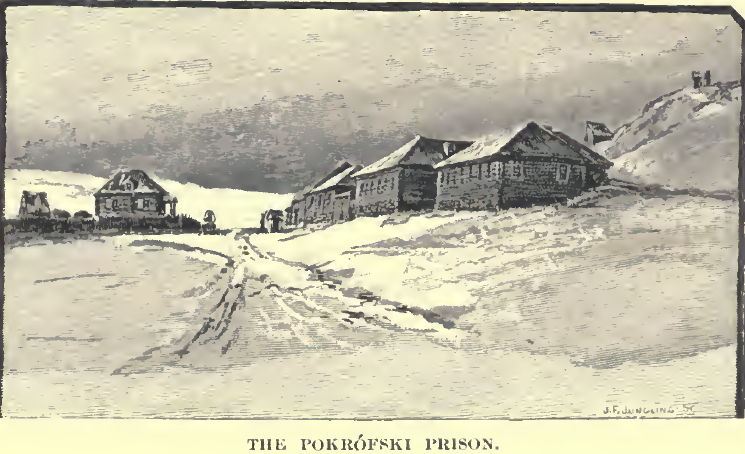
Pokrofski Prison

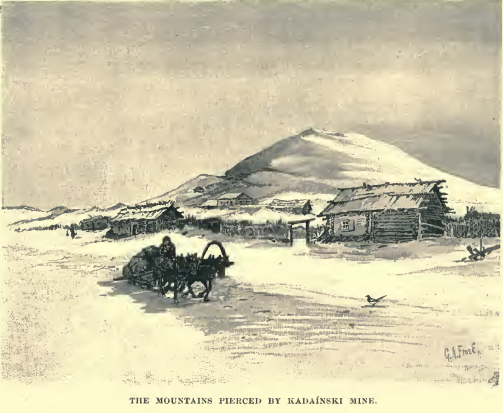
Kadainski

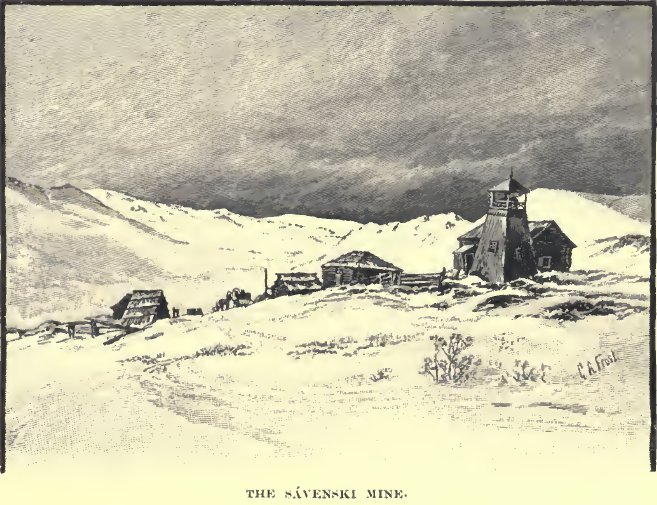
Savenski
