= Pavel Pestel =

Russian revolutionary

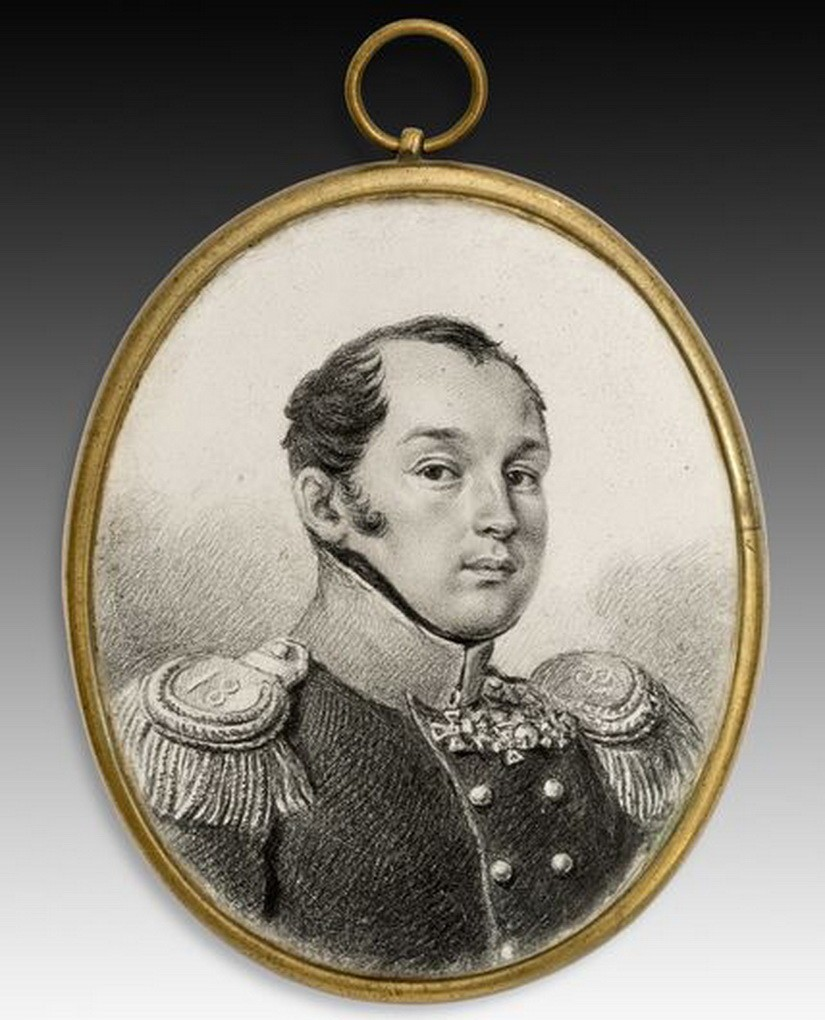
Pavel Pestel

Colonel Pavel Ivanovich Pestel (Russian: Павел Иванович Пестель; 5 July [O.S. 24 June] 1793 – 25 July [O.S. 13 July] 1826) was a Russian revolutionary and ideologue of the Decembrists.

== Early life ==
Pavel Pestel was born in Moscow on 5 July [O.S. 24 June] 1793. He came from a Lutheran family of Saxon descent that had settled in Russia during the reign of Peter the Great. His great-grandfather, grandfather, father and uncle had all successively served as director of Moscow's postal mail service, forming a dynasty of sorts. His father Ivan (1765–1843) continued to work his way up through the political bureaucracy to become Governor-General of Siberia from 1806 to 1821. Ivan Pestel, together with his associate Nikolai Treskin, the governor of Irkutsk, established a corrupt regime in Siberia and was eventually dismissed.

In 1805–1809, Pavel Pestel studied in Dresden. In 1810–1811, he was a student at the Page Corps, from which he would graduate in the rank of praporshchik. Pestel was then sent to the Lithuanian Regiment of the Leib Guard. He took part in the Patriotic War of 1812 and foreign military campaigns of 1813-1814. He was seriously wounded while fighting at Borodino, and for his actions personally received the Gold Sword for Bravery from Field Marshal Kutuzov. Pestel continued to distinguish himself during the following campaign at the battles of Dresden, Kulm, and Leipzig as an adjutant to Peter Wittgenstein. After serving in a number of cavalry regiments, he was in 1821 appointed commander of the Vyatka Infantry Regiment quartered in Tulchin, where the enlightened general Pavel Kiselyov welcomed liberal-minded officers.

== Decembrist ==
In 1816 Pestel became a member of the Union of Salvation and one of the authors of its charter. He managed to make all the society members agree on the republican program of the Union, thereby laying the foundations for the republican traditions in the Russian emancipation movement. At the same time, Pavel Pestel spoke in support of mass repressions, regicide and physical annihilation of all the members of the imperial family initially. In 1818 Pestel joined a more liberal secret society called the Union of Prosperity without regicide plans. In March 1821 he established and became the leader of the Southern Society of the Decembrists. Pestel advocated merging the Northern Society of the Decembrists with the former and travelled to Saint Petersburg in 1824 to try to make that happen.

Starting in 1821, Pavel Pestel worked on a project of social and economic reforms in Russia, which he would later call Russkaya Pravda (Русская правда) and which would be adopted as a political program. The second edition of the Russkaya Pravda manifested further democratization of Pestel's views. It demanded immediate emancipation of the Russian serfs with their land, limitations of the right to landownership, creation of public and private land-funds, elimination of class privileges, and the granting of political rights to males over 20 years of age.

Pestel was a staunch advocate of a republic and of state centralization. According to his summary of the Russkaya Pravda called "Constitution. State precept" (Конституция. Государственный завет), a one-chamber People's Veche (Народное вече) would become Russia's legislative body. A Sovereign Duma (Державная дума) was pronounced the executive branch. A Supreme Sobor (Верховный собор) was given judicial powers. In 1825 Pavel Pestel conducted negotiations with the Polish Patriotic Society, discussing the possibility of joint revolutionary actions.

On 13 December 1825 (the day before the Decembrists came out in open revolt in Saint Petersburg) Pavel Pestel was arrested in Tulchin (in Podolia) in relation to an attempt to assassinate Emperor Nicholas I. He gave evidence against many Decembrists "to save their names for history" and they were detained because of him. But he did not know the real history of the Decembrist societies. For example, there is an opinion now, that just the Order of Russian Knights, linked to Alexander von Benckendorff, was the main secret organization and not Pestel's Salvation Union. His and Bestuzhev-Ryumin's evidence had the effect of encouraging the members of the Trial Committee (some of them relatives of Decembrists or even the members of secret societies) to hang Pestel and Bestuzhev-Ryumin to stop their evidence. He was hanged with four other Decembrists in the Peter and Paul Fortress a few months later.
