= Aleksandr Min =

Soviet Red Army captain (1915–1944)

Aleksandr Pavlovich Min
- Александр Павлович Мин
- Born: December 1915; Chersan-Don village, Primorskaya Oblast, Russian Empire
- Died: 9 July 1944 (aged 28); Pariduby village, Stara Vyzhivka Raion, Volyn Oblast, Ukrainian SSR, USSR
- Military career
- Allegiance: Soviet Union
- Branch: Red Army
- Service years: 1941–1944
- Rank: Captain
- Unit: 605th Rifle Regiment
- Conflicts: World War II †
- Awards: Hero of the Soviet Union

Aleksandr Pavlovich Min (Russian: Александр Павлович Мин; 1915 – 9 July 1944) was an officer in the Red Army and the first Korean awarded the title Hero of the Soviet Union.

== Early life ==
Min was born in December 1915 to a Korean peasant family in Chersan-Don. After completing his tenth grade of secondary school in 1932 he went on to attend the Far Eastern Federal University in Vladivostok, which he studied at from 1933 to 1937 before becoming a Russian language teacher on Putyatin Island. That very year, he and his family were deported to Kazakhstan by the Soviet government because they were Korean. As a "special settler", he had few civil rights compared to other Soviet citizens. In exile he worked as an accountant and attended the Saratov Economic Institute. He was drafted into the Red Army in May 1941, shortly before the German invasion of the Soviet Union.

== World War II ==
After graduating from the Ryazan Infantry School, Min was assigned to a construction battalion with the rank of private; there he participated in the Battle of Moscow. In fall 1942 he became a junior lieutenant, and was assigned to the 1st battalion of the 605th Rifle Regiment as an adjutant. In the fall of 1942, he graduated from the courses for junior lieutenants at the 13th Army of the Bryansk Front. He served as adjutant of the 1st Rifle Battalion of the 605th Rifle Regiment of the 132nd Rifle Division.

His actions during the battle of Kursk were noticed by senior officers, who praised him for his bravery in repelling four German counterattacks on 5 July 1943. For doing so he was awarded the Order of the Red Star, the first of his many military awards. In January 1944, Min was appointed battalion commander of the 605th Infantry Regiment of the 132nd Infantry Division of the 65th Army of the 1st Belorussian Front, and that year he was accepted into the Communist Party as well as promoted to captain. He distinguished himself in the battles for the Volyn region. Min again distinguished himself for bravery after he repelled five counterattacks, enabling the successful take over the Ukrainian village of Stary Koshary in Kovel on 4–5 July 1944. However, he was killed in action just a few days later while breaking through a heavily fortified area in Pariduby. He was posthumously declared a Hero of the Soviet Union on 24 March 1945, making him the first Korean awarded the title.

He is buried in a mass grave at the village of Lukiv in Turiisk Raion, Volyn Oblast.

== Awards and honours ==
- Hero of the Soviet Union (24 March 1945)
- Order of Lenin (24 March 1945)
- Order of Aleksandr Nevsky (9 February 1944)
- Order of the Patriotic War 1st class (26 July 1944)
- Order of the Patriotic War 2nd class (20 September 1943)
- Order of the Red Star (25 July 1943)

A bust of Min was installed near the building of a secondary school in the village of Buryl in Zhambyl region of Kazakhstan. His name is also carved in the list of fellow countrymen from Puyatin, Fokino in Primorsky Krai, who gave up their lives during World War II. On September 5, 2007, a memorial plaque in honor of Min was installed on the building of secondary school No#254 in Putyatin Island. The school also collects materials and conducts lessons on Min.

In Uzbekistan, streets in Tashkent and Akkurgan are also named after Min.
