= Alexey Startsev =

Russian merchant and industrialist (1838–1900)

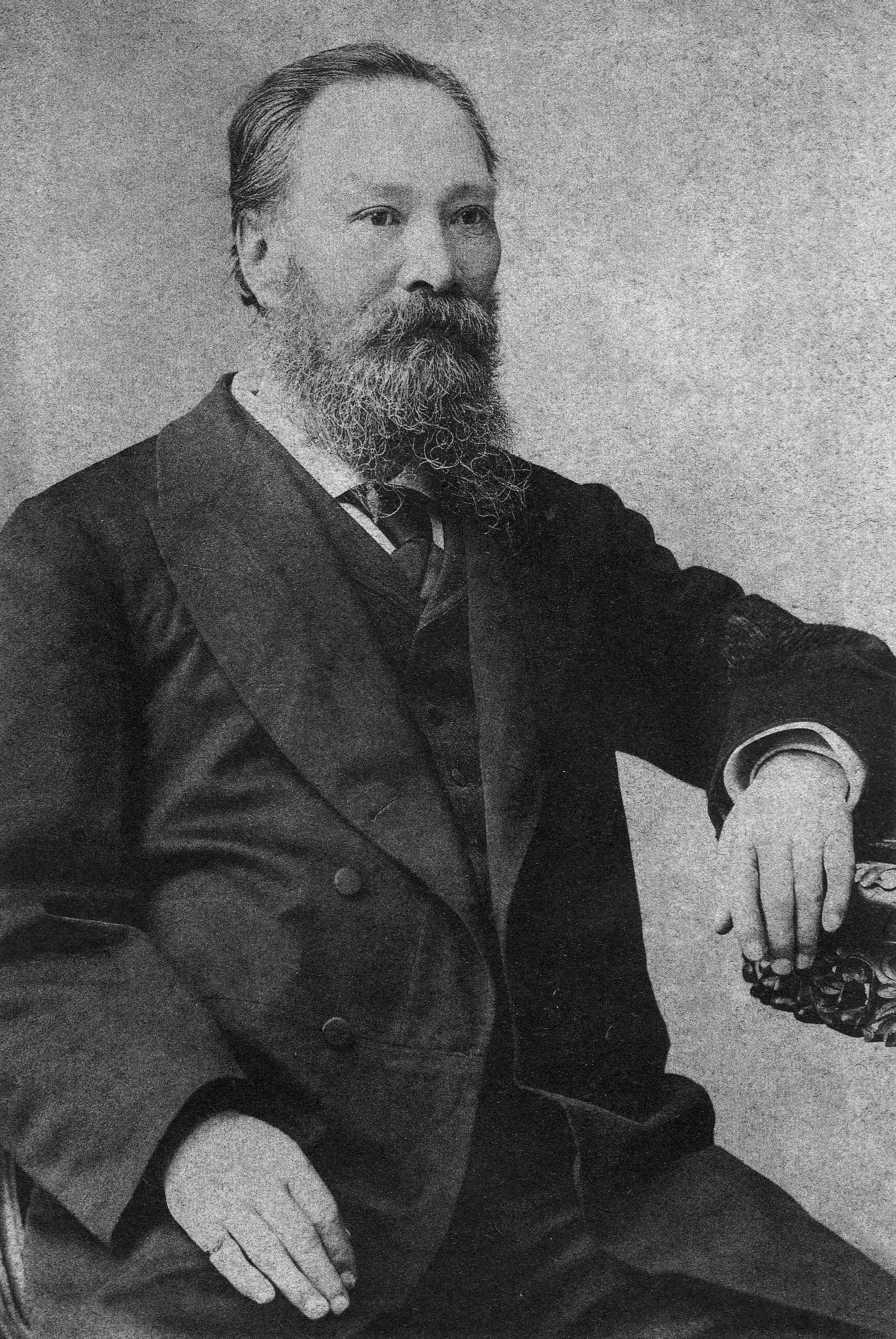
Alexey Startsev (1880s)

Alexey Dmitriyevich Startsev (Russian: Алексей Дмитриевич Старцев; (1838, Novoselenginsk – 30 June 1900, Putyatin Island) was a Russian merchant and industrialist.

== Biography ==
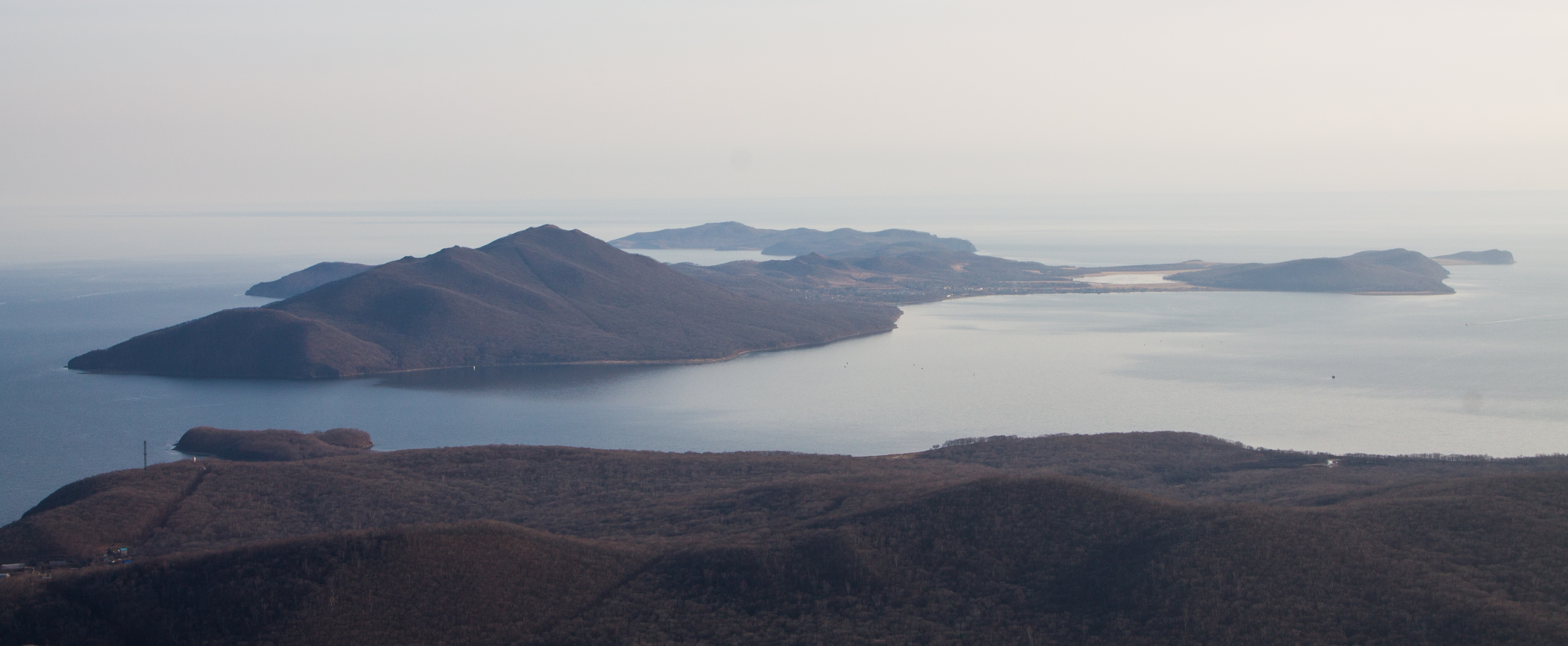
Putyatin Island (2014)

Startsev was a common-law child of the painter Nikolay Bestuzhev and a Buryat woman from Petrovsk-Zabaykalsky. After his father's death in 1855, he went to live with his godfather, Dmitry Dmitriyevich Startsev, a local merchant. At first, he worked as a clerk for Startsev, then for Alexey Lushnikov, a guild merchant in Kyakhta. In 1861, he joined a trade caravan to China. There, he became involved in the tea trade, which made him wealthy. By the time of his death, he was a millionaire. He built forty stone houses and a printing plant in Tianjin, as well as a two-mile long demonstration railway and telegraph lines. He also helped establish the Russo-Chinese Bank, and served as one of its board members. In addition. he spoke Buryat, Mongolian, Chinese, and several European languages, often serving as an interpreter; notably in the negotiations with Li Hongzhang, which led to the Tianjin Convention. He also served on the French "Tianjin Municipal Council". For his role in organizing and conducting Sino-French trade negotiations, he was awarded the Legion of Honor, 5th degree.

Around 1890, he moved to the Siberian far east. In 1891, he received permission to purchase 1000 dessiatins (about 2700 acres) on Putyatin Island in Peter the Great Gulf. The remainder of the island would be leased. He used the land to create the settlement of Putyatin. In 1892, he bought a steamer named Чайка (Seagull), which operated as a passenger and freight line between there and Vladivostok. By 1895, he had opened brick and porcelain factories, established herds of cattle and sika deer, was operating a stud farm, and built a four-story house for himself in the center of Vladivostok. His former home in Kyakhta was donated to the city and, through contributions by the Imperial Russian Geographical Society, became the Kyakhta Museum of Local Lore. After its opening, he was elected an honorary member of the Society.

About the time of his death, his large collection of Buddhist objects, manuscripts, and books on East Asian studies, still in Tianjin, was destroyed during the Boxer Rebellion. Only two years earlier, the Louvre had offered him 3 million Francs for his Burkhan sculptures, but he had refused to sell. He died and was buried on Putyatin. A mountain there is named after him, and a monument was erected at his burial site in 1989.

He had three sons and two daughters. Following the October Revolution, his businesses were all nationalized. His sons Dmitry and Alexander, who had been operating them, were deprived of their civil rights and expelled from Vladivostok. In 1937, during the Great Purge, they were arrested and shot.

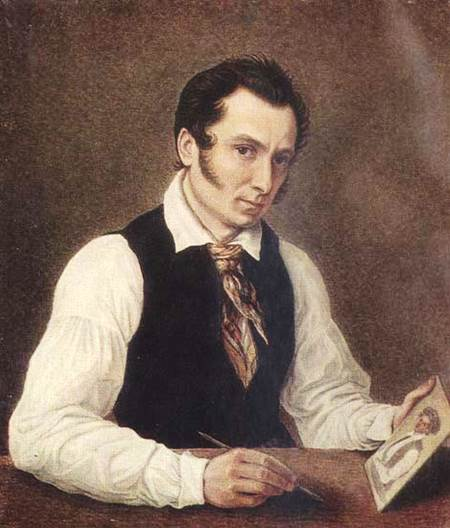
His father, Nikolay Bestuzhev (self-portrait, 1838)
