= Putyatin =

Putyatin may refer to:

- Putyatin (family), a princely family of Rurikid stock
- Viktor Putyatin (1941–2021), Soviet fencer
- Yevfimy Putyatin (1803–1883), Russian admiral
- Putyatin (urban-type settlement), an urban-type settlement in Primorsky Krai, Russia
- Putyatin Island
