= Tobolsk Mariinsky Women's School =

Defunct Institute for Noble Maidens

- Тобольская Мариинская женская школа
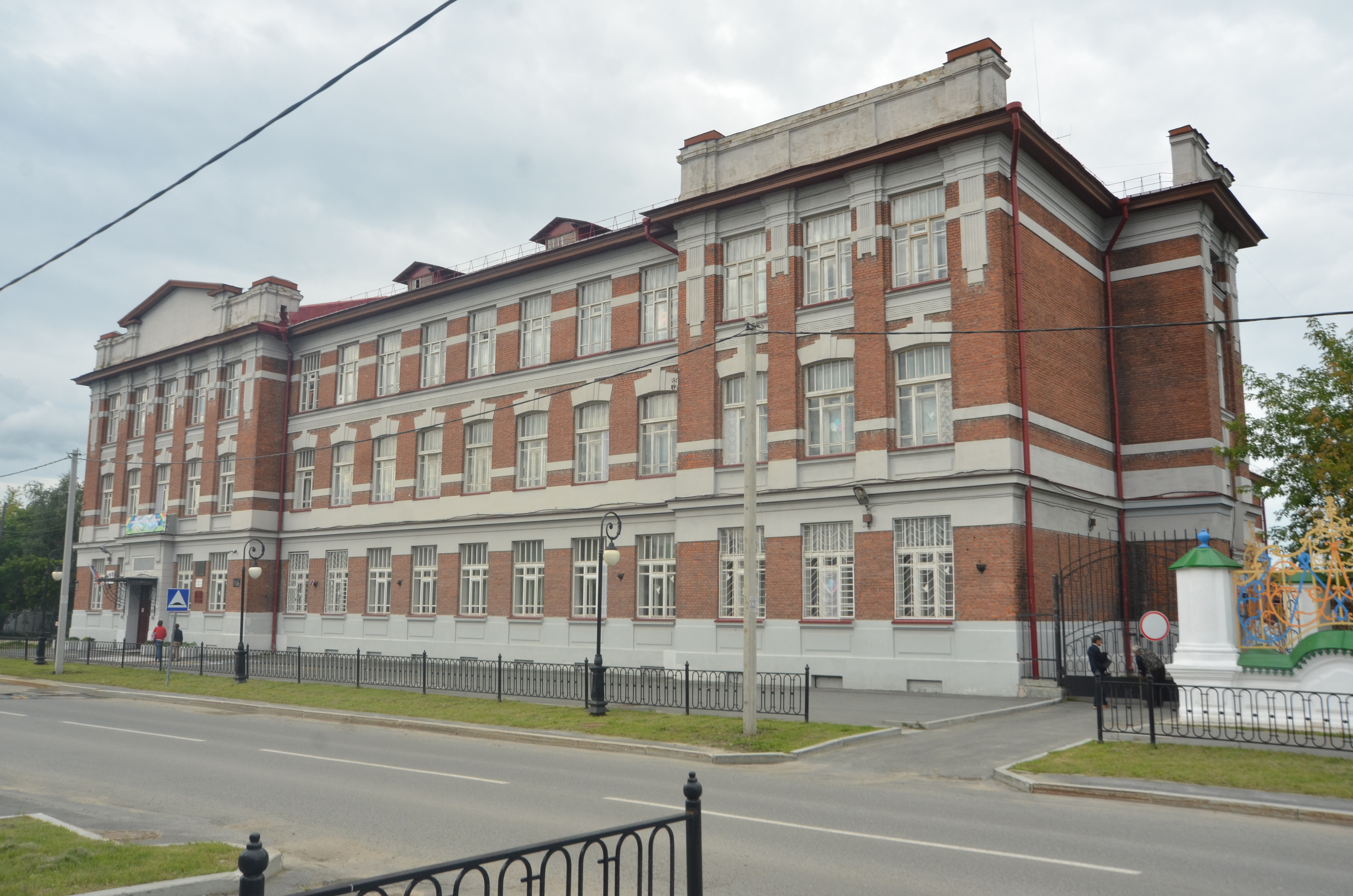
- Established: 1854
- Location: Tobolsk, Russia
- Language: Russian

The Tobolsk Mariinsky Women's School (Russian: Тобольская Мариинская женская школа) is a closed women's educational institution (Institute for Noble Maidens) of the Russian Empire, part of the department of institutions of Empress Maria, which existed from 1854 to 1919 in Tobolsk.

== History ==
On 9 June 1851, a member of the State Council Nicholas Annenkov, who carried out an audit of Western Siberia, turned to the Tobolsk governor K. F. Engelka with an order to draw up a Draft Regulations for a women's educational institution and raise funds for its maintenance. On 4 March 1852, under the chairmanship of the new Tobolsk governor T.F. Prokofiev, a Committee was established on the organization of a girls' school in the city of Tobolsk. The members of the Committee included officials of the administration of the Tobolsk governor, deputies from the merchants and bourgeoisie K. N. Nikolaev and A. M. Muravyov, a former Decembrist, at that time an official of the office of the Tobolsk general provincial government. Other Decembrists who were in exile in Tobolsk also contributed to the opening of the school: Mikhail Fonvizin and P.N. Svistunov, who contributed funds to create the school.

On 30 August 1852, the Tobolsk Women's School was opened in Tobolsk to train girls of all classes. The total number of students that year was one hundred, and the next year and the following years the number of students was one hundred and twenty. On 22 July 1854, by decree of Emperor Alexander II, the school was renamed the Tobolsk Mariinsky Women's School and became part of the department of institutions of Empress Maria and began to enjoy the rights of institutions of this department. The structure of the school consisted of two departments: the First, for the education of girls from the lower classes, in the amount of one hundred and twenty students, and the Second, for the education of the daughters of the noble class, merchants and the clergy, consisting of fifty students. The departments were divided into two classes: lower and higher, with three years of study in each of the classes. Girls were admitted to the first department from ten to twelve years old, to the second department: lower class - from ten to twelve years old, upper class - up to thirteen years old. The general work of the Mariinsky Women's School was carried out by two boards of the school: the board of trustees and the Pedagogical Board. The general management of the school was in charge of the School Council, subordinate to the West Siberian Governor-General, the first chairman of this council was the governor V. A. Artsimovich, and his wife A. N. Zhemchuzhnikova became the first trustee.

On 30 August 1855, at the Mariinsky Women's School, the second department was assigned to the II category, and the first department to the III category. In the first section, such subjects were studied as: the beginning of arithmetic, calligraphy, reading, the Law of God, craft and needlework. The second department studied such subjects as: Russian language, arithmetic, calligraphy, geography of Russia, history, the Law of God, household and needlework. Subsequently, the school introduced: geography, general history, French, dancing and drawing. On 1 July 1858, the Alexander Orphanage was opened as part of the school to receive orphans for training in the first department. On 5 November 1859, Governor-General G. H. Gasford approved the Regulations according to which at the Mariinsky Women's School, the first department was equated to the course of study at county schools, and the second department was closer to the gymnasium course of study. On 7 February 1860, three classes (lower, middle and higher) were opened in the second department of the school with two-year courses of study. Upon completion of the full course of the school, graduates received a certificate of teachers of women's 2-digit and rural schools, as well as women's gymnasiums.

On 3 September 1867, the building of the second department of the school was completely burned out after a fire in Tobolsk, and with the permission of Empress Maria Alexandrovna, the Fourth Department of His Imperial Majesty's Own Chancellery from 1867 to 1871 allocated 22,000 rubles for the repair of school buildings. On 24 July 1868, Grand Duke Vladimir Alexandrovich visited the school, in honor of this visit, a scholarship named after him was established at the school. On 1 June 1873, Grand Duke Alexander Alexandrovich, the future Emperor Alexander III, visited the school.

In 1919, the last graduation of the school was carried out and after the establishment of Soviet power, it was closed. On the basis of the Mariinsky school, the Tobolsk school of the second stage No. 1 was created.

== Patrons ==
- Empress Maria Alexandrovna

== Trustees ==
- Spouses of Tobolsk governors from 1854 to 1918

== Notable teachers ==
- Mikhail Znamensky
- Alexy (Molchanov)
- Innokenty (Belyaev)

== Famous graduates ==
- Ussakovskaya, Maria Mikhailovna

== Literature ==
- "Институты женские". Brockhaus and Efron Encyclopedic Dictionary: In 86 Volumes (82 Volumes and 4 Additional Volumes) (in Russian). St. Petersburg: F. A. Brockhaus. 1890–1907.
- Материалы об истории Тобольской Мариинской женской школы. Историческая записка 1854–1877 / ГБУТО ГА. Ф. 165. Оп. 1. Ед.хр. 30.
- Тобольская Мариинская гимназия. Историческая записка о первом женском учеб- ном заведении Тобольска. К 140-летнему юбилею / Сост. Г.К. Скачкова, ред. Г.Т. Бонифатьева. Тобольск, 1992.
- Скачкова Г.К. Из истории первой женской школы Тобольска // Исторический опыт народного образования Тюменского края: Историография, источниковедение. Тобольск, 1999.
- История народного образования в Российской империи в архивных документах, 1802—1917 гг.: справочник / Д.И. Раскин; Санкт-Петербургский государственный университет (СПбГУ): Санкт-Петербург: 2020. — 1068 с.
- Закрытые женские институты Российской империи. 1764—1855 / Пономарева В.В., изд: Пятый Рим Москва: 2019. — 480 с. — ISBN 978-5604332726

== Sources ==
- "165 лет назад (1854) в г. Тобольске была открыта Мариинская школа для девочек, положившая начало женскому образованию в Сибири". Тюменская областная научная библиотека имени Д. И. Менделеева.
- "22 июля 1854 года в Тобольске открылась Мариинская женская школа".
