= Soviet submarine K-431 =

Echo-II class cruise missile submarine of the Soviet Navy

History

Soviet Union
- Name: K-431
- Builder: Leninskiy Komsomol Shipyard, Komsomolsk-on-Amur
- Laid down: 11 January 1964
- Launched: 8 September 1964
- Commissioned: 30 September 1965
- Decommissioned: 16 September 1987
- Fate: Scrapped

General characteristics
- Class & type: Echo-class submarine
- Displacement: 4,415 long tons (4,486 t) surfaced; 5,760 long tons (5,852 t) submerged
- Length: 115.4 m (378 ft 7 in)
- Beam: 9.3 m (30 ft 6 in)
- Draught: 7.4 m (24 ft 3 in)
- Propulsion: 2 × pressurized water-cooled reactors 70,000 hp (52 MW) each, 2 steam turbines, 2 shafts
- Speed: 14 knots (26 km/h; 16 mph) surfaced; 22 knots (41 km/h; 25 mph) submerged
- Range: 18,000–30,000 nmi (33,000–56,000 km; 21,000–35,000 mi)
- Endurance: 50 days
- Test depth: 300 m (984 ft)
- Complement: 104-109 men (including 29 officers)
- Armament: 8 × P-6 cruise missiles; 4 × 533 mm (21 in) bow torpedo tubes; 2 × 400 mm (16 in) stern torpedo tubes

K-431 (Russian: К-431; originally the K-31) was a Soviet nuclear-powered submarine that had a reactor accident on 10 August 1985. It was commissioned on 30 September 1965. The 1985 explosion occurred during refueling of the submarine at Chazhma Bay, Dunay, Vladivostok. There were ten fatalities and 49 other people suffered radiation injuries. Time magazine has identified the accident as one of the world's "worst nuclear disasters".

== Reactor refuelling disaster ==
K-431, completed around 1965 as unit K-31, was a Project 675 or Echo II-class submarine with two pressurized water reactors, each of 70 MW_{t} capacity and using 20%-enriched uranium as fuel. On 10 August 1985, the submarine was being refuelled at the Chazhma Bay naval facility near Vladivostok. The submarine had been refuelled and the reactor tank lid was being replaced. The lid was laid incorrectly and had to be lifted again with the control rods attached. A beam was supposed to prevent the lid from being lifted too far, but this beam was positioned incorrectly, and the lid with control rods was lifted up too far. At 10:55 AM the starboard reactor became prompt critical, resulting in a criticality excursion of about 5·10^{18} fissions and a thermal/steam explosion. The explosion expelled the new load of fuel, destroyed the machine enclosures, ruptured the submarine's pressure hull and aft bulkhead, and partially destroyed the fuelling shack, with the shack's roof falling 70 metres away in the water. A fire followed, which was extinguished after 4 hours, after which assessment of the radioactive contamination began. Most of the radioactive debris fell within 50–100 metres (160–330 ft) of the submarine, but a cloud of radioactive gas and particulates blew to the north-west across a 6 km (3.7 mi) stretch of the Dunay Peninsula, missing the town of Shkotovo-22, 1.5 km (0.93 mi) from the dock. The contaminated forest area was later surveyed as 2 km^{2} (490 acres) in a swath 3.5 km (2.2 mi) long and 200 to 650 m (660 to 2,130 ft) wide. Initial estimates of the radioactive release were about 74 PBq (2 MCi) of noble gases and 185 PBq (5 MCi) of other fission products, but most of this was short-lived isotopes; the estimated release inventory one hour after the accident was about 37 TBq (1000 Ci) of non-noble fission products. In part because the reactor contained no accumulated spent nuclear fuel, the fraction of biologically active isotopes was far smaller than in the case of the Chernobyl disaster.

M. Takano et al. suggest that only 29 GBq of ^{131}I was released, but larger amounts (620 GBq of ^{133}I and 1840 GBq of ^{135}I) of other isotopes. The same source suggests that the total release was about 259 PBq but due to radioactive decay this decreased to 43 TBq after 24 hours. The same source suggests that the fission yield was 5·10^{18} fissions (1.95mg of U-235 fissioned) which would deliver 156 MJ (37.3kg TNT equivalent) of heat into the reactor.

Ten naval personnel were killed (8 officers and 2 enlisted men), probably by the explosion itself and not from radiation injuries. Radiation injuries were observed in 49 people, with 10 developing radiation sickness; the latter figure included mostly firefighters, some of whom sustained doses up to 220 rad (2.2 Gy) external and 400 rem (4 Sv) to the thyroid gland. Of the 2,000 involved in clean-up operations, 290 were exposed to higher levels of radiation compared to the normal standards.

High-level waste gathered during clean-up operations was placed in temporary disposal sites. Due to the rapid decay of most of the fission products and the cleanup operations, some dockyard facilities resumed operations four days later. About two months post-accident the radioactivity in water in the cove was comparable to background levels, and 5–7 months post-accident the radiation levels were considered normal throughout the dock area. The damaged submarine was towed to Pavlovsk Bay and berthed there.

== Bibliography ==
- Polmar, Norman & Noot, Jurrien (1991). Submarines of the Russian and Soviet Navies, 1718–1990. Annapolis, Maryland: Naval Institute Press. ISBN 0-87021-570-1.
- Vilches Alarcón, Alejandro A. (2022). From Juliettes to Yasens: Development and Operational History of Soviet Cruise-Missile Submarines. Europe @ War (22). Warwick, UK: Helion & Co. ISBN 978-1-915070-68-5.
