= Mikhail Znamensky =

Russian painter

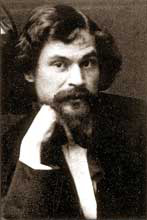
- Born: Mikhail Stepanovich Znamensky; Михаи́л Степа́нович Зна́менский; 26 May 1833; Kurgan, Russian Empire
- Died: 15 March 1892 (aged 58); Tobolsk, Russian Empire
- Occupations: Writer, memoirist, ethnographer, artist, caricaturist

Mikhail Stepanovich Znamensky (Russian: Михаи́л Степа́нович Зна́менский, 26 May 1833, Kurgan, Imperial Russia—15 March 1892, Tobolsk, Imperial Russia) was a Russian writer, memoirist, painter, caricaturist, archeologist and ethnographer.

Znamensky, who knew many of the Decembrists personally through his father, protoiereus Stepan Znamensky (who was canonized by Russian Orthodox Church in 1984, as Stefan Omsky), is credited with having authored the first ever Russian novel on the Decemberists, The Vanished Men (Исчезнувшие люди, 1872). Part two, Tobolsk of the Forties (Тобольск сороковых годов, 1884), was serialized by the newspaper Vostochnoye obozreniye (Восточное обозрение, The Eastern Review). Part three, The Fifties in Tobolsk (Пятидесятые годы в Тобольске) remained unfinished.

Znamensky left numerous drawings and paintings which include the portraits of the Decembrists he had known, as well as the illustrations to the works by Pyotr Yershov, Ivan Goncharov and Kondraty Ryleyev, among many others. Iskra published more than 300 of his caricatures, most of them depicting the life of Siberian provinces.

Znamensky left important memoirs on Pyotr Yershov, Matvey Muravyov-Apostol, Ivan Pushchin, Vasily Tisengausen and Ivan Yakushkin, and authored several ethnographical works, mostly on Tobolsk and its surroundings. Two streets, one in Tobolsk, another in Khanty-Mansiysk, bear his name.
