= Ivan Pushchin =

Russian writer and judge (1798–1859)

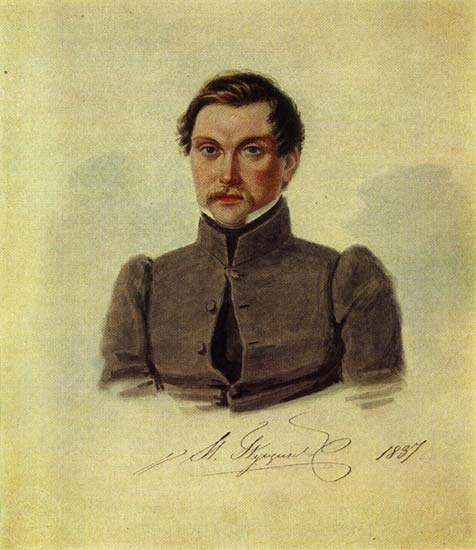
Ivan Pushchin; portrait by Nikolay Bestuzhev (c.1837)

Ivan Ivanovich Pushchin (Russian:Иван Иванович Пущин; 15 May 1798, Moscow — 15 April 1859, Bronnitsky Uyezd) was a Russian civil servant and Decembrist. In school, he became a close friend of the writer, Alexander Pushkin, due to the similarity of their names.

== Biography ==
He was born to Lieutenant-General Ivan Petrovich Pushchin and his wife, Alexandra née Ryabinina. From 1811 to 1817, he studied at the Tsarskoye Selo Lyceum, then served in the Life Guards Horse Artillery until 1822; rising to the rank of Podporuchik (Lieutenant). Shortly after leaving the Lyceum, he had joined a secret youth society, the Sacred Artel; a precursor to the Decembrists. Later, he joined the Union of Salvation. When it was disbanded, he joined the Decembrists (originally known as the Welfare Union).

In 1823, after he came into conflict with Grand Duke Michael Pavlovich, he was dismissed from the military and took a position with the Saint Petersburg Court's criminal division. This was followed by service as judge on the Moscow Court of Justice. At that time, the judiciary was held in little respect by the nobility.

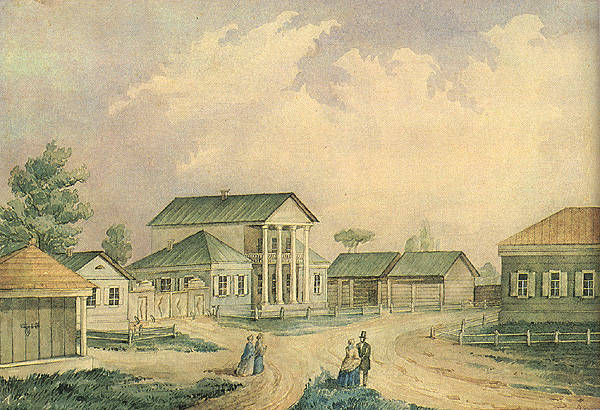
Pushchin's house in Yalutorovsk, by Avgusta Sozonovich

In late 1825, he went to Mikhailovsky, a village in Pskov Oblast, to tell his friend Pushkin about the existence of the Decembrists. He then went to Saint Petersburg, arriving just in time to take part in the uprising. He narrowly missed being shot on several occasions. The next day, another old friend from the Lyceum, the future statesman Alexander Gorchakov, risked his career to offer him assistance in obtaining a passport for London. He refused, saying he had no right to run away and abandon his comrades.

He was arrested, tried by the Supreme Criminal Court, and found guilty of participating in an action with regicidal intent. This brought a sentence of death, which was commuted to life imprisonment. That summer, he was taken to Shlisselburg Fortress. Later, he was transferred to Siberia, where he performed hard labor in the villages of Chita and Petrovsk-Zabaykalsky. After twenty years, he was taken to Turinsk (where he supposedly did nothing but read books), then settled in Yalutorovsk, where he became involved in agriculture. He also kept in touch with other Decembrists, and tried to help any in need.

In 1856, he finally returned from exile. At the request of Yevgeny Yakushkin, the son of Ivan Yakushkin, one of the first Decembrists, he wrote his memoirs, including his recollections of Pushkin. These were published in several parts, in a variety of media, notably the journal, Athenaeum. In 1857, he married Natalya Fonvizina, the widow of a fellow Decembrist, Mikhail Fonvizin, who had died not far from where Pushchin was staying, in Bronnitsky Uyezd. He spent his final years at his brother-in-law's estate, where he died, and was interred at the local cathedral. A street and the regional library in Turinsk have been named after him.

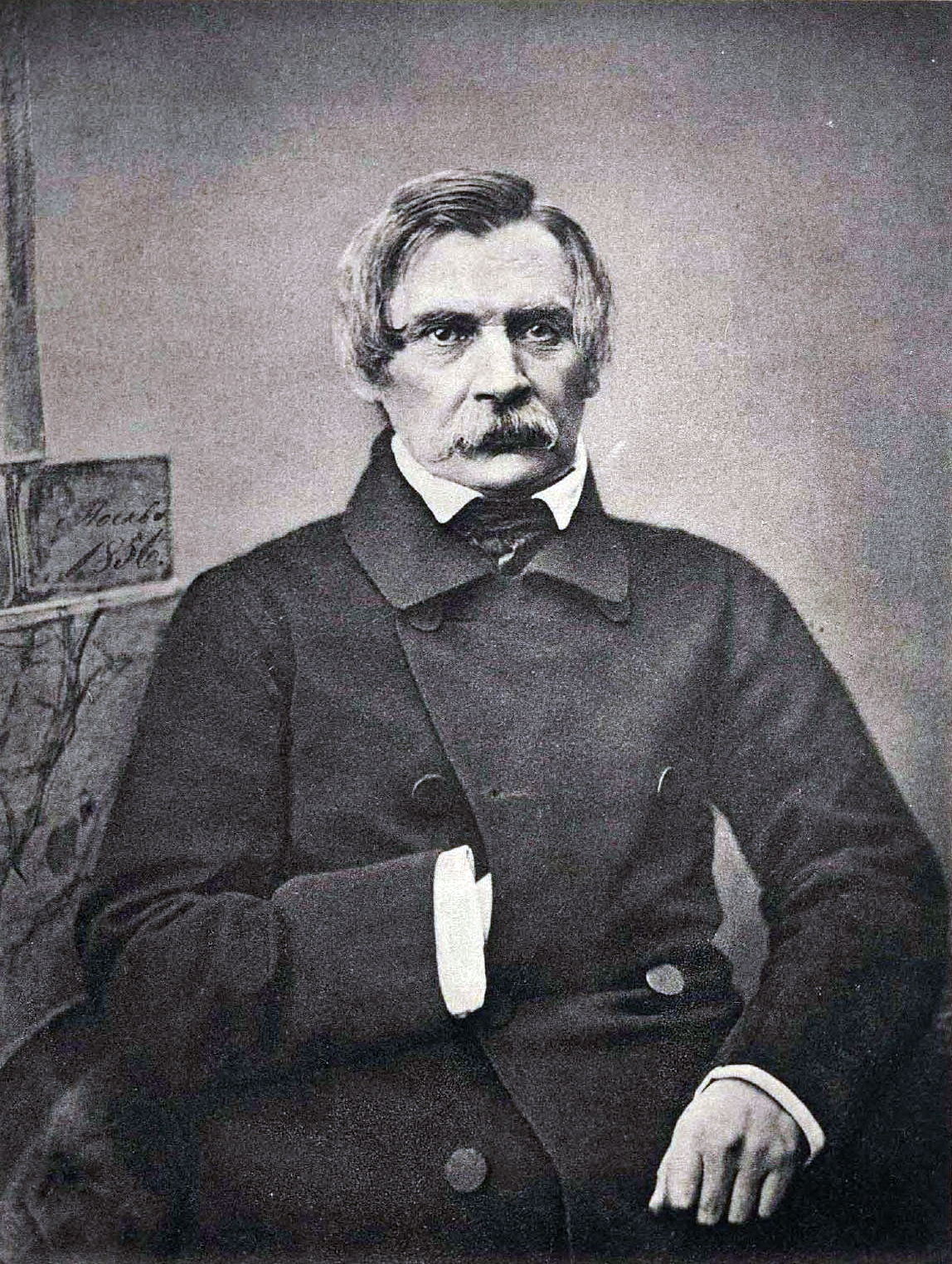
Pushchin in 1856
