= Fokino, Primorsky Krai =

Closed town in Primorsky Krai, Russia

Fokino Фокино
- Town
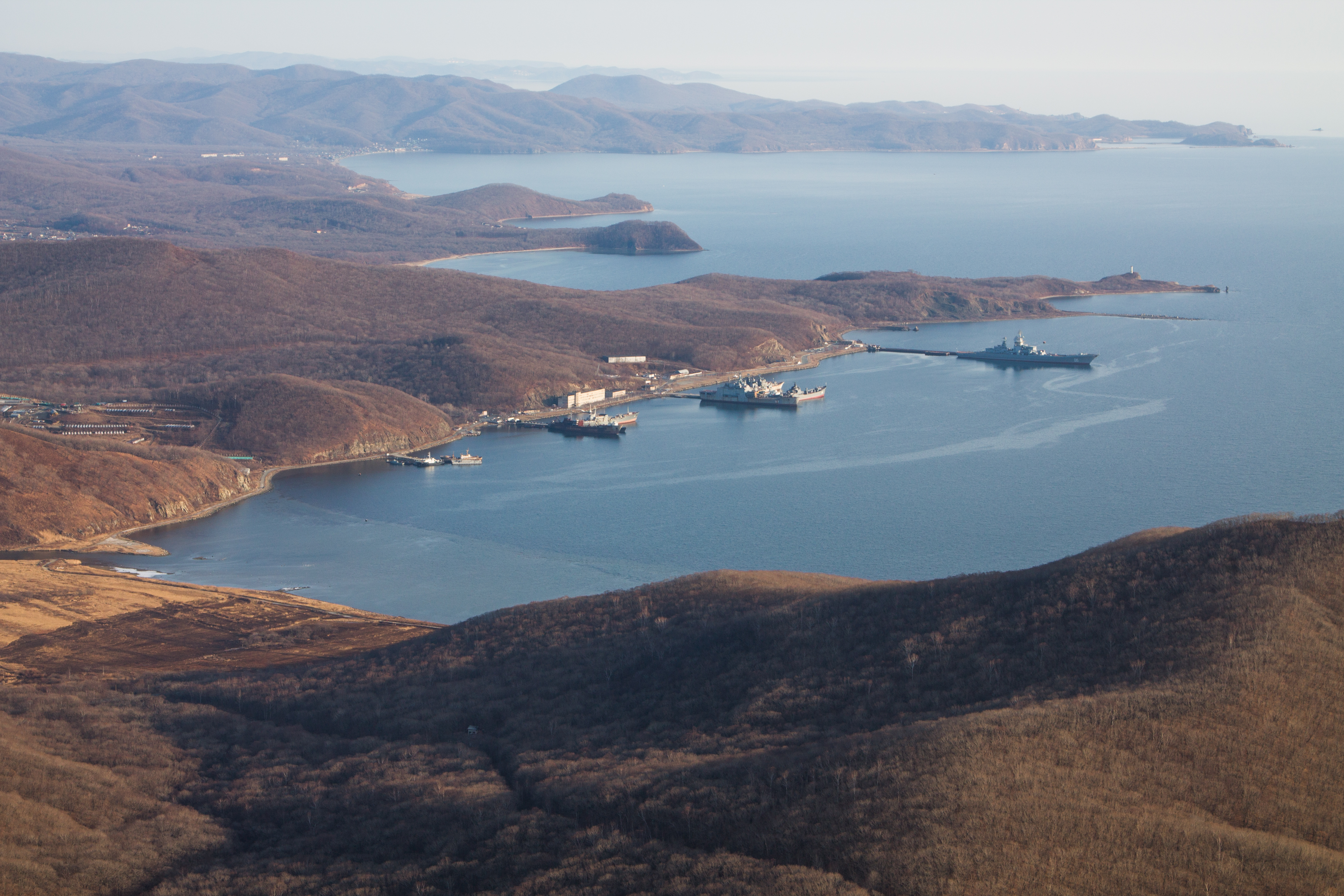

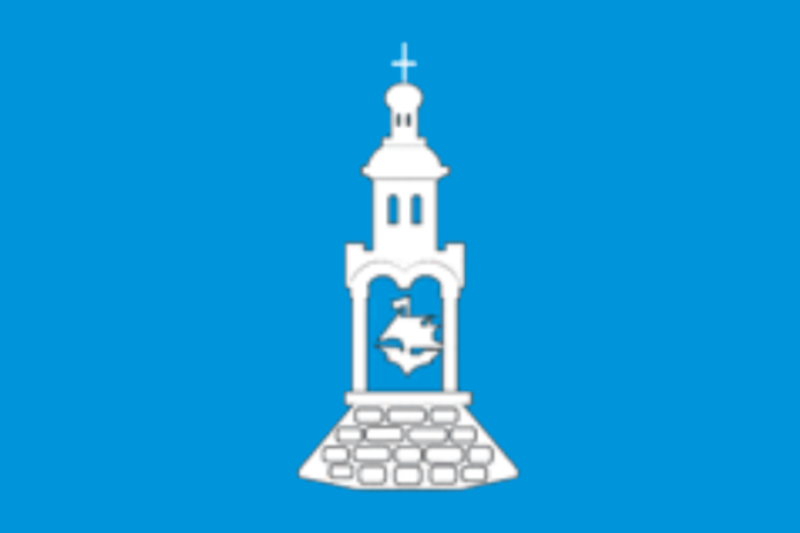
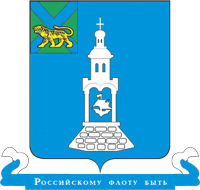
- Flag Coat of arms
- Interactive map of Fokino
- Location of Fokino Fokino (Primorsky Krai)
- Coordinates: 42°58′N 132°24′E
- Country: Russia
- Federal subject: Primorsky Krai
- Founded: October 4, 1980
- Town status since: October 4, 1980

Government
  - Head: Pavel Posvezhenny
- Elevation: 40 m (130 ft)

Population (2010 Census)
  - Total: 23,696
  - Estimate (2023): 19,427 (−18%)

Administrative status
  - Subordinated to: Fokino Town Under Krai Jurisdiction
  - Capital of: Fokino Town Under Krai Jurisdiction

Municipal status
  - Urban okrug: Fokino Urban Okrug
  - Capital of: Fokino Urban Okrug
- Time zone: UTC+10 (MSK+7)
- Postal codes: 692880, 692881
- Dialing code: +7 42339
- OKTMO ID: 05747000001
- Website: adm.fokino-prim.ru

Fokino (Russian: Фо́кино) is a closed town in Primorsky Krai, Russia, located on the coast of the Peter the Great Gulf, on the Abrek Bay, about 45 kilometers (28 mi) south of Vladivostok, the administrative center of the krai. Population: 23,696 (2010 census); 26,457 (2002 census).

It was previously known as Tikhookeansky (until 1980), Shkotovo-17 (until 1994).

== History ==
The village of Promyslovka was founded on the current site of Fokino in 1891. Promyslovka was granted urban-type settlement status in 1958, and the nearby naval village of Tikhookeansky followed suit in 1963. The settlements grew together, were merged, and were granted town status on October 4, 1980. However, due to its status as a base for the Russian Pacific Fleet, the town was closed, and referred to officially under the code name Shkotovo-17. Since 1994, Fokino has been the official name of the town.

After the APEC-2012 Summit was held in Vladivostok, Fokino will become the main naval base at the Russian Far East, where the Russian Pacific Fleet will be attached.

== Administrative and municipal status ==
Within the framework of administrative divisions, it is, together with two urban-type settlements (Dunay and Putyatin), incorporated as Fokino Town Under Krai Jurisdiction—an administrative unit with the status equal to that of the districts. As a municipal division, Fokino Town Under Krai Jurisdiction is incorporated as Fokino Urban Okrug.

== Tourism ==
It is a closed town because the Russian Pacific Fleet is based there. Foreigners must have a special permit to visit the town. However, the islands of Putyatin and Askold, which are a part of the territory administered by the town, are open for visits by tourists. Up to two thousand tourists visit Putyatin every year. They are attracted by the unique flora and fauna in the waters surrounding this island and its underwater landscape. Approximately 2,400 people inhabit Putyatin Island. Their main occupation is catching and processing sea products, breeding mink and spotted deer.

There is no permanent population on Askold. It is rarely visited by tourists because of the absence of regular transport connections with the mainland, and the status of the island which until 1995 had formed part of the Reserve where no economic activity was allowed. There are deposits of gold estimated at dozens of tonnes on Askold.

== Climate ==
Climate data for Fokino
Month	Jan	Feb	Mar	Apr	May	Jun	Jul	Aug	Sep	Oct	Nov	Dec	Year
Mean daily maximum °C (°F)	−7.5 (18.5)	−4.4 (24.1)	2.5 (36.5)	9.8 (49.6)	15.1 (59.2)	17.6 (63.7)	21.9 (71.4)	24.1 (75.4)	20.6 (69.1)	14.0 (57.2)	4.3 (39.7)	−4.0 (24.8)	9.5 (49.1)
Daily mean °C (°F)	−11.4 (11.5)	−8.5 (16.7)	−1.5 (29.3)	5.5 (41.9)	10.5 (50.9)	14.2 (57.6)	18.7 (65.7)	21.0 (69.8)	16.8 (62.2)	9.8 (49.6)	0.5 (32.9)	−7.8 (18.0)	5.6 (42.2)
Mean daily minimum °C (°F)	−15.2 (4.6)	−12.5 (9.5)	−5.5 (22.1)	1.3 (34.3)	6.0 (42.8)	10.8 (51.4)	15.5 (59.9)	17.9 (64.2)	13.1 (55.6)	5.7 (42.3)	−3.2 (26.2)	−11.5 (11.3)	1.9 (35.4)
Average precipitation mm (inches)	13 (0.5)	16 (0.6)	24 (0.9)	47 (1.9)	65 (2.6)	90 (3.5)	105 (4.1)	139 (5.5)	114 (4.5)	62 (2.4)	36 (1.4)	20 (0.8)	731 (28.7)
Source: Climate-Data.org
