= Sculpture of Mongolia =

Works of sculpture have been crafted in Mongolia since prehistoric times. Bronze Age megaliths known as deer stones depicted deer in an ornamented setting. Statues of warriors, the Kurgan stelae, were created under Turkic rule from the 6th century CE, and later started to bear inscriptions in a phonetic script, the Orkhon script, which were deciphered only in the 1980s. Warrior statues continued under the Uighurs, who also made a gold image of the Buddha. Many examples of sculptures of people and animals, as well as carved stelae, are known from the Mongol Empire, especially from its capital Karakorum.

The spread of Buddhism in Mongolia from the 16th century was associated with a cultural revival which included the work of the sculptor Zanabazar (1635–1723), famous for his human forms in bronze depicting figures from the Buddhist tradition. Also known from this period are the ornate masks used in the mystic Cham dances.

A sharp change in Mongolian art followed the revolution of 1921, after which the country remained under strong Soviet influence. Buddhism lost its hold, and much sculpture in public places adopted the Socialist realist style. Later Western influences introduced Modernism to sculpture, and since the overthrow of the socialist regime in 1990, abstract and traditional styles have been explored.

== Bronze age sculpture ==
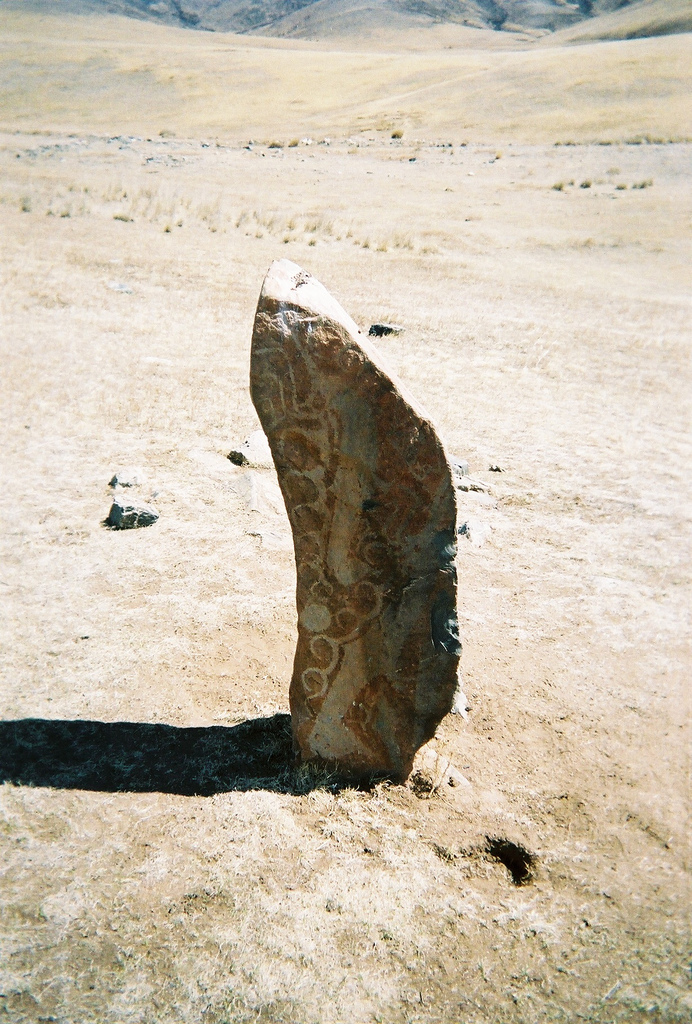
Deer stone

The most striking artifacts of ancient Mongolian sculpture are deer stones (called “буган чулуу” (bugan chuluu) in Mongolian), which are widespread in the regions of the Mongolian Altai ridge and Khangai mountains. The art of depicting deer on stones, popular in Western Eurasia and Central Asia during the Bronze Age, belongs to the Scytho-Siberian style. About 500 deer stones (making up 80% of all known in the vast Eurasian steppe zone) are concentrated in the north and northwest of Mongolia.

Most scholars estimate that Bronze Age nomads erected the graceful and mysterious megaliths throughout the northern regions of Mongolia and southern Siberia around 1000 BCE, though some scholars think they may be the work of later, Iron Age peoples who appeared by 700 BCE in Mongolia. There are pictures of the sun and moon near the top of the deer stones below which is a line of a geometric ornament. Then there are the pictures of deer characterized as in a “flying gallop”. Below the deer depictions is another belt decorated with geometric ornaments. On rare specimens, a depiction of a human face is found. In the upper part of a deer stone discovered at a site named Shar-Us, there is a depiction of the disk of the sun on one side and a picture of a human face on the other side. The Scytho-Siberian style is also characteristic of the metal works of Bronze Age craftsmen. Handles of knives were decorated with figures of the head of a deer, ram or goat with enlarged ears, protruding eyes, and spiral horns. These objects belong to the Karasuk culture which originated in Mongolia and spread northwards to Siberia and southwards to Yin China.

== Medieval sculpture ==
The Xiongnu tribes who founded the first nomadic empire on the vast Mongolian steppes to the north of the Great Wall of China in the 3rd century BCE inherited the Scytho-Siberian style. Of particular interest is the silver plate with a yak embossed against the background of a woody mountain.

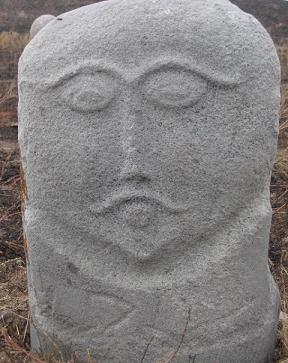
Kurgan stelae

From among the medieval empires in Mongolia, the Turkic Kaganate founded in the middle of the 6th century CE left behind the greatest number of sculptural monuments. Turkic kurgan stelae called “хүн чулуу” (khün chuluu) in Mongolian are found in the vast steppes and mountains. They were erected on burial mounds. The stone statues depict moustached warriors wearing belts from which their weapons are suspended. Their left hands grasp the belts as a sign of respect, and the right hands hold goblets.

The sculptural complexes dedicated to the memory of the Turkic advisor Tonyukuk and Turkic warlord Kul Tegin were built in the 8th century. The memorial complex of Kul Tegin was surrounded by a metre-wide wall. A two-storey building supported with 12 columns was at the centre of the complex and marble statues of Kul Tegin and his spouse were located in the building. The head of the statue of Kul Tegin is topped with a crown with a depiction of a bird spreading its wings.

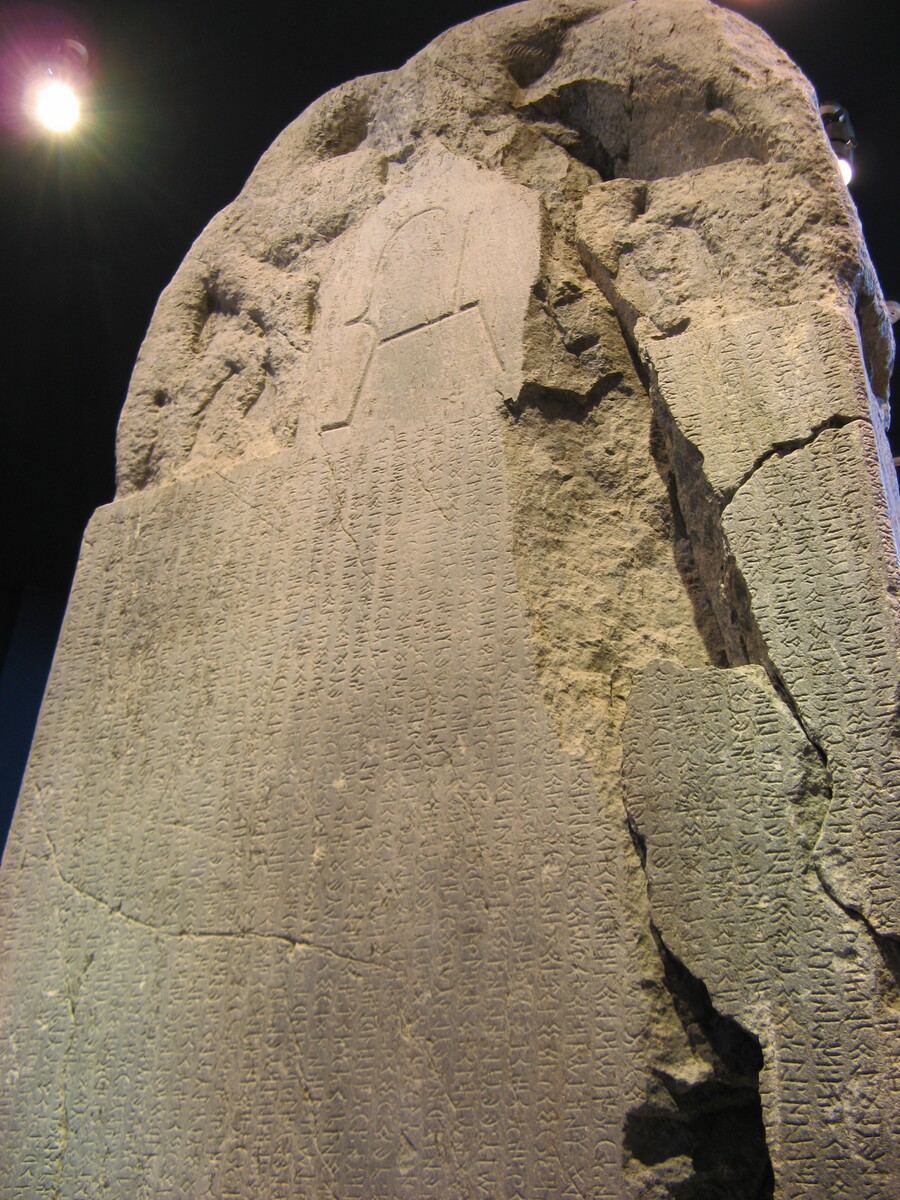
Stelae with runic text in the Turkic language

The Turks were the first among the Central Asian peoples to develop a phonetic script. Stelae with texts written in the runic Orkhon script devoted to Tonyukuk, Bilge Khagan and Kul Tegin are found in the central regions of Mongolia. These texts telling about the wars which the militant Turks fought to defend their national freedom from alien enemies were first read by N. M. Yadrintsev and Wilhelm Tomson in the 1980s.

Archeological findings demonstrate that the Uighurs who defeated the Turkic Kaganate and founded their own empire on the territory of Mongolia produced realistic-looking statues in honour of the outstanding warriors. In the 8th century Uighur Kagan Boguchar ordered a gold statue of Buddha Shakyamuni to be cast, which later was captured by the Mongol Khaans. The Khitan Empire, founded early in the 10th century, made enormous strides in the development of culture and scientific perception. Handicrafts such as weaving, metal smelting, and painting and sculpture were widely practiced.

== Sculpture of the Mongol Empire ==
The development of sculpture of imperial Mongol times has to be judged by the few but highly expressive samples of stone men, stele and decorative architectural elements. The stone figures in Sükhbaatar aimag are distinguished by their headdresses, clothes, ornaments, postures and seats. Important artifacts include the Stele of Genghis Khan documenting the achievement of Yesunke Mergen's art of archery, and the obelisk dedicated to Möngke Khaan. Such stele stood on the back of stone tortoises similar to those found around the capital of the Mongol Empire Karakorum.

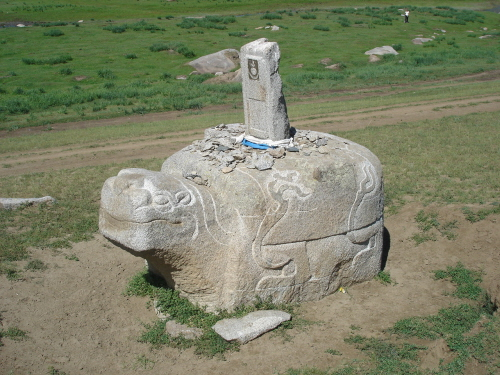
Stone tortoise of Karakorum

Archeological excavations of ancient Karakorum unearthed a wealth of heritage of the art of the period of the Mongol Empire. Palaces and temples were decorated with sculptures. The corners of the roofs were decorated with heads of winged dragons. A large number of figurines of creatures similar to phoenixes and chimeras as well as statuettes of humans in Buddhist clothing have been unearthed. One of the fragments of sculptures of women found in the ruins of Karakorum depicts a woman with big eyes, tender smile, half-open lips and hairpins in the form of flowers, and a happy expression reminiscent of the traditional Uighur school. The fragment of another statuette, even better proportioned, is that of a woman with regular Mongolian-type features.

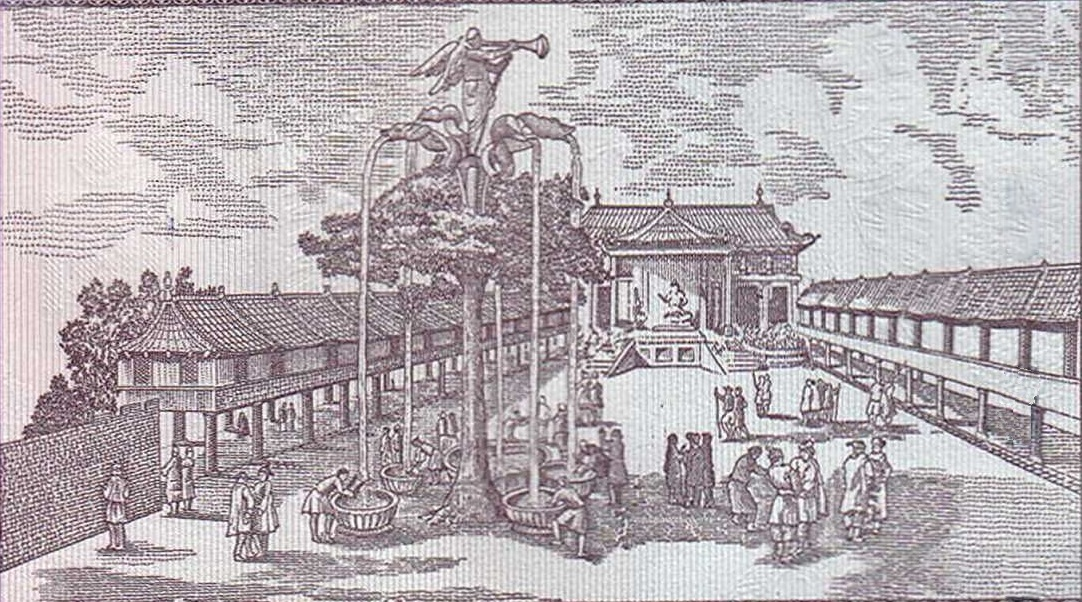
Silver Tree fountain in front of Tumen Amugulang Palace. 18th-century European imagination

Based on the records of William of Rubruck, most scholars maintain that in front of the palace was the Silver Tree (Мөнгөн мод) fountain. According to Rubruck, there were four silver sculptures of lions at the foot of the Silver Tree, and fermented mare's milk — airag, favourite drink of the Mongols — would run from their mouths. Four golden serpents twined round the tree. Wine would pour from the mouth of one serpent, airag from the mouth of the second serpent, mead from the third, and rice beer from the fourth. The top of the tree was crowned by an angel blowing a bugle. The branches, leaves and fruits of the tree were all made of silver. The fountain was designed by a captive sculptor William of Paris.

== Renaissance and Buddhism ==
=== G. Zanabazar and his school ===
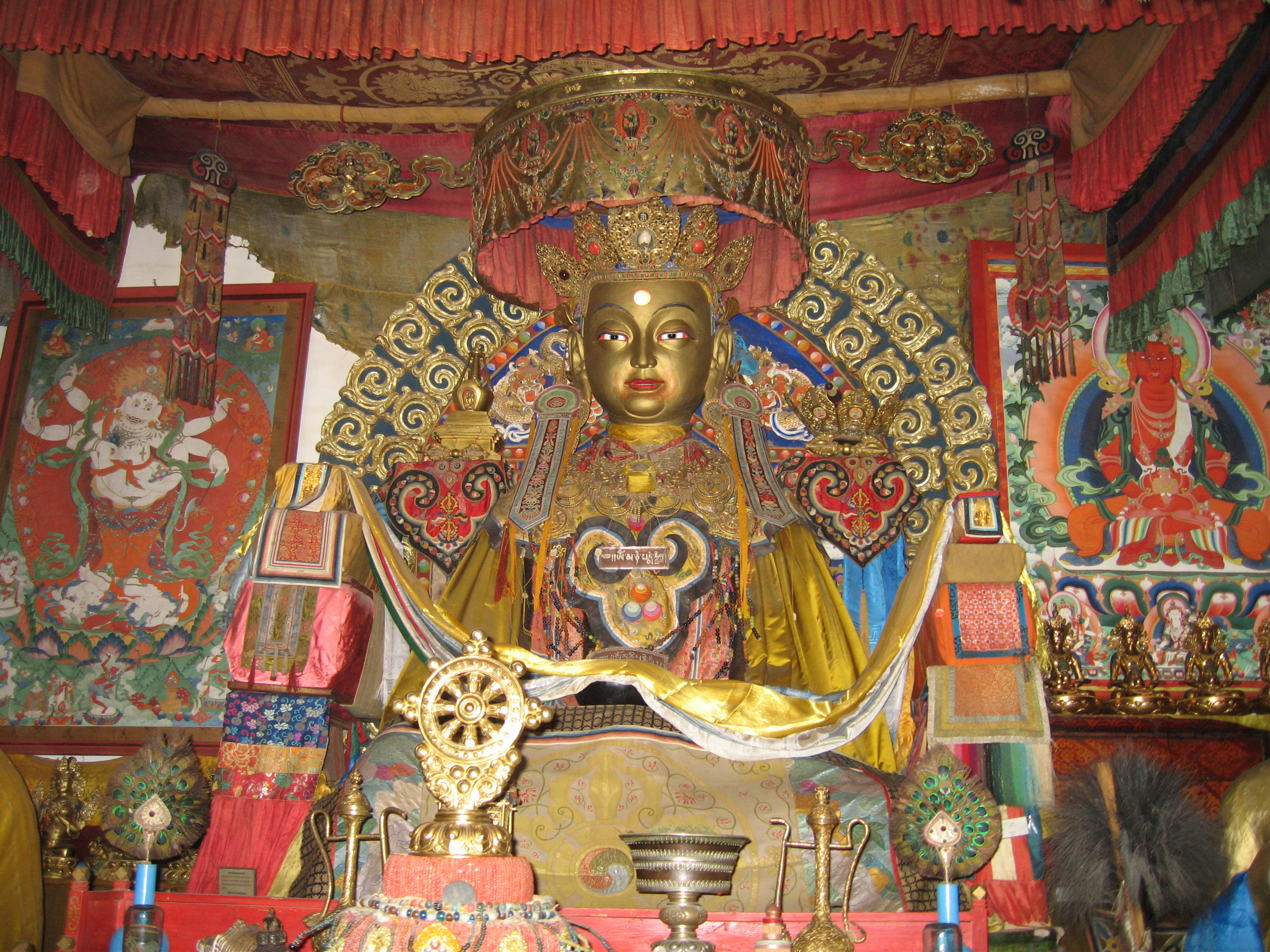
Statue of Buddha in Erdene Zuu Monastery

Reintroduction of Buddhism to Mongolia in the second half of the 16th century and its active penetration into all aspects of the Mongolian society directly influenced the further development and flourishing of sculpture and other arts in Mongolia. Competing with Altan Khan of Tümed in religious and cultural endeavours, Abtai Sain Khan of Khalkha founded the Buddhist monastery Erdenezuu near the site of former Karakorum city in 1585.

The Renaissance of culture of Mongolia is related with Borjigin G. Zanabazar (Өндөр Гэгээн) (1635–1723), the sculptor par excellence among the Buddhist countries of Asia, the first Jebtsundamba Khutuktu, or Bogdo Gegen, and the greatest sculptor of Mongolia. Among his most famous works are the gilt bronze statues of Green Tara, White Tara, Twenty-One Taras, the Five Dhyani Buddhas, and walking Maitreya. The facial features of Zanabazar's sculptures are characterized by high foreheads, thin, arching eyebrows, high-bridged noses, and small, fleshy lips. The jewelry is exquisite, especially the long simple strands of beads that hang across the figures' torsos. His works have a peaceful and contemplative look. The sculptures of Zanabazar and his school were generally made in two pieces: the body and the pedestal are made separately and then soldered together, though smaller sculptures were made in one piece. Most of the sculptures are gilded beautifully. Many of Zanabazar's works testify to his skill in depicting feminine beauty and his sculptures portray youthful figures and are beautifully proportioned.

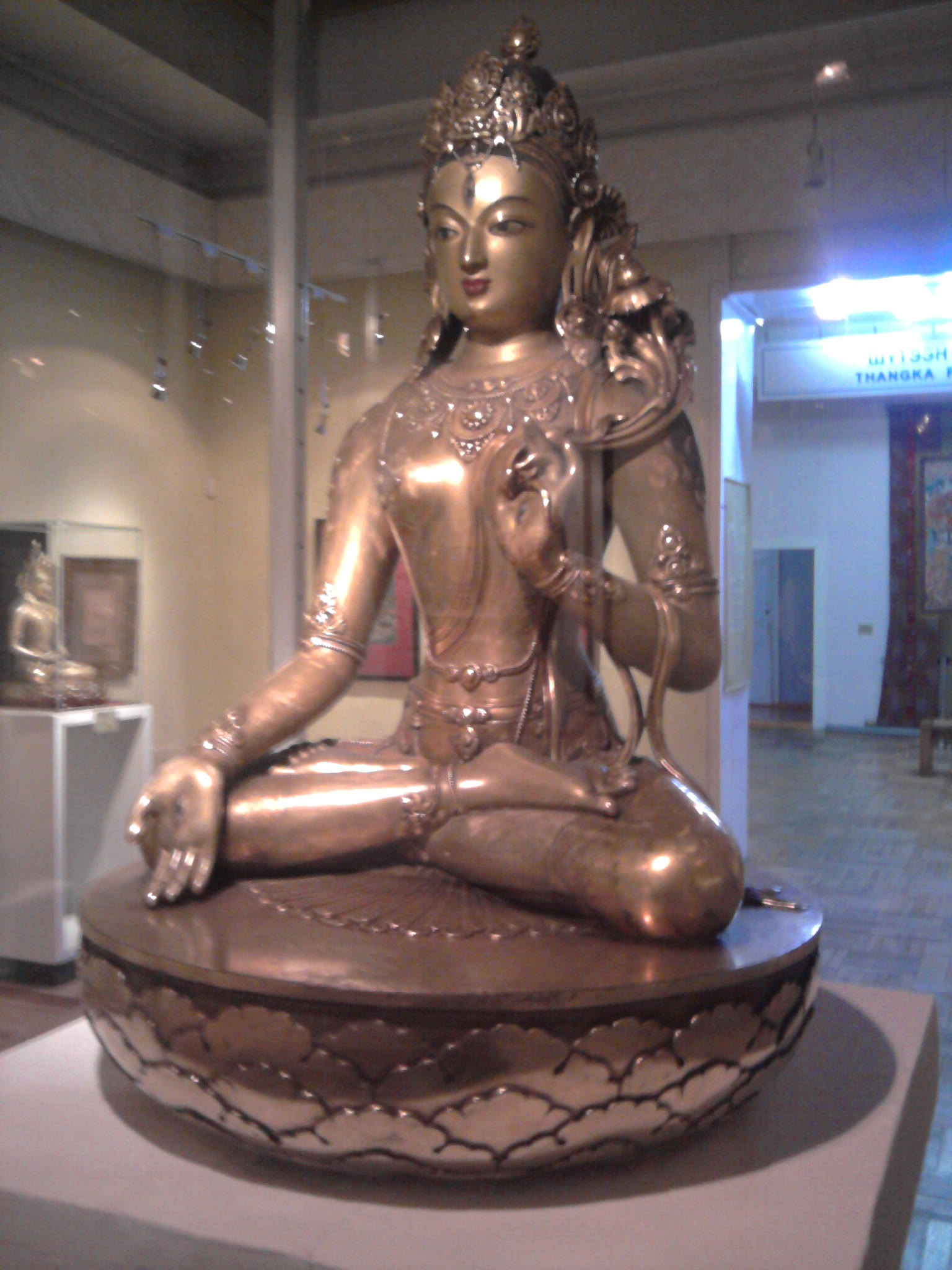
White Tara by Bogd Gegeen Zanabazar. A statue of the set of the Zanabazar's Five Dhyani Buddhas is in the background

He made White Tara an adolescent girl in early puberty, her fingers still retaining childish plumpness.

Green Tara by Bogd Gegeen Zanabazar. A statue of the set of the Zanabazar's the Twenty-One Taras is in the background

The statue of Green Tara is depicted as seated, and the full weight of her body has shifted onto the left buttock while the upper torso slants to the right in a circular movement. The whole posture is emphasised by the parallel rhythm of her right leg and right arm coming freely down in a mudra symbolising generosity and the horizontal line of her left leg in classical tucked up position providing firm support. Her breasts are young and full and her small waist curves gracefully. The left hand mudra depicts refuge in the three jewels: Buddha, Dharma and Sangha.

Vajradhara, the Dhyani Buddhas and other deities show the 32 main and 80 secondary features of an ideal human body. They are in harmony with the canonical proportions described in Tengyur. Especially beautiful are the faces of Zanabazar's Buddhas and Bodhisattvas in deep meditation. Guided by desire to liberate the people from wrath, ignorance, lust, contempt and ill will – the five vices giving rise to all sins - the sculptor created the Five Dhyani Buddhas in meditation. They are Akshobhya, the blue extirpator of wrath occupying the centre of the Mandala, Vairocana, the white extirpator of ignorance occupying the eastern part of the Mandala, Ratnasambhava, the yellow destroyer of contempt seated in the south, red Amitaba who roots out lust and sits in the west and green Amoghasiddhi, extirpator of ill will who dominates the north.

=== The art of Cham ===
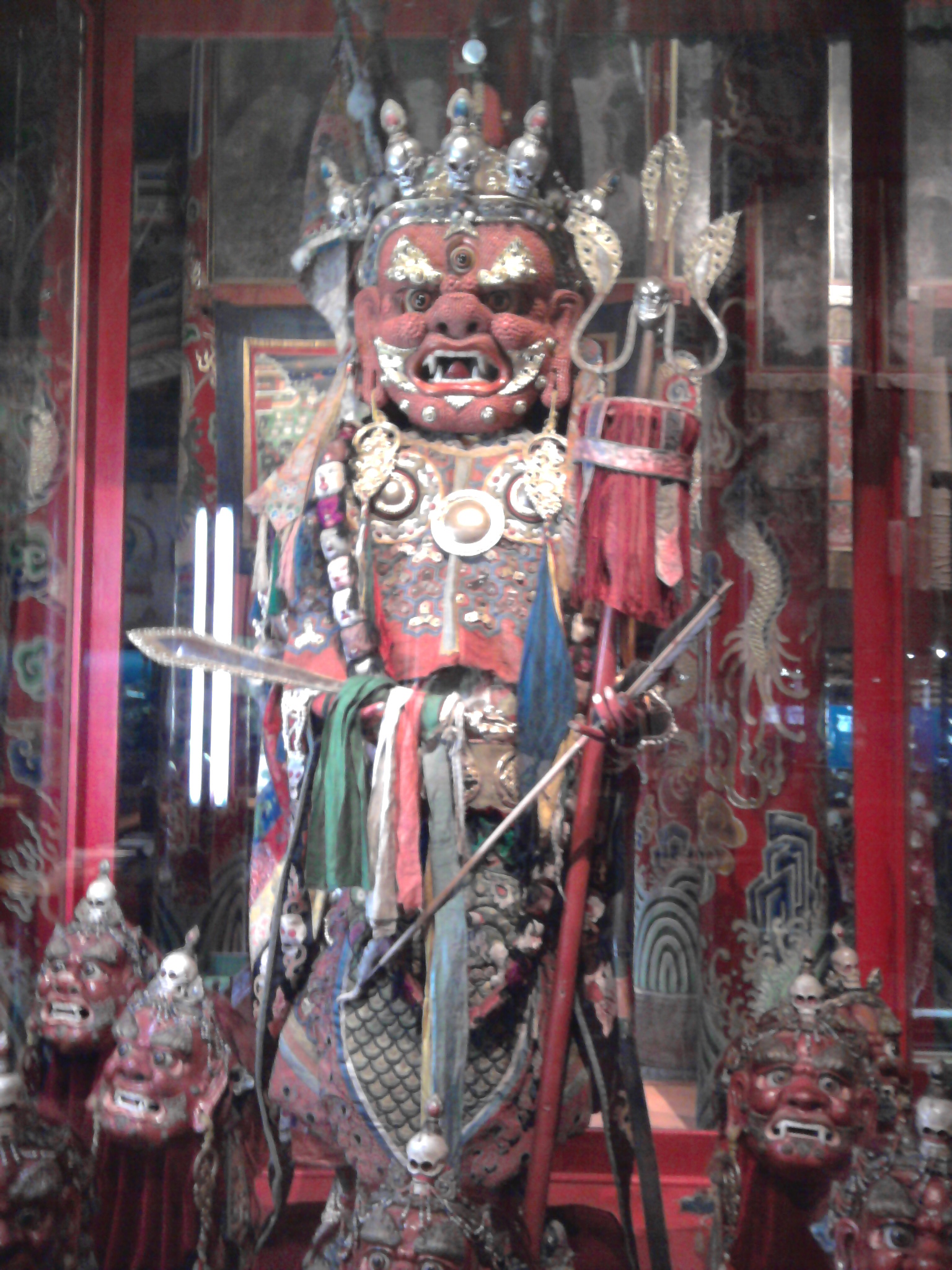
Zhamsran or Ulaan Sahius by Urga master Puntsog-Osor

The esoteric mystery dance called Cham was introduced to Mongolia along with the Tibetan Buddhism and flourished beginning in the 18th century. The first Cham ceremony in Khalkha was held in Erdene Zuu Monastery in the first decade of the 19th century.

Mongolian Cham is of special interest because this type of sacred performance attained during its brief life span in Mongolia a level never equaled elsewhere. Although Tibetan and Mongolian manuals which detail the iconography and outline the choreography of the Tsam exist, eyewitness accounts of early Western travelers imply that the dances actually differed in many ways from the manuals. Cham masks of Mongolian production, for example, have an artistic expressiveness only rarely matched in other countries. Preparation of the masks for Cham was a complex and time-consuming work. The shapes of the masks were first made of papier-mâché. At the end the masks were painted and gilded. The masks could be also finished with corals, pearls and jewels. The clothes were made of high-quality silk and certain elements of the accessories or symbolic attributes were made of corals, pearls, jewels, tusks and camel bone. Every monastery had its distinguishing style of masks and decorations. Thus, the masks at monastery Zhanzhing-Choiren were of the size to fit the heads of the dancers who could see through glassed cuts of the eyes of the masks. The masks in the Urga style were exceptionally large, twice as big as a human head adding extra height to the dancer who could see through the mouth of the mask. The mask of Dharmapala Zhamsran was made of papier-mâché; 6000 pieces of natural red coral of different sizes were inlaid along the oval face emphasizing the dynamics of the facial muscles. Dharmapalas or the Ten Khangal bodhisattvas were the main personages of Cham. Their wrathful images express the extent and depth of the efforts that are required in subduing the nisvanis—the vicious mind, the powerful inner enemy of each sentient being.

The masks are treated as sacred objects, just as Buddhist statues. When they are not in use, they were stored in monasteries and paid homage to in daily rituals.

== “Socialist realism” ==
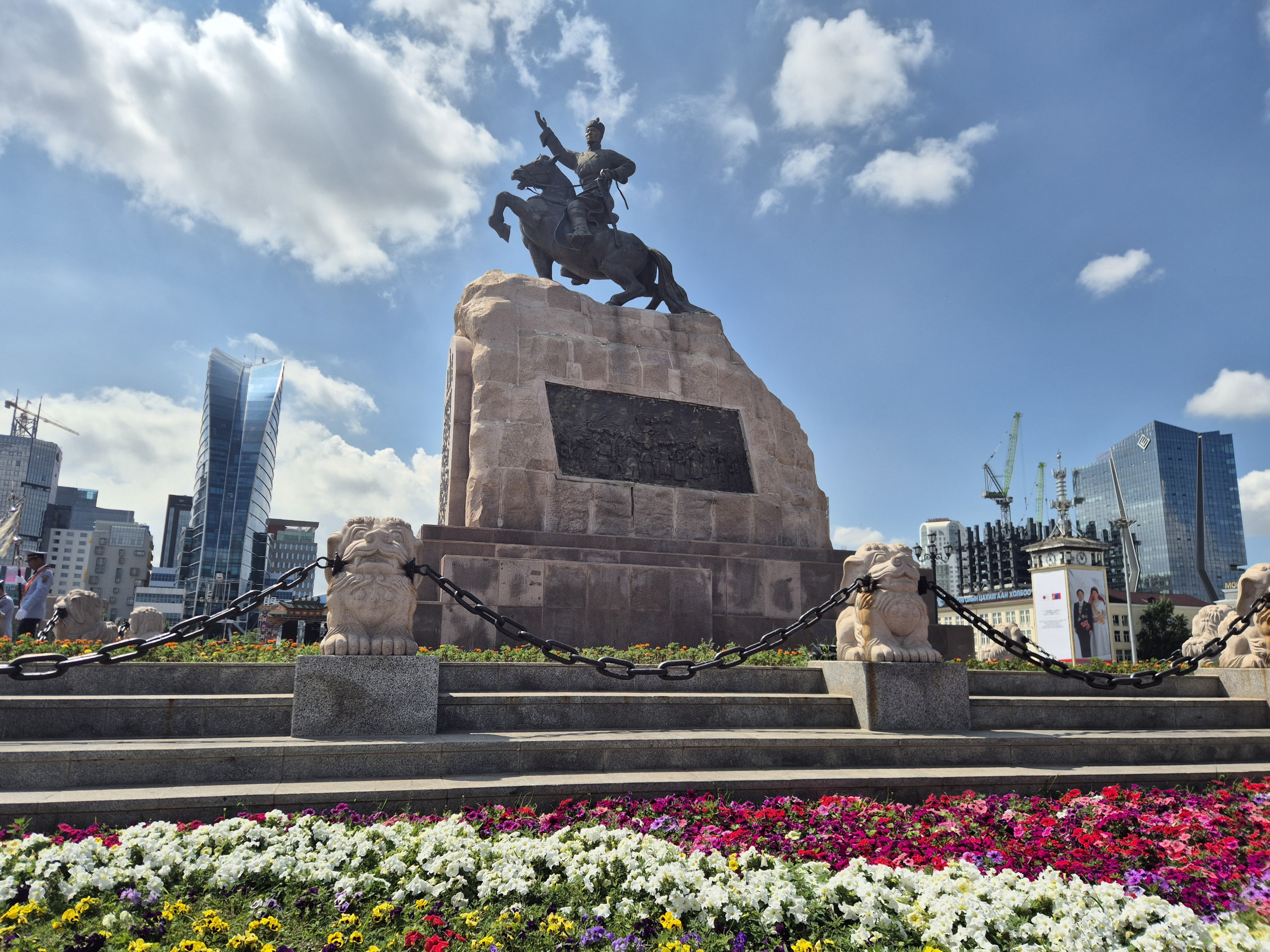
Statue of Sukhbaatar by S. Choimbol

The years following 1924 when Mongolia adopted the Communist principles were characterized by political purges and suppression of Buddhism. Many Mongolian artists were recruited to produce posters and other material that promoted the Communist ideology. As a result, Buddhist aesthetics were gradually replaced with Western techniques of fine arts. Throughout the 1930s and 1940s Soviet artists and teachers introduced their art in Mongolia and a number of Mongolian artists were sponsored to study in the Soviet Union. Through these means, Mongolian artists learned to use oil paints and became familiar with Socialist Realism as well as 19th century Russian Realism and Impressionism. Although Mongolian artists experimented with a variety of European styles, Socialist Realism was dominant during the era, depicting the lives of the people working hard together to develop the country. The best known specimen of sculpture of the period of Socialist Realism are the Equestrian statue of Sukhbaatar, one of the leaders of the Revolution of 1921, statues of a shepherd and peasant in front of the building of Ministry of Agriculture and the Zaisan Memorial for the Soviet soldier.

== Modernism and traditions ==
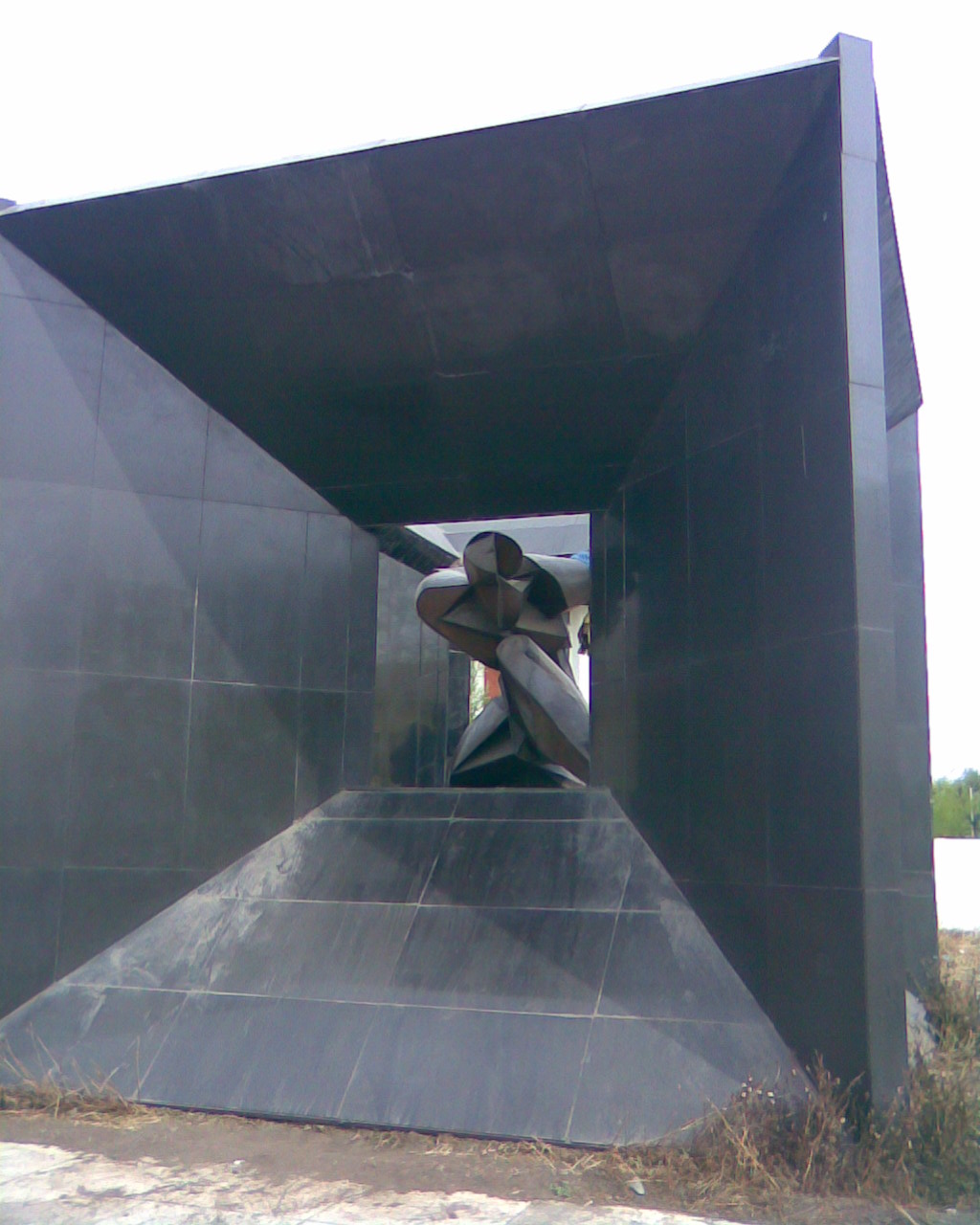
Monument to the victims of the political purges

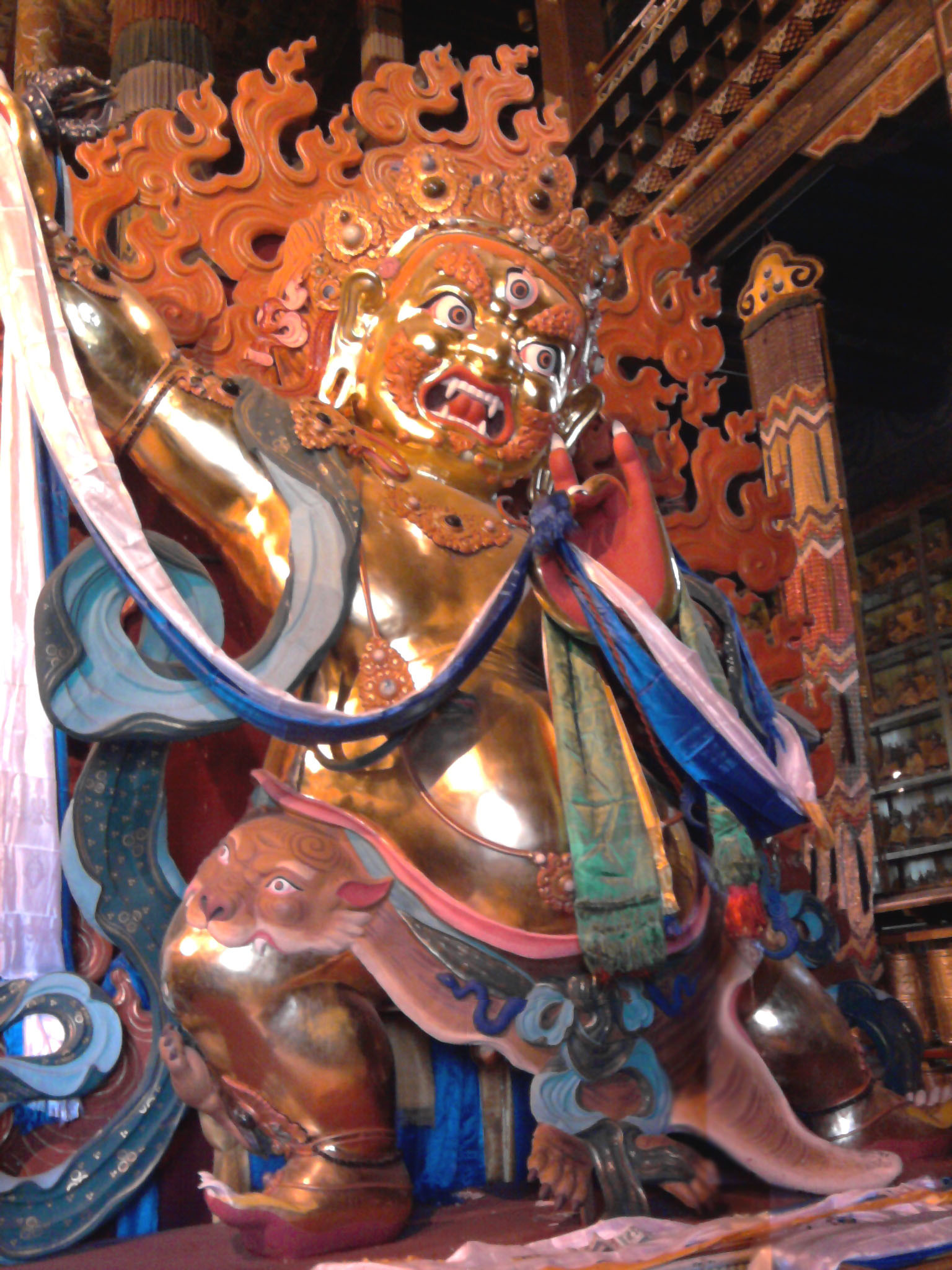
Statue of Vajrapani, protector of the Mongolian people, produced under leadership of Lam Ganchugiyn Purevbat

. In the 1960s, Mongolian artists began to study in countries such as East Germany and Czechoslovakia where they picked up Modernist art styles. These artists broadened the range of Mongolian artistic expression and adopted a greater degree of individualism. Although discouraged by the socialist government, Mongolian artists created increasingly free and emotional compositions. By the 1980s, greater numbers of artists returned from study in Europe and modernism was flourishing in Mongolia. The Democratic Revolution of 1990 opened Mongolia to the world and artists were completely free to paint any subject and travel to any country abroad. New artist groups were formed committed to modern and contemporary art in reaction to the dominance of Realism over the past decades. Previously taboo topics, such as the Mongol leader Genghis Khan, and abstract art styles were explored with passion.

At the same time, a revival of traditional art styles arose. Monk-artist Lam Ganchugiyn Purevbat is famous with his Modernist tankas and 3-dimensional mandalas.
