= Nikolay Bestuzhev =

Nikolay Alexandrovich Bestuzhev
- Николай Александрович Бестужев
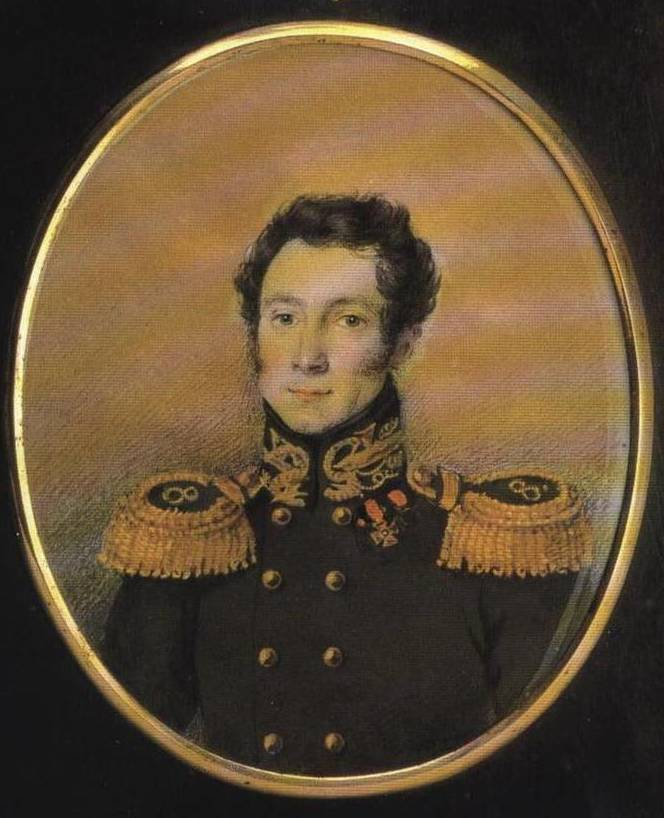
- Born: April 13, 1791; Saint Petersburg
- Died: May 27, 1855 (aged 64); Novoselenginsk

Nikolay Alexandrovich Bestuzhev (Russian: Николай Александрович Бестужев; 13 April 1791, Saint Petersburg – 27 May 1855, Novoselenginsk) was a Russian Navy officer, writer, inventor and portrait artist; associated with the Decembrist revolt.

== Biography ==
He was born to a noble family. His father, Alexander Fedoseyevich, was a writer and government councilor. His brothers, Alexander, Mikhail, Pyotr, and Pavel were also writers, military officers and Decembrists.

He entered the Sea Cadet Corps school in 1802 and graduated in 1809. While there, he audited classes taught by Andrey Voronikhin at the Imperial Academy of Arts. In 1810, he became a Lieutenant in the Corps. In 1815, he participated in naval actions in the Netherlands. He was appointed an Assistant Superintendent for the Baltic lighthouse in Kronstadt in 1820. Two years later, he reorganized the lithography department at the Admiralty, for which he was awarded the Order of Saint Vladimir, and began writing a history of the fleet.

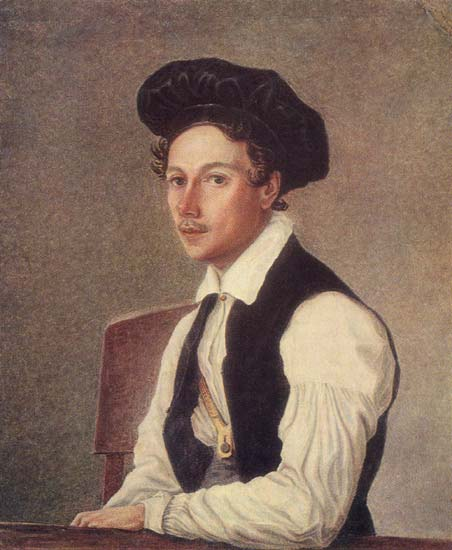
Portrait of his brother, Mikhail

In 1824, he was promoted to Lieutenant-Commander and, shortly after, was named Director of the Admiralty's museum, where he was known as "The Mummy". During this time he also contributed to the journals Polar Star (edited by his brother, Alexander) and Syn otechestva (Son of the Fatherland). He also served with the Bureau of Censorship and, in 1825, became a member of the Imperial Society for the Encouragement of the Arts.

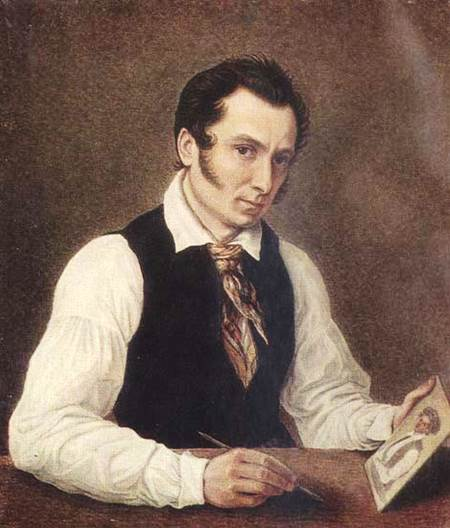
Self-portrait (1838); holding portrait of his brother, Mikhail (below)

These achievements were short-lived, however. Since 1824, he had been a member of the "Northern Society", a secret organization headed by Kondraty Ryleyev, and had written a "Manifesto to the Russian People". Following the Decembrist riot on Peter's Square, during which he led a unit of rebellious Naval Equipage of the Guard, he went into hiding but was found and arrested. He was taken to the Peter and Paul Fortress and, on 10 July 1826, was convicted of engaging in subversive activities and mutiny. He was sentenced to katorga (hard labor) for life.

=== In Siberia ===
The following month, he and his brother Mikhail were taken to Shlisselburg Fortress. In September 1827, they were transferred to Siberia and placed in a special prison at the confluence of the Chita and Ingoda rivers. In 1830, they were moved again, into the town of Petrovsk-Zabaykalsky. In 1832, their sentences were reduced to fifteen years. Shortly after, Nikolay Bestuzhev entered into a common-law marriage and fathered two children, one of whom, Alexey Startsev (1838-1900), became a major figure in the commercial trade between Russia and China. The year 1839 found Nikolay Bestuzhev and his brother Mikhail transferred to Novoselenginsk (in Buryatia), where Nikolay chose to remain, dying there in 1855.

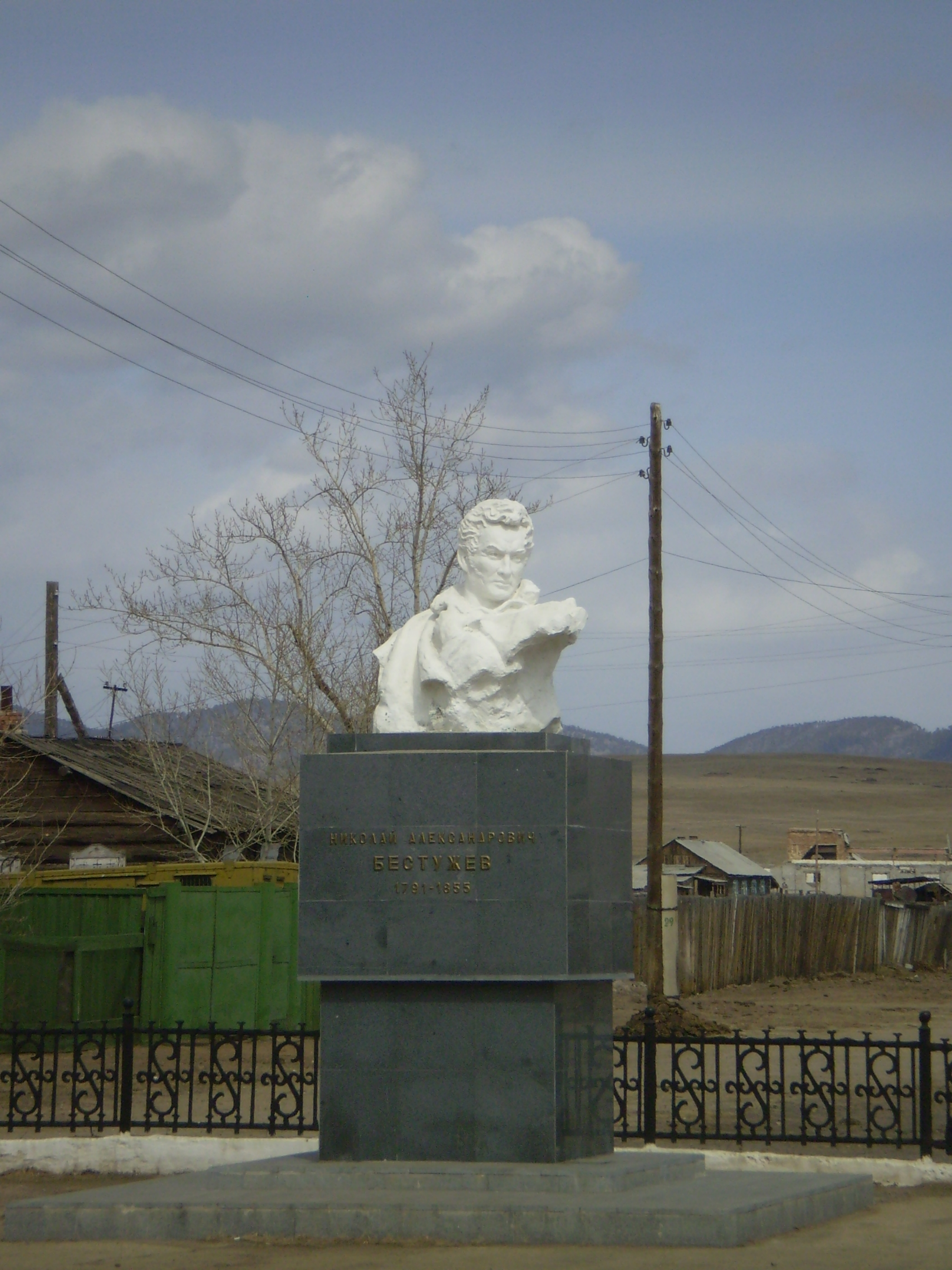
Monument to Nikolay Bestuzhev in Novoselenginsk

Despite the harsh conditions, Bestuzhev painted numerous portraits of his fellow Decembrists, the family members who had followed them to Siberia and local villagers; at first in watercolors, later in oils. At the end of his term, he spent 1841 in Irkutsk, producing portraits of government officials.

He was also engaged as a cobbler, lathe-operator and watchmaker. In that capacity, he developed a design for a high-precision chronometer based on a "new system" which he never revealed. During the Crimean War of 1853 to 1856, he designed a gun lock. He also made meteorological and astronomical observations, created an irrigation system, bred sheep, found a new coal-deposit and collected Buryat folk-tales.

In 1973, playwright Semyon Metelitsa wrote a drama about Bestuzhev called Гражданин России (A Citizen of Russia). The 1990 feature-length film, Нет чужой земли (No Foreign Land) is based on the Bestuzhevs' life in Siberia. Directed by Baras Khalzanov, it stars Pyotr Yurchenkov as Nikolay Bestuzhev.

== Available writings ==
- Mark Azadovsky (ed.), Воспоминания Бестужевых (memoirs), "Literary Monuments" series, USSR Academy of Sciences, 1951, reissued 2005 (896 pgs.) ISBN 5-02-026370-2
- S. F. Koval (ed.), Сочинения и письма, (writings and letters), Decembrist Memorial Museum, Irkutsk, 2003
- Bayr Dugarov (ed.), Гусиное озеро: статьи, очерк (Goose Lake; ethnographic writings), Buryat Publishing House, 1991
- Опыт истории Российского флота (History of the Russian Navy), Admiral Makarov National University of Shipbuilding, 1961

== Selected portraits ==
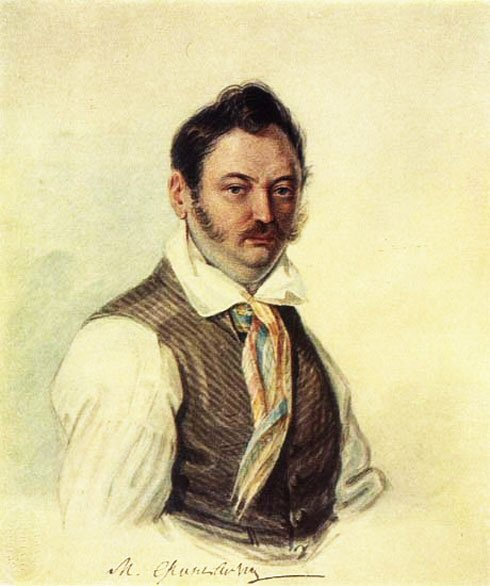
Mikhail Fonvizin

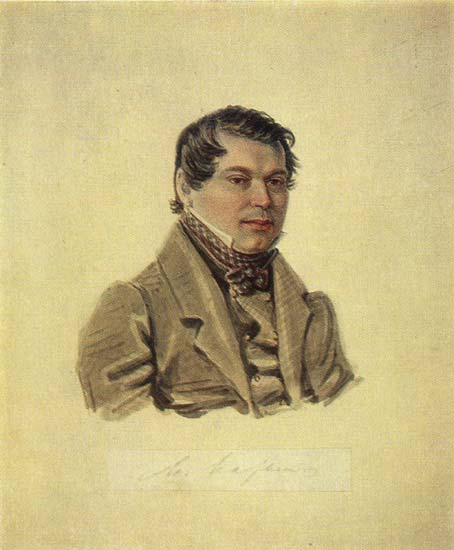
Mikhail Naryshkin

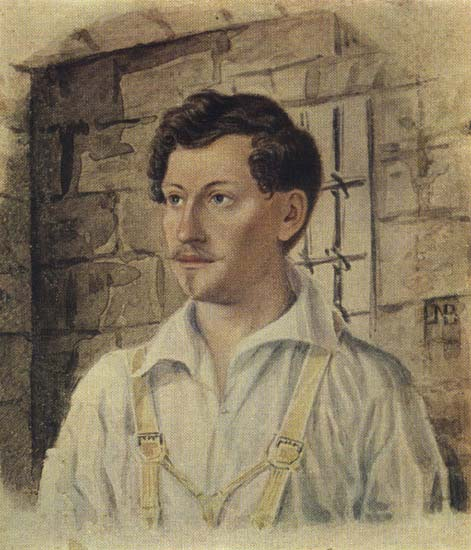
Ivan Annenkov

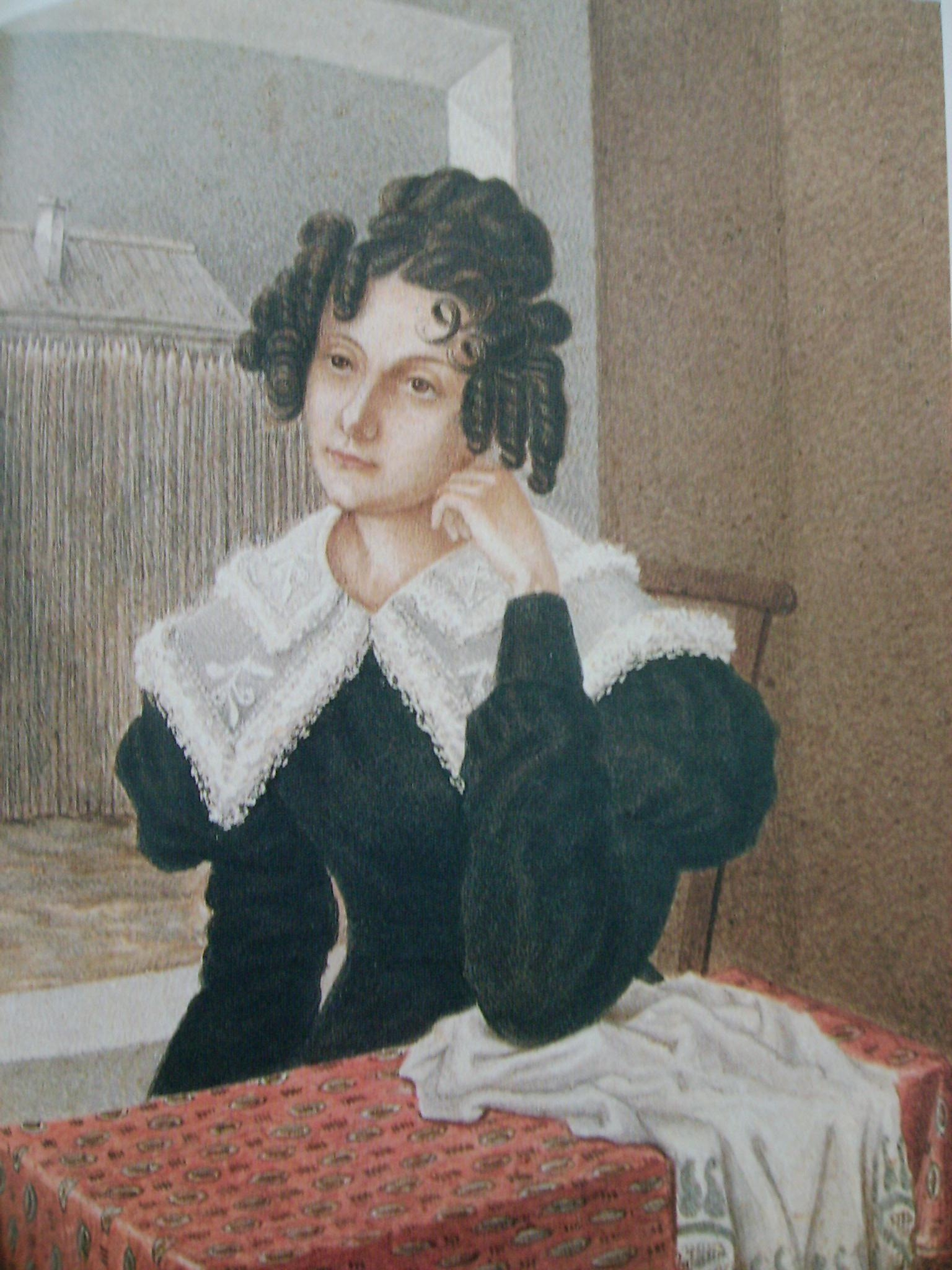
Mariya Volkonskaya

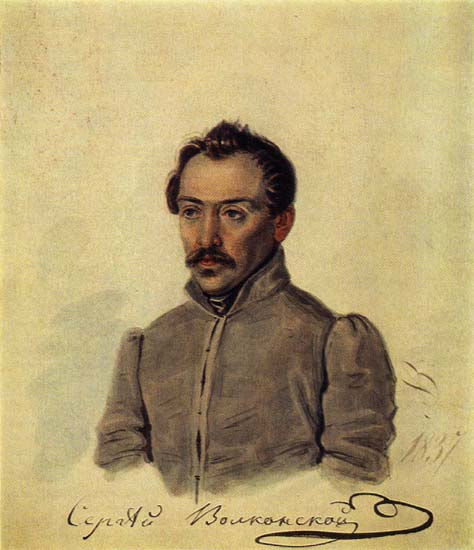
Sergei Volkonsky
