= Mikhail Fonvizin =

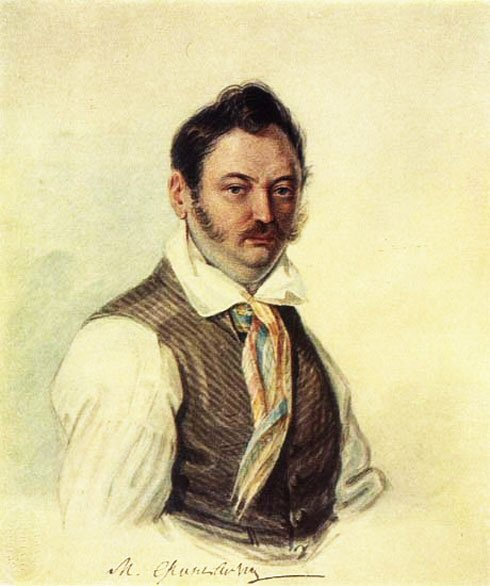
Mikhail Fonvizin; by Nikolay Bestuzhev (1832)

Mikhail Alexandrovich Fonvizin (Russian: Михаил Александрович Фонвизин; 31 August 1787, Bronnitsky Uyezd — 12 May 1854, Bronnitsky Uyezd) was a Russian Major-General, Saint-Simonist, Decembrist, and writer.

== Biography ==
He was born near the small village of Maryno, to Podpolkovnik (Lieutenant-Colonel) Alexander Ivanovich Fonvizin (1749—1819) and his wife, Ekaterina (1750—1823). Denis Fonvizin, the noted playwright and author, was his uncle. After tutoring at home, he attended Saint Peter's School in Saint Petersburg, then lived at a boarding school in Moscow, while attending lectures at Moscow University. In 1801, he entered military service in the Preobrazhensky Life Guards Regiment.

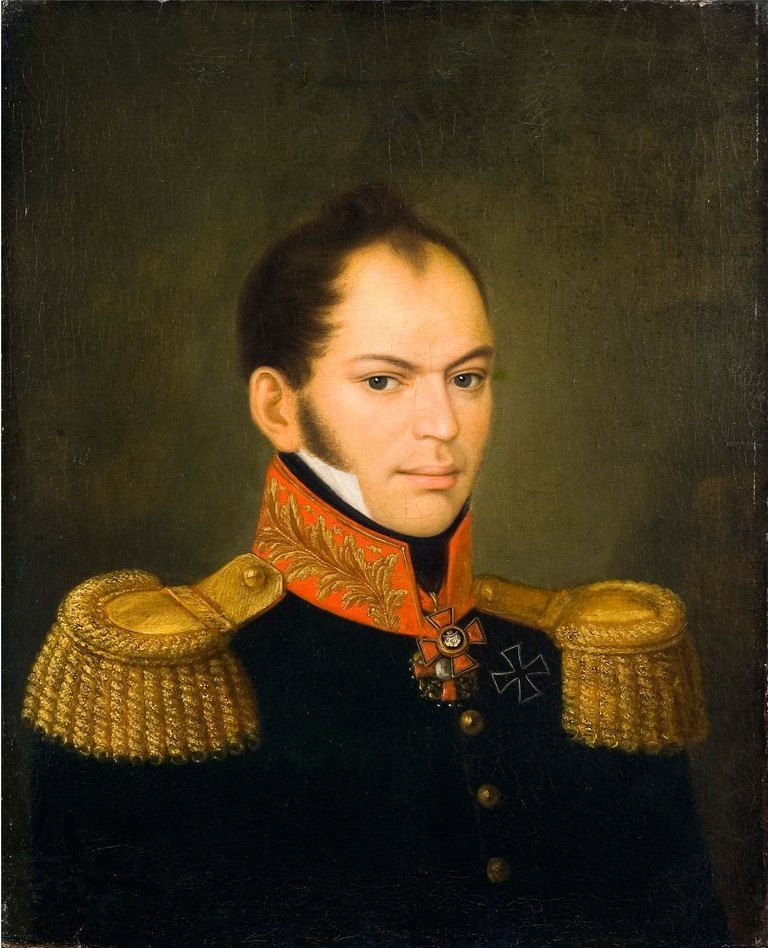
Fonvizin as an officer, by an unknown artist (1820)

His military career was distinguished. He participated in the Finnish War and a series of battles during the French invasion of Russia, then was in France during the Hundred Days. He was briefly a wounded prisoner. Several units were under his command, and he received numerous awards, including the Order of Saint Vladimir and the Kulm Cross, from the Kingdom of Prussia. By 1814, he was a Polkovnik (Colonel). In 1816, he joined the first Decembrist organization; the Union of Salvation then, when it was dissolved, the Union of Prosperity. Shortly after, when he was appointed commander of a Jaeger regiment, one of his first acts was the abolition of corporal punishment. He retired and was discharged in 1822, with the rank of Major-General. That same year, he married Natalya Apukhtina, eighteen years his junior, the only surviving child of Captain Dmitry Apukhtin (1768-1838) and his wife Mariya née Fonvizina (1779-1842), one of Mikhail's cousins. He also retired from active work in secret organizations.

When the Decembrist uprising was being planned, in 1825, he changed his mind and became involved in the process; preparing the program and charter for the Northern Society. In January 1826, he was arrested at his estate, a few miles north of Moscow, and taken to Saint Petersburg, where he was placed in the Peter and Paul Fortress. He was then sentenced to eight years of hard labor, and sent to Siberia in 1827. Natalya placed their two children in the care of relatives and followed him there.

Initially, he was kept at the prison in Chita then, in 1830, was taken to do manual labor in Petrovsk-Zabaykalsky. There, he was allowed to participate in the activities of the "Convict Academy". Natalya had two more children during this time, but both died as toddlers. In 1834, he was transferred again; to Yeniseysk. In 1835, he received permission to live in Krasnoyarsk. Two years later, he and Natalya moved once more, to Tobolsk, where their children joined them. They both died, and Natalya began raising foster children. During the cholera epidemic there, in 1848, he and other former Decembrists tended to the sick; supplying them with food and medicine. He also assisted Ivan Yakushkin, one of the movement's founders, in his efforts to establish schools based on the Lancasterian System.

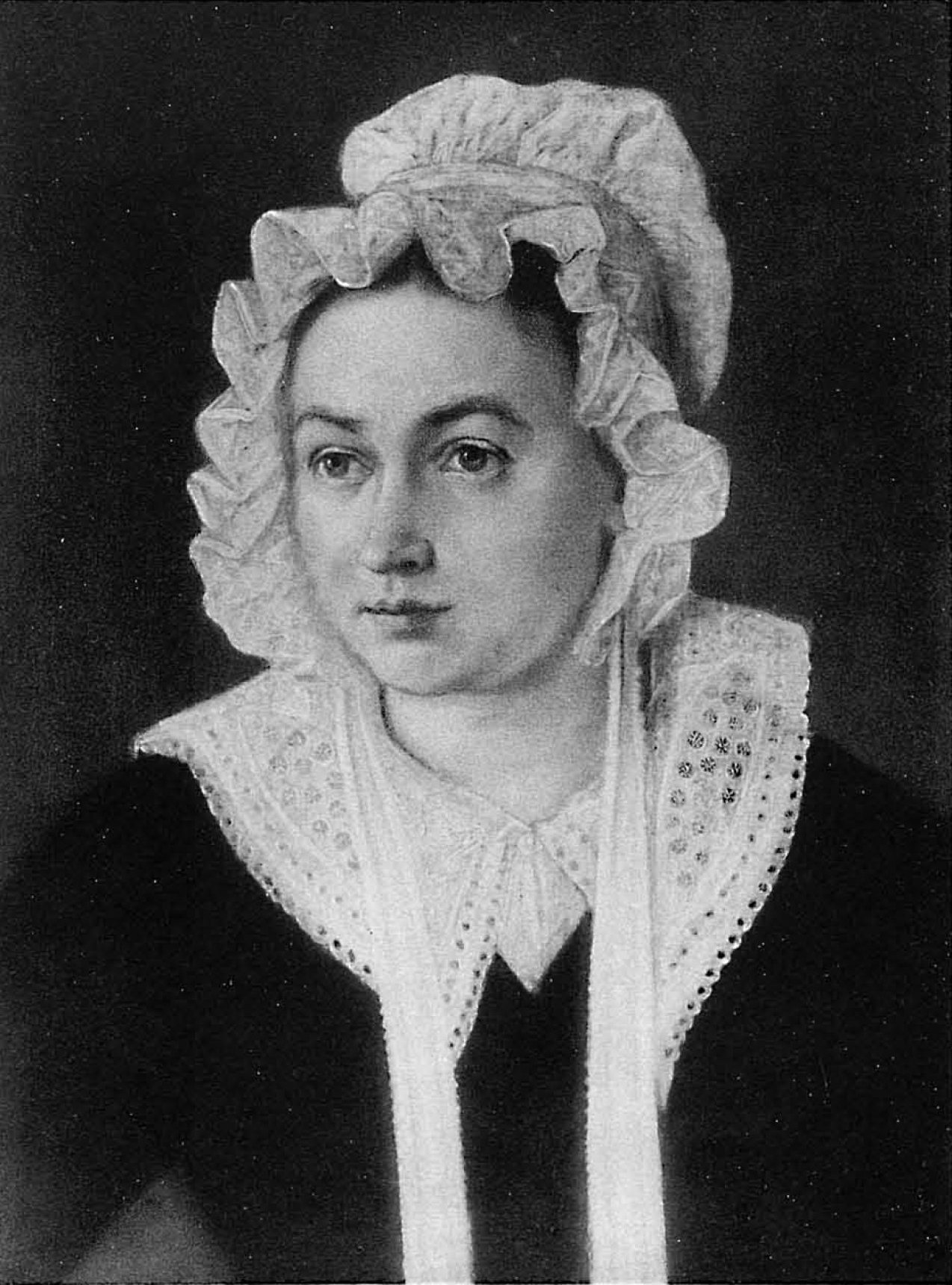
His wife, Natalya (mid-1820s)

In his later years, he turned to writing; producing tracts and essays such as Review of the Manifestations of Political Life in Russia, On Communism and Socialism, and On the Serfdom of Farmers in Russia. In April 1853, he was allowed to return to his homeland, where he lived on his brother's estate, under strict police supervision. He was prohibited from entering Moscow or Saint Petersburg. A year later, he died there, and was interred at the local cathedral. Natalya remarried in 1857, to another Decembrist, Ivan Pushchin.

== Sources ==
- Detailed biography by Zhitomirskaya and Mironenko // Our Ancestry
- Alexander Zamaleyev, М. А. Фонвизин, Мысль, 1976 (Online)
- Фонвизин М. А., Сочинения и письма (works and letters, 2 vols.). East Siberian Book Publishing House, Irkutsk, 1979—1982
