= Dunay, Primorsky Krai =

Dunay Дунай
- Urban-type settlement
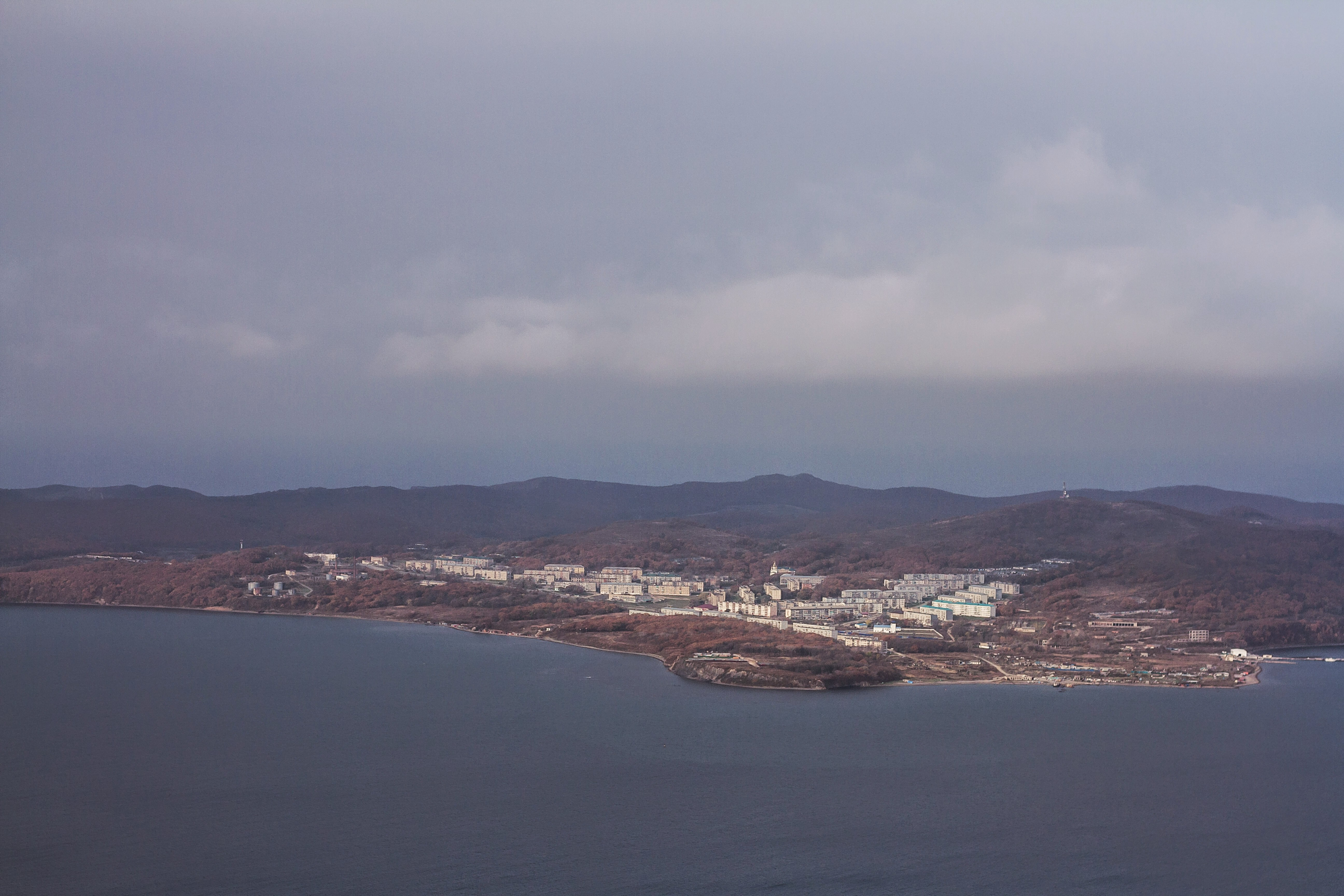
- View of Dunay in 2014
- Interactive map of Dunay
- Location of Dunay Dunay (Primorsky Krai)
- Coordinates: 42°52′49″N 132°20′15″E
- Country: Russia
- Federal subject: Primorsky Krai
- Founded: 1907
- Elevation: 29 m (95 ft)

Population (2010 Census)
  - Total: 7,581
  - Estimate (2023): 6,959 (−8.2%)

Administrative status
  - Subordinated to: Fokino Town Under Krai Jurisdiction

Municipal status
  - Urban okrug: Fokino Urban Okrug
- Time zone: UTC+10 (MSK+7)
- Postal codes: 692890, 692891
- OKTMO ID: 05747000056

Dunay (Russian: Дунай, IPA: [dʊˈnaj]) is an urban locality (an urban-type settlement) under the administrative jurisdiction of the closed town of Fokino, Primorsky Krai, Russia, located on the coast of the Gulf of Peter the Great. The population of 7,581 (2010 census); 8,599 (2002 census) once serviced a Soviet submarine base at the seaport here.

== History ==
It was formed in 1907 when several families from what is now Moldova arrived at the maritime village of Petrovka. However, these families were not accepted at Petrovka and were advised to move to a small Korean settlement at the bay of Konyushkov. The advice was taken, and the first clay huts were built by these families in a location that is now home to a railroad station. According to the recollections of those who have been living there for a long time, the village of Dunay received its name because when the first settlers saw a small but deep river after arriving at the bay of Konyushkov, they said "We left one big Dunay and arrived at another small one." The word Dunay in Russian refers to the Danube River.

During the first year the settlers did not manage to grow anything as the month of July was already ending, and for an entire year they had to rely on what the nearby Korean farmers were selling. The settlers began to grow soy, wheat, beans, and corn during the spring of the following year. During the fall, the wheat was ground at a private mill, but it turned out to be too bitter to be eaten—a result of the fog and humidity in the region. Due to this incident, the settlers did not continue to grow wheat, and to this day wheat is not grown in this region. The settlers eventually moved to the sea and caught fish, trawled chilim (a type of shrimp), and gathered scallops, mussels, and sea cucumbers from the bottom of the sea. These goods were shipped to Vladivostok on sailboats to be sent to restaurants and bazaars, and the settlers received in exchange sugar, salt, matches, and other materials.

During the Civil War, a partisan detachment headed by Fyodor Usaty fought on the territory of the settlement. This group defended the island of Putyatin from attacks by the Whites and by Japanese interventionists.

In 1929, a fishing guild was established at the bay of Konyushkov. Herring, flounder, and perch were caught at the guild as well as salmon during the fall. The fish were salted and then sent to Vladivostok.

In 1934, a diving facility was established on the coast. Crabs, scallops, mussels, and sea cucumbers were gathered. Production was developed at a fish factory located in this region. Everything that was produced was sent to be exported across the border.

In 1937, a railroad linked the settlement of Dunay with the settlement of Smolyaninovo; however, it was not until 1940 when the first passenger train traveled between the two settlements.

The town of Dunay near Chazhma Bay is one of many places on the peninsula where people are suffering from the effects of the contamination from the nuclear submarine accident of 10 August 1985, and years of nuclear waste dumping.

== Facilities ==
The settlement has two high schools. The historical part of the settlement, known as Stary Dunay, is home to dachas for local villagers.

In the early 21st century the main business in the area was ship repair, in the Port of Dunay. The port came to attention in early 2024 because it was the terminus for shipments of North Korean arms from the Port of Najin destined for the Russian invasion of Ukraine.
