= Putyatin Island =

Island in Primorsky Krai, Russia

Coordinates: 42°50′N 132°25′E

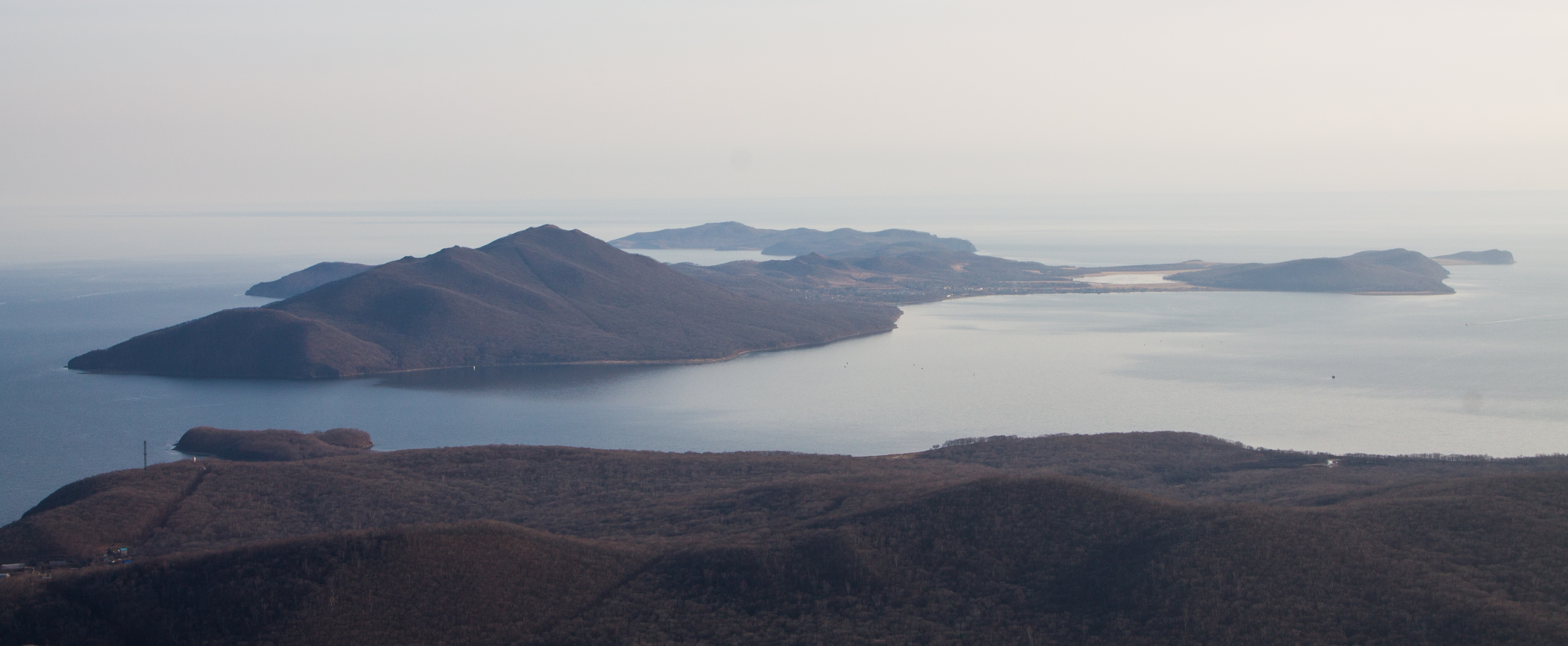
Putyatin Island

Putyatin Island (Russian: Остров Путятина) is an island in Strelok Bay (east part of Peter the Great Gulf), near 50 kilometres (31 mi) east of Vladivostok and 35 kilometres (22 mi) west of Nakhodka. The island is named after Admiral Yevfimy Putyatin and is under the Fokino city administration.

The area of the island is 27.9 square kilometres (10.8 sq mi); the highest point is Startsev Mount, with an elevation of 353 metres (1,158 ft).

The island's population is 994 (2010). There is only one settlement on the island. Putyatin Island is one of four inhabited islands of Primorsky Krai (the other three are Russky, Popov and Reyneke).

The main branches of economy of the island are fish-processing and tourism. The Island is separated from continental Primorye by a strait, which is 1.5 kilometres (0.93 mi) in width.
