= Promyslovka =

Promyslovka Промысловка
- Selo
- Location within Astrakhan Oblast Location within Russia
- Coordinates: 45°43′N 47°09′E
- Country: Russia
- Region: Astrakhan Oblast
- District: Limansky District
- Time zone: UTC+4:00

Promyslovka (Russian: Промысловка) is a rural locality (a selo) and the administrative center of Promyslovsky Selsoviet, Limansky District, Astrakhan Oblast, Russia. The population was 1,453 as of 2010. There are 10 streets.

== Geography ==
Promyslovka is located 8 km southwest of Liman (the district's administrative centre) by road. Yandyki is the nearest rural locality.
