= Ivan Yakushkin =

Ivan Dmitrievich Yakushkin
- Иван Дмитриевич Якушкин
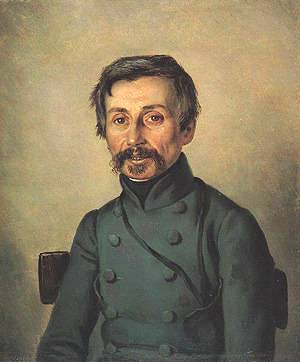
- Ivan Yakushkin; by Carl Peter Mazér (1851)
- Born: January 9, 1793; Safonovsky District, Russian Empire
- Died: August 23, 1857 (aged 64); Moscow, Russian Empire
- Occupations: Military officer, educator

Ivan Dmitrievich Yakushkin (Russian:Иван Дмитриевич Якушкин; 9 January 1793, Safonovsky District - 23 August 1857, Moscow) was a Russian military officer, Decembrist, and educator.

== Biography ==
He was born into a noble family, dating from the 15th century. His father, Dmitri Andreyevich Yakushkin († 1826), was a major landowner. From 1808 to 1811, he attended Moscow University, where he studied literature with Aleksey Merzlyakov, and history with Mikhail Kachenovsky. After graduating, he enlisted as a Podpraporshchik (Ensign) in the Semyonovsky Life Guards Regiment and participated in numerous actions during the Napoleonic Wars, for which he was awarded the Orders of St. George and of Saint Anna and the Kulm Cross. His time spent outside Russia had a strong influence on his political opinions.

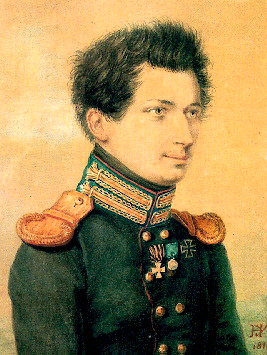
Yakushkin as a young officer, by Nikolai Utkin (1816)

In 1816, he joined with Prince Sergei Petrovich Trubetskoy and several of his fellow officers to create a secret organization known as the Union of Salvation; a precursor to what would later be called the Decembrist movement. They were motivated by the mistreatment of soldiers and their opposition to serfdom, with the ultimate goal of creating a representative government. Later that year, when it appeared that Russia would go to war with the Turks, he requested a transfer to a unit in Chernigov Governorate that was under the command of his friend, Mikhail Fonvizin, who he persuaded to become a member. When the unit was brought back to Moscow, he expressed disagreement with the Union's charter, written in his absence, citing the blind obedience required, and helped to write a new one, based on the German Tugendbund.

Following a rumor that Tsar Alexander I was planning to move the capital to Warsaw, it was suggested that his reign should be brought to an end. Yakushkin volunteered to be the assassin. When they changed their minds, he persisted and was criticized for putting the Union in danger. He abandoned his plans, but also resigned. Shortly after, he retired from the military and returned to his family estates, where he began to act on some of the proposed reforms; eventually deciding to free his serfs entirely. Much to his surprise, they chose to maintain the status quo; although this may have been due to pressure from the Ministry of the Interior, which he had informed of his intentions. He later came to believe that simply setting them free would not be a practical solution.

During this time, he joined the Union of Prosperity, the Union of Salvation's successor. Once again, he became involved in controversies, concerning the Union's activities. When it was disbanded, in 1821, he turned his attention to a famine in Smolensk Governorate. Near the end of 1822, he married Anastasia Sheremeteva, who was fourteen years his junior. They went to live with her mother, in a secluded village, having heard that the Tsar had become aware of a secret society. In 1825, upon hearing of the Tsar's death, he went to Moscow, where he participated in meetings of the Northern Society. When a letter from Ivan Pushchin arrived, describing the situation in Saint Petersburg, Yakushkin invited his friends to incite the troops in Moscow to stage a rebellion. He was arrested in January 1826, after refusing to swear an oath of allegiance to the new Tsar, Nicholas I.

=== After the uprising ===
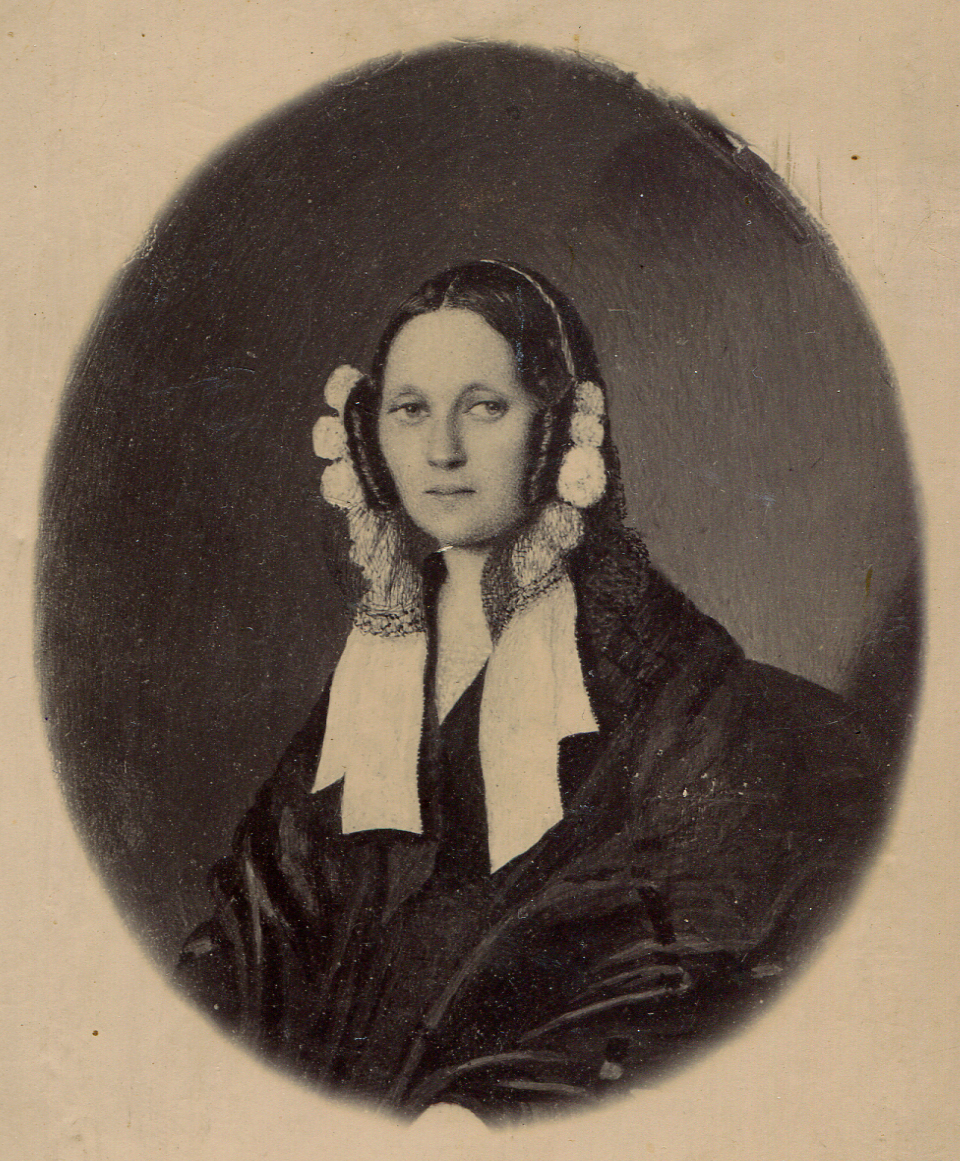
His wife, Anastasia, from a miniature by an unknown artist (1830s)

A few days later, he was interrogated and learned that the government was aware of his offer to assassinate Alexander. Despite threats of torture, he refused to name his associates. By order of the Tsar, he was chained hand and foot, then placed in Peter and Paul Fortress. For two weeks, he subsisted on bread and water. Another interrogation followed, but he still refused. Near the end of February, he finally relented and swore to give a true account of everything. In April, the Tsar ordered his shackles removed. In May, he was allowed to meet with his mother-in-law and, in June, after Anastasia sent a petition to the Tsar, she was allowed to visit him with their two sons. In August, he was sentenced to fifteen years at hard labor, although it was November 1827 before he was sent to Siberia. His family was able to see him off in Yaroslavl. Anastasia had originally planned to go with him but was dissuaded when she learned that their children could not go along.

He was one of about sixty Decembrists taken to Chita. In 1828, after numerous petitions, Anastasia was allowed to join him with their children, on the condition she be officially advised that there was no place to raise them. Once again, she chose not to go. In 1830, he was moved to Petrovsk-Zabaykalsky, where he was able to study botany and compile a geography textbook. In 1832, Anastasia made another attempt to join him, but was denied on the grounds that she had already been given two chances, and that her children needed her. She made one final attempt, requesting that they be accepted into the Page Corps, so they could be enrolled at the Tsarskoye Selo Lyceum. After much negotiation, this was granted, but Yakushkin himself rejected the favor, officially declaring they had no right to it, but conveying to Anastasia his concern about what might happen if she and the children were separated. They were finally reunited in 1835, when he was released from hard labor, and taken to Yalutorovsk for permanent settlement.

In 1839, together with Stepan Znamensky, a local priest, he began organizing a school for peasant boys. It opened in 1842, despite opposition from the local school superintendent, who saw it as competition. It initially taught basic reading, writing and arithmetic, according to the Lancasterian System. Later, when the Tobolsk Seminary became interested, courses in sacred history, Greek, Latin and the catechism were added. By 1856, the school could claim approximately 530 graduates. Anastasia died in 1846, after a short illness, aged only thirty-nine. In her memory, he decided to start a girls' school as well. Local merchants helped with the school's construction, and it opened in 1850. By 1856, over 240 pupils had studied there. After his death, both schools were taken under the jurisdiction of the Ministry of Education.

He went through a period of severe illness in 1854, during which he was allowed to visit mineral springs near Lake Baikal. When he felt better, he went to visit his old friend, Prince Trubetskoy, in Irkutsk. There, he became ill again; being diagnosed with scurvy, skin ulcers, rheumatism, hemorrhoids and general fatigue. He would remain in Irkutsk until 1856, when an Imperial manifesto freed the Decembrists from exile, although they were forbidden to enter any major cities. Upon returning home, he failed to improve, so his sons contacted Prince Vasily Dolgorukov, a high official in the Chancellery, and asked him to seek permission for their father to receive medical treatment in Moscow. This passed through several officials, reaching Tsar Alexander II, who approved, as many Decembrists were making the same request. After moving about, and passing through some bureaucratic hurdles, he died there in 1857.

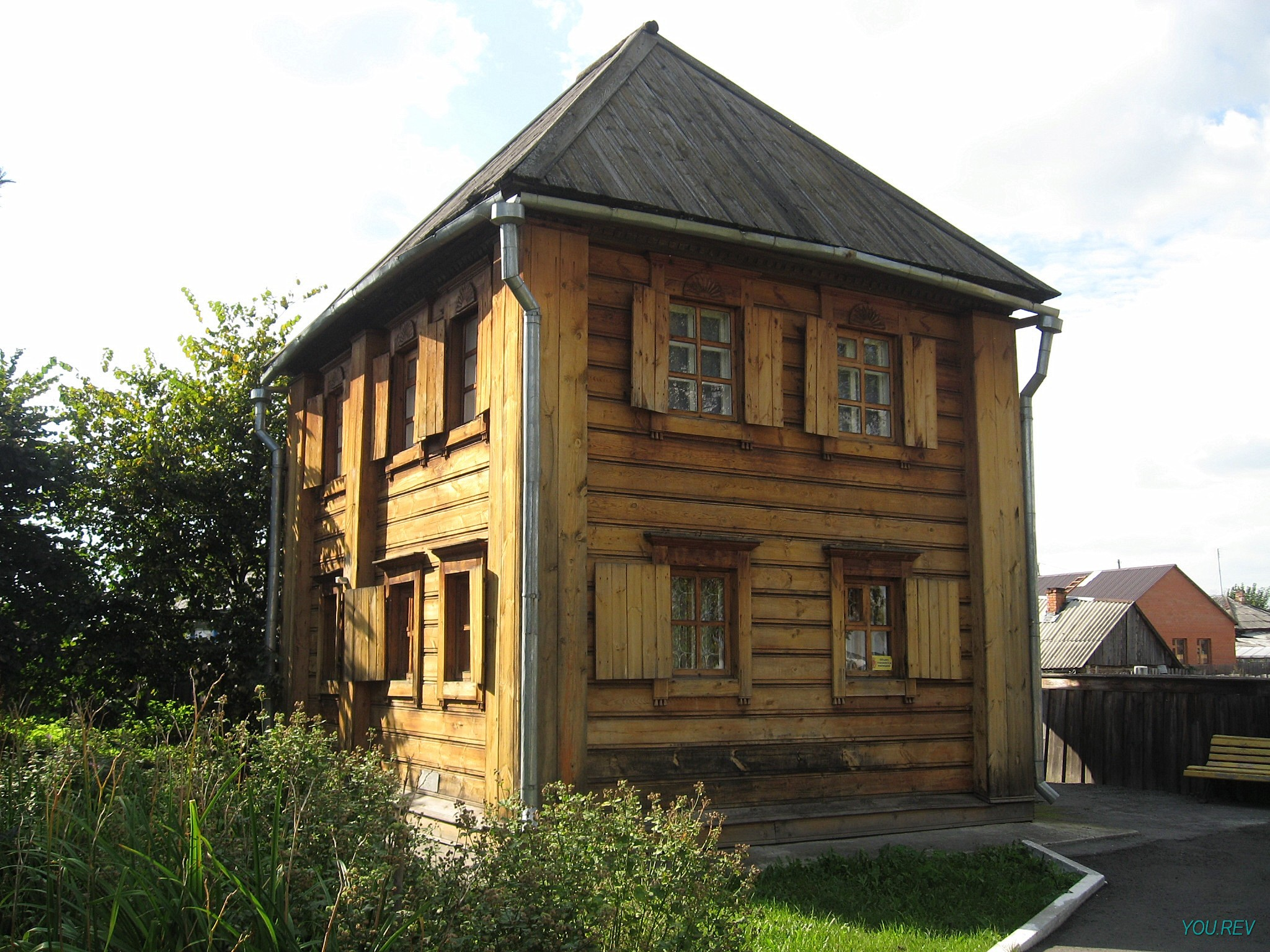
Yakushkin's home in Yalutorovsk; now a museum
