= Gankhüügiin Pürevbat =

Mongolian painter and art collector (1965–2024)

Baatarkhuyagiin Pürevbat (Mongolian: Баатархуяг Пүрэвбат; 1965–2024) was a Mongolian painter, art collector, museum director and Buddhist teacher in the Vajrayana School. Lam Pürevbat was the founder of the Zanabazar Mongolian Institute of Buddhist Art. He was born in 1965 in Bornuur in the Töv Province.

== Biography ==
Pürevbat studied traditional Mongolian art at the National Art and Culture College in Ulaanbaatar. When he realized that the history of traditional thangka paintings originates in Tibetan Buddhism, he decided to become a Buddhist monk. Then he found two Mongolian connoisseurs of arts, the Damjiang Lama and the Dorje Zanchung Lama, who introduced him into this tradition. In order to deepen his skills, he went for a study tour to Sanggye Yeshe, the official thangka painter of the Fourteenth Dalai Lama, and Geshe Samten, a master in the making of mandalas. In this time he traveled extensively through the Himalayas, where he met great Tibetan masters in Nepal, Bhutan and Sikkim. During his tour he collected source material and he acquainted himself intensively in Tibetan Buddhist iconography and econometrics. In fact, he followed the same tradition as one great Mongol artist and Buddhist clergyman had done so several centuries earlier, and to who bears now the name of his institute, to know Zanabazar. Artistically, Pürevbat was known for his conformity and his perseverance to essential authentic rules. Next to that, he was a great renewer as well, who has added modern disciplines and practices to his creations. His style, therefore, has been called dynamic and distinctive.

Around 2008 Pürevbat worked on a publication of 23 volumes about art history and techniques. His work overall has led to a revival of activities and the spreading of art and culture in Mongolia.

Pürevbat died on 10 April 2024, at the age of 59.

== Zanabazar Mongolian Institute ==
The Zanabazar Mongolian Institute of Buddhist Art is a part of the Gandantegchinlen Monastery in Ulaanbaatar. The monastery was destroyed in 1937 by the communists, as happened to around 1,000 other monasteries in that era as well. Pürevbat decided that the monastery had to be rebuilt again, in which he succeeded in the course of years with the help of his disciples.

With the Zanabazar Mongolian Institute Pürevbat regularly organized exhibitions on painting, sculpture, appliqué, architecture and dance. He also founded a school to educate artists and art teachers to educate in these professions. Furthermore, the institute documents historic places of discoveries, organizes restorations and reintroduces festivals that had vanished as a result of the 20th-century Mongolian regime's policies.

== Acknowledgement ==
In 2004 Thomas Gonschior made a 55-minute documentary film on Pürevbat and his disciples, called Buddha's Painter, A Renaissance of Mongolian Art. The documentary film was first shown at the Globians Film Festival in Berlin in 2005.

In 2008 Pürevbat was honored with a Prince Claus Award from the Netherlands, within the theme of Culture and the human body. The jury rewarded him for "the rigorous authenticity of his methods and techniques, for re-establishing an important ‘un-modern’ aesthetic practice, for his dedication and generosity in fostering future generations, and for nurturing local identity through artistic tradition and culture."
