= Putyatin (urban-type settlement) =

Urban locality in Primorsky Krai, Russia

Coordinates: 42°51′50″N 132°24′50″E

Putyatin (Russian: Путятин) is an urban locality (an urban-type settlement) under the administrative jurisdiction of the closed town of Fokino in Primorsky Krai, Russia. Population: 887 (2010 census); 1,133 (2002 census);
