= Mikhail Miloradovich =

Russian general (1771–1825)

Count Mikhail Andreyevich Miloradovich
- Михаил Андреевич Милорадович
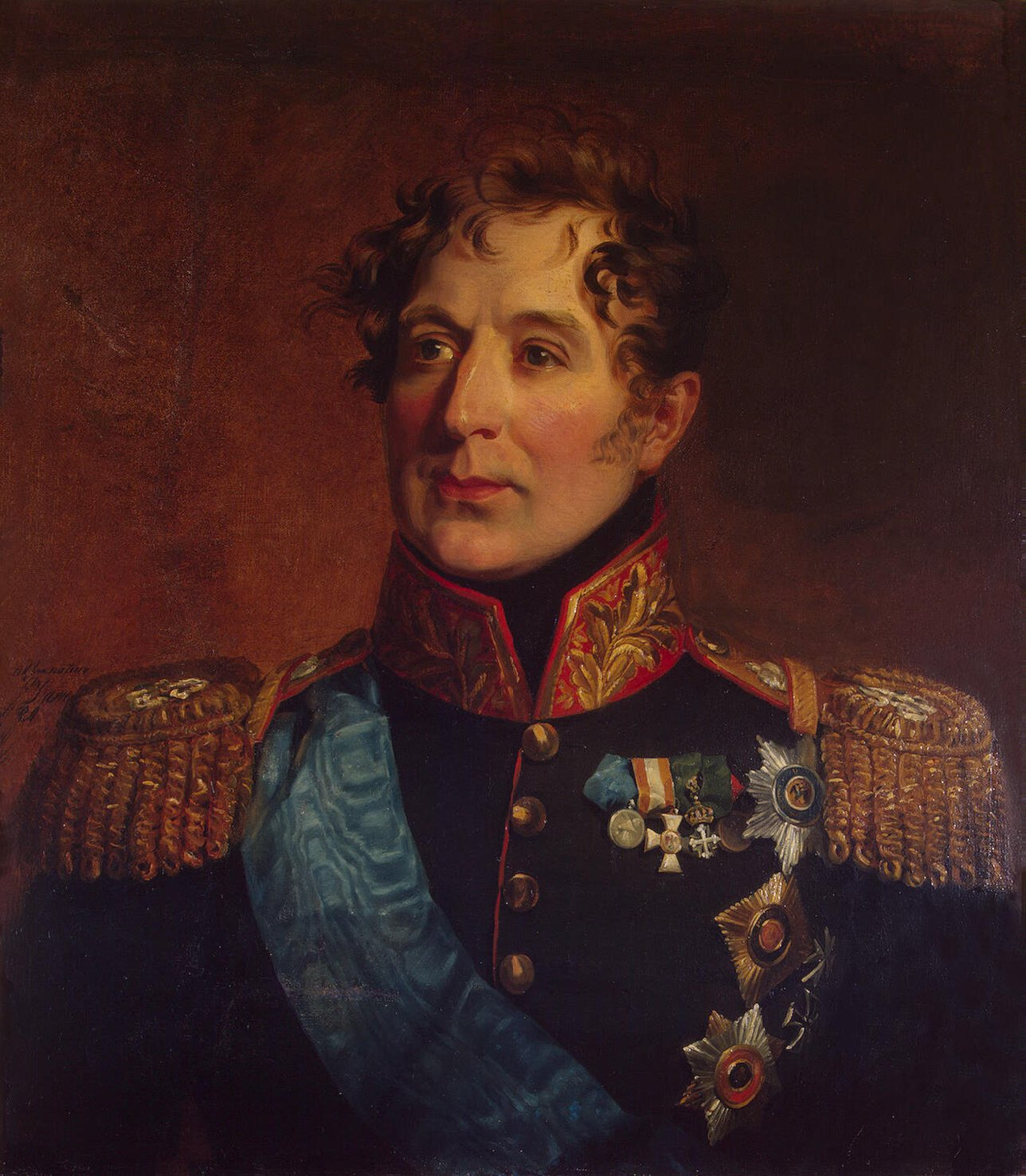
- Portrait by George Dawe, c. 1820s

Governor General of Saint Petersburg
- In office 31 August 1818 – 15 December 1825
- Preceded by: Sergey Vyazmitinov
- Succeeded by: Pavel Golenishchev-Kutuzov

Personal details
- Born: 12 October [O.S. 1 October] 1771 Poltava Governorate, Russian Empire
- Died: 27 December 1825 (aged 54) Saint Petersburg, Russian Empire
- Resting place: Annunciation Church of the Alexander Nevsky Lavra, St. Petersburg
- Education: University of Göttingen; University of Königsberg
- Nickname(s): The Russian Bayard; The Russian Murat

Military service
- Allegiance: Russian Empire
- Branch/service: Imperial Russian Army
- Years of service: 1787–1825
- Rank: General of the Infantry
- Unit: Izmailovsky Life Guards Regiment
- Commands: 81st Apsheron Infantry Regiment, Imperial Guard
- Battles/wars: List: Russo-Swedish War (1788–1790); Italian and Swiss expedition; Combat of Lecco; Battle of the Trebbia; Battle of Novi; Battle of the Gotthard Pass; Battle of Muottental; War of the Third Coalition; Battle of Amstetten; Battle of Dürenstein; Battle of Austerlitz; Russo-Turkish War (1806–1812); Battle of Turbat; Battle of Obilești; Patriotic War of 1812; Battle of Borodino; Battle of Tarutino; Battle of Maloyaroslavets; Battle of Vyazma; Battle of Krasnoi; War of the Sixth Coalition; Battle of Lützen; Battle of Bautzen; Battle of Kulm; Battle of Leipzig; Battle of Arcis-sur-Aube; Battle of Brienne; Battle of Fère-Champenoise; Decembrist Revolt †
- Awards: List: Order of St. George 2nd class, Order of St. Andrew, Order of St. Vladimir 1st class, Order of St. Anna 1st class, Order of St. John of Jerusalem, Order of St. Alexander Nevsky, Order of the Red Eagle, Order of Saints Maurice and Lazarus, Iron Cross, Golden Weapon "For Bravery" (for the taking of Bucharest, 1806)

Count Mikhail Andreyevich Miloradovich (Russian: Граф Михаил Андреевич Милорадович, Serbian: Гроф Михаил Андрејевић Милорадовић, Serbo-Croatian: Grof Mihail Andrejević Miloradović; 12 October [O.S. 1 October] 1771 – 27 December [O.S. 15 December] 1825), spelled Miloradovitch in contemporary English sources, was a Russian general prominent during the Napoleonic Wars. On his father's side, Miloradovich descended from Serb noble family and the katun clan of Miloradović from Hum, later part of Sanjak of Herzegovina, in present-day Bosnia and Herzegovina. He entered military service on the eve of the Russo-Swedish War of 1788–1790 and his career advanced rapidly during the reign (1796–1801) of Emperor Paul I. He served under Alexander Suvorov during Italian and Swiss campaigns of 1799. Miloradovich was, along with Mikhail Kutuzov and Pyotr Bagration, a brilliant pupil of Suvorov, and became one of the outstanding figures in the military history of Russia.

Miloradovich served in wars against France and the Ottoman Empire, earning distinction in the Battle of Amstetten (1805), the capture of Bucharest (1806), the Battle of Borodino (September 1812), the Battle of Tarutino (October 1812), the Battle of Vyazma, and the Battle of Krasnoi (November 1812). He led the reserves into the Battle of Kulm (August 1813), the Battle of Leipzig (October 1813) and the Battle of Paris (1814). Miloradovich attained the rank of General of the Infantry in 1809 and the title of count in 1813. His reputation as a daring battlefield commander (contemporaries called him "the Russian Murat" and "the Russian Bayard") rivalled that of his bitter personal enemy Bagration, but Miloradovich also had a reputation for good luck. He boasted that he had fought fifty battles but had never been wounded nor even scratched by the enemy.

By 1818, when Miloradovich was appointed Governor General of Saint Petersburg, the retirement or death of other senior generals made him the most highly-decorated active officer of the Russian army, holding the Order of St. George 2nd class, the Order of St. Andrew, the Order of St. Vladimir 1st class, the Order of St. Anna 1st class, the Order of St. John of Jerusalem and the Order of St. Alexander Nevsky with diamonds. A chivalrous man of boastful and flamboyant character, Miloradovich was a poor fit for the governorship. Vladimir Nabokov called him "a gallant soldier, bon vivant and a somewhat bizarre administrator"; Alexander Herzen wrote that he was "one of those military men who occupied the most senior positions in civilian life with not the slightest idea about public affairs".

When news of the death of Alexander I reached Saint Petersburg, Miloradovich prevented the heir, the future Emperor Nicholas I, from acceding to the throne. From December 9 [O.S. November 27] to 25 December [O.S. 13 December] 1825, Miloradovich exercised de facto dictatorial authority, but he ultimately recognised Nicholas as his sovereign after the Romanovs had sorted out their confusion over the succession. Miloradovich had sufficient evidence of the mounting Decembrist revolt, but did not take any action until the rebels took over the Senate Square on 26 December [O.S. 14 December] 1825. He rode into the rows of rebel troops and tried to talk them into obedience, but was fatally shot by Pyotr Kakhovsky and stabbed by Yevgeny Obolensky.

== Early years ==
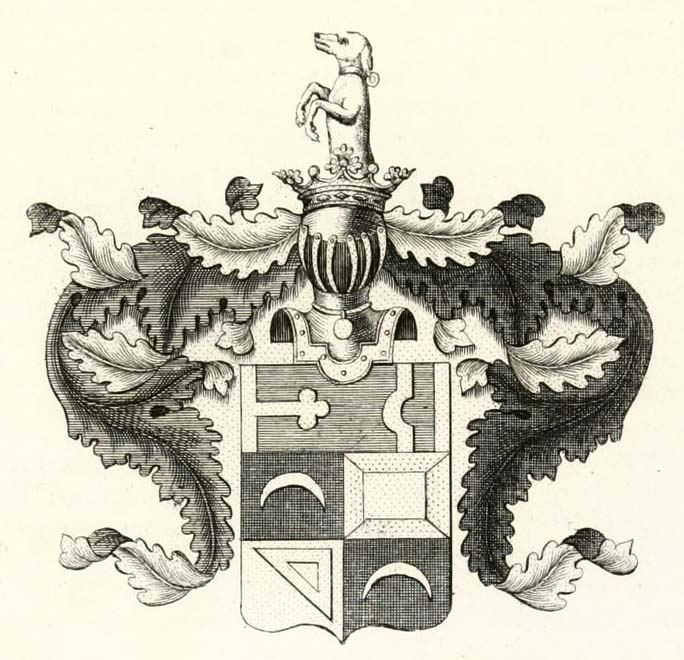
Coat of arms of Miloradovich family

Mikhail Miloradovich was the son of Major General Andrei Miloradovich (1726–1798). The Miloradovichs descended from an Eastern Orthodox Serb Vlach noble family and a katun clan from Hum, in present-day Bosnia and Herzegovina, where they rose to a station of prominent Bosnian Ottoman nobility of Sanjak of Herzegovina. The Russian branch of the Miloradovich family was established in 1715, when Mikhail I Miloradovich (the first) (Serbian Cyrillic: Михаило Милорадовић), one of three brothers recruited by Peter I to incite rebellion against the Turks four years earlier, fled from Herzegovina to Russia and joined Peter's service as a colonel. He was a commander of the Hadiach Regiment. Towards the end of Peter's reign he was imprisoned in connection with Pavlo Polubotok's treason case, but was spared from further misfortune by Peter's death. His grandson Andrey served thirty years in the Russian Army and later moved into civil administration as the Governor of Little Russia and the Chernigov governorate. The family owned lands in the Poltava Governorate; Mikhail inherited up to fifteen hundred serfs.

Mikhail's father "enrolled" him in the military in his infancy, and later sent teenage Mikhail to study military sciences in the universities of Königsberg and Göttingen, and in Strasbourg and Metz. According to Nikolai Leskov, the education was superficial: Leskov described Mikhail as a boy of "charming ignorance" who did not even master the French language properly, and said that his French was littered with the "most grave and curious mistakes" (an anecdote credited him with blending pittoresque and synagogue into "pittagogue"). Sixteen-year-old Mikhail returned to Russia in 1787, joined the army as a praporshchik (a junior commissioned officer rank) in the Izmaylovsky Regiment and was soon sent into action in the Russo-Swedish War of 1788–1790.

== Military career ==
=== Italian and Swiss campaigns ===
Miloradovich did not earn any distinction in the war of 1788–1790, but he advanced rapidly in peacetime. A captain of the Guards in 1796, Paul I regarded him favorably and he was promoted to the rank of colonel in 1797 and major general and chief of the Apsheron Artillery Regiment in 1798. In the same year, he departed to join Alexander Suvorov's troops in Italy. He won Suvorov's unconditional trust for taking Lecco on the eve of the Battle of Cassano and for commanding the rearguard in the crossing of the Gotthard Pass. At Bassignana he changed three horses killed by the enemy but was not even scratched; at Altdorf he led assault infantry over a burning bridge; at Mutten on 1 October his regiment was standing ahead of the first line in skirmish order. These and similar episodes, true or anecdotal, forged public opinion of Miloradovich as a daring and lucky field commander, an opinion that he himself cultivated for the rest of his life. Miloradovich was adored at home, but the French held a different opinion: Adolphe Thiers described Miloradovich as "a Servian [sic], of brilliant valour, but absolutely destitute of military knowledge, dissolute in manners, uniting all the vices of civilization with all the vices of barbarism".

Paul rewarded Miloradovich with the Order of St. Anne 1st class, the Order of St. John of Jerusalem and the Order of St. Alexander Nevsky. Suvorov, in violation of military codes, transferred Miloradovich from field troops to his staff as a "general in waiting"; Paul later cited this fact as a pretext to dismiss Suvorov. Friendship between Miloradovich and Paul's second son Constantine also dated back to the Swiss campaign. Constantine awarded Miloradovich a gilded sword with an inscription To my friend Miloradovich, which Miloradovich had with him on the day of his death.

=== Amstetten and Austerlitz ===
Miloradovich played a key role in the Battle of Amstetten, where Mikhail Kutuzov ordered his three regiments to take a stand and provide relief for Pyotr Bagration's troops. "Above all, skillful maneuvering of the Russian force, including timely arrival of Miloradovich and his intelligent application of the reserve forces at his disposal, prevented the collapse of the rear guard". The action at Amstetten allowed Kutuzov to break contact with the French and prevented an all-out battle that would have been disastrous for the Russians. Reports of the battle by Miloradovich himself contradict the French accounts and are not corroborated by Bagration's laconic report: each side presented their own perspective, and Miloradovich had a particular penchant for glorifying his own actions. His action at Amstetten was rewarded with the Order of St. George 3rd class and promotion to lieutenant general. On November 11, 1805 Miloradovich attacked the French in the Battle of Dürenstein (referred to as the Battle of Krems in Russian sources), but the French withdrew before his corps could inflict significant damage.

The Battle of Austerlitz saw Miloradovich in charge of the Russian part of a Russian-Austrian infantry column (2,875 out of 11,795 men), one of the four columns placed on Pratzen Heights, which had been abandoned by the French. Another, a larger part of the column was under Austrian command; the close presence of Kutuzov somewhat mitigated the perils of divided command. Tsar Alexander ordered this column to move before others were deployed; Kutuzov, unable to oppose the tsar, ordered Miloradovich to advance across the Goldbach Stream to Kobylnice, disregarding enemy action and difficult terrain. Hills and fog obstructed the view, and the column marched straight into the bulk of the French armies. Soult's troops mauled the mixed column and Miloradovich retreated. Alexander summoned his brother Constantine for help (although an alternative account by Bowden and Duffy asserts that Miloradovich contacted Constantine himself). Contrary to the popular view that "he was almost the only Russian general who obtained an advantage over the French" at Austerlitz, General Karl Wilhelm von Toll contested Miloradovich's actions, asserting that his column was the first to fall back and that it was Bagration, not Miloradovich, who saved the allied troops from annihilation.

=== Russian-Turkish War ===
The war of 1806–1812 began with Russian occupation of Moldavia and Wallachia. After the Turks responded by taking Bucharest, Russian commander-in-chief Ivan Ivanovich Michelson dispatched Miloradovich to intervene. Miloradovich captured Bucharest on December 13 without significant resistance from the Turks and was rewarded with a golden sword with diamonds "For the taking of Bucharest". The Turks, manipulated by the French envoy Sébastiani, did not declare war until five days later. No large-scale action followed. In May 1807 Miloradovich tried to capture Giurgiu, but failed and fell back to Bucharest. On 2 June 1807, he redeemed himself by checking the Turkish advance at Obilești.

The years 1808 and 1809 did not see any remarkable action either, but were marked by a dual intrigue among top Russian generals; at the top level, Mikhail Kutuzov was in conflict with Alexander Prozorovsky, while below them burned a feud between Miloradovich and Pyotr Bagration. Bagration temporarily succeeded Prozorovsky as commander-in-chief, but later both Miloradovich and Bagration lost their commands. At the beginning of 1810 Alexander recalled Miloradovich from front-line duty and tasked him with assembling a new army in Belarus. In April 1810 Miloradovich was appointed Governor of Kiev but soon tended his resignation. He was officially discharged in September 1810 but was called up for service in November, again, as Governor of Kiev.

=== Napoleon's invasion of Russia ===
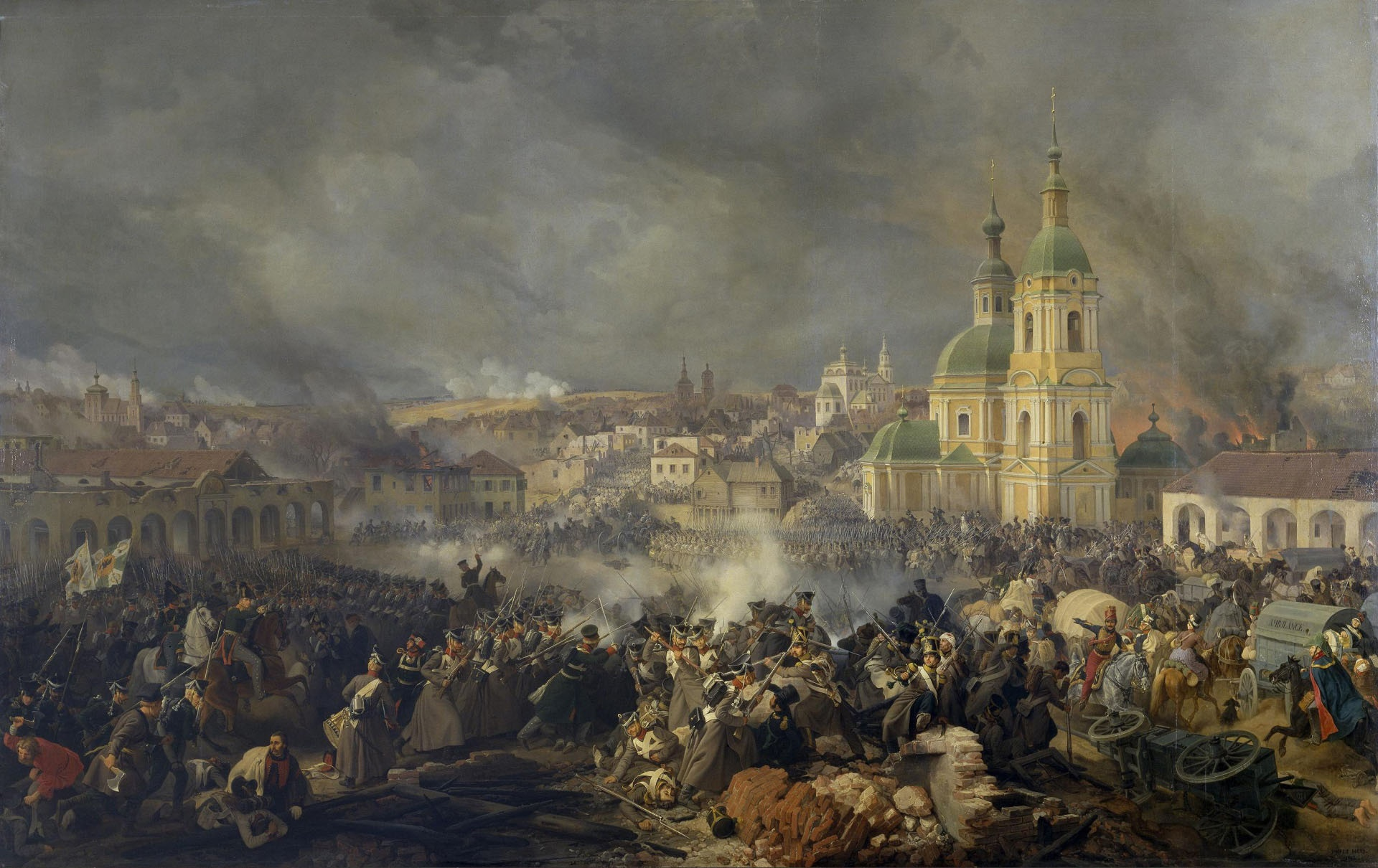
The Battle of Vyazma

At the beginning of the 1812 campaign, Miloradovich was tasked with assembling and training volunteer militia troops in the hinterland; he returned to action on the eve of the Battle of Borodino with 14,600 militiamen. Kutuzov appointed Miloradovich commander of front-line forces of the right (northern) flank, comprising Baggovut's Second Infantry Corps and Ostermann-Tolstoy's Fourth Infantry Corps. The battle plan required Miloradovich to protect the old Smolensk-Moscow road. On the day of the battle, September 7 [O.S. August 26], Kutuzov realised that enemy action was concentrated against his center and left flank and, at about 9 a.m., he ordered Miloradovich to march to the south and attack the French left flank. Riding in advance of his troops, Miloradovich was caught up in the heat of the battle for Semyonovskoe and, together with Barclay de Tolly, Yermolov and Rayevsky, sought refuge in the defences of the Fourth Division. Between 10 a.m. and 12 noon his troops took a stand in the center of the Russian line and held off French attacks, with Baggovut's corps seeing critical action around noon, and Ostermann's corps around 4 p.m. By the end of the battle, the French succeeded in forcing the Russians from their defences, and Miloradovich's troops fell back to the same Smolensk road from where they had started. Baggovut took a stand there and held the road until nightfall against ferocious attacks by Polish cavalry.

After the battle, Miloradovich took command of the rearguard, sheltering Kutuzov's army from the advancing French. Enemy pressure prevented him from attending the Council in Fili that decided to surrender Moscow. Miloradovich, acting on behalf of Kutuzov, made a deal with Murat: if the French wanted Moscow intact, they had to allow Miloradovich free passage to the east, or face stubborn urban warfare. Hereford George wrote that "Murat apparently deemed it beneath his dignity to confer with a mere general" and that he left the talks to Sébastiani. According to Fyodor Glinka, however, Murat and Miloradovich negotiated directly with each other prior to the surrender of Moscow; Miloradovich contacted Sébastiani only after the French took Moscow and their cavalry engaged the Russian rear. Sébastiani honored the accord, called back the cavalry and allowed the safe retreat of two Russian regiments trapped between advancing French columns. Temporary loss of contact between Murat and the Russian rearguard allowed Kutuzov to make a westward turn: Murat kept on advancing south-east towards Bronnitsy while Kutuzov marched in the opposite direction.

On September 20 [O.S. September 8], Kutuzov took defensive positions at Podolsk and dispatched Miloradovich to take position in front of the advancing French, 12 kilometers to the east. Four days later, Murat engaged Miloradovich and forced him to fall back to Krasnaya Pakhra (deliberately setting a trap, according to Glinka). Miloradovich barely escaped death or captivity when his headquarters were raided by French cavalry scouts on September 27 [O.S. September 15]. On September 29 [O.S. September 17], Miloradovich successfully counterattacked Murat's corps at Chirikovo, taking one general de brigade prisoner. At this point, Kutuzov preferred to retreat further south; the main army marched to Tarutino, while Miloradovich, now having Ostermann-Tolstoy's corps under his command, retreated to a fallback position on the Chernishnya River, 8 kilometers north of Tarutino. Glinka wrote that from September 9 [O.S. August 28] to October 5 [O.S. September 23] Miloradovich was continuously fighting the French, including four significant battles, and lamented that few of his deeds reached the public eye: "He is not a hero of the Vedomosti, but a hero of history and of the future." During the standoff on the Chernishnya, Miloradovich had another person-to-person negotiation with Murat, while his own camp was filled with masses of French stragglers taken prisoner. Modern Russian historians criticized as indecisive his actions in the Battle of Tarutino (October 18 [O.S. October 6]), when poor coordination of Russian columns met its match in poor discipline of the French camp, but to contemporaries like Glinka and William Cathcart the battle was a clear success.

After the Battle of Maloyaroslavets, Russian troops split into three pursuit columns, led by Miloradovich, Matvey Platov and Kutuzov himself. Miloradovich marched directly on Vyazma, occupied by four French corps (Beauharnais, Davout, Ney, Poniatowski), while Platov closed in on it from the north. On October 31 [O.S. October 19] Miloradovich and Platov agreed to storm Vyazma. The Battle of Vyazma began at dawn of November 3 [O.S. October 22]. Miloradovich quickly deployed front-line artillery that withstood Beauharnais's counterstrike and forced Davout's troops to take cover in the forest. Davout lost two hours taking a detour to reunite with Ney in Vyazma; at 2 p.m., when Miloradovich ordered a general assault, the French were already unable to resist. By 5 p.m. Miloradovich took control of the city, capturing French supply trains (but only three cannons).

On November 15 [O.S. November 3] Miloradovich's three corps, marching ahead of the retreating French, took position to the French rear near Krasny. Miloradovich began the three-day Battle of Krasnoi by capturing a large supply train and cutting Ney and Beauharnais off from Napoleon's army. The next day, Beauharnais exhausted his troops in a breakthrough and refused Miloradovich's invitation to surrender; at night the decimated remains of his corps escaped through the woods. On November 18 [O.S. November 6] Ney made his own unsuccessful attempt to break through Miloradovich's defences. Miloradovich again offered honorable surrender, but Ney arrested the messenger and expended his 10th and 11th divisions in a frontal assault. At night his forces of 3,000 men escaped over the frozen Dnieper, but only 800 made it to Orsha. Miloradovich missed the opportunity to intercept the French crossing of Berezina by two days.

In December 1812, Alexander awarded Miloradovich the Order of St. George, 2nd class. In line with Kutuzov's December Plan, Miloradovich led a Russian vanguard due west and took Warsaw on 8 February [O.S. 27 January] 1813.

=== Campaign of 1813–1814 ===
The appointment of Peter Wittgenstein as commander-in-chief of the united Russian and Prussian armies provoked open hostility from his new subordinates and, at the same time, from his seniors: Miloradovich, Barclay de Tolly, Langeron, Platov and Tormasov. Tormasov refused to obey Wittgenstein altogether and left the army, while Miloradovich stayed and became the "official speaker" for the opposition. The conflict burned until the failures at Lutzen and Bautzen compelled Wittgenstein to resign his command.

Miloradovich's own record in May 1813 was mixed: at Lutzen his corps of 12,000 men arrived too late to influence the outcome. In the following week he covered the retreat to the Elbe. Thiers wrote that the French "made him pay dearly for his useless boast" (his resolve to defend a certain position). Cathcart praised his skillful rearguard action but noted that by May 12 his corps had shrunk to about 10,000. At Bautzen, Miloradovich managed to push Oudinot out of Tronberg, but the battle as a whole remained a French victory.

Miloradovich and Constantine spent the remainder of the war, almost a year, in close cooperation and proximity as chiefs of infantry and cavalry reserves. In August 1813, after expiry of the Truce of Pläswitz, Miloradovich led the reserve force of 24,000 Guards and Grenadiers into Bohemia and Constantine followed him with 11,000 "splendid cavalry" and artillery. Together with Barclay's headquarters, they formed one of four allied columns that converged on Dresden but had not been brought into the action of the Battle of Dresden. Three days later they were employed against Vandamme in the Battle of Kulm, a "fortunate victory that conferred advantages beyond all calculations". On the eve of the Battle of Leipzig the forces of Miloradovich and Constantine, stationed near Margeborn, formed the reserve of the coalition army. In December 1813 they crossed the Rhine and headed into France.

Miloradovich's actions in 1813 were rewarded with the Order of St. Andrew, the title of count and the right to wear Alexander's insignia on his shoulder, the first such honor ever granted in Russia. Miloradovich concluded the campaign of 1814, his last one, in Paris. After General Gorchakov's infantry overran the French defensive artillery, Miloradovich was the one to bring in twenty howitzers and open fire at the city.

== Governor of Saint Petersburg ==
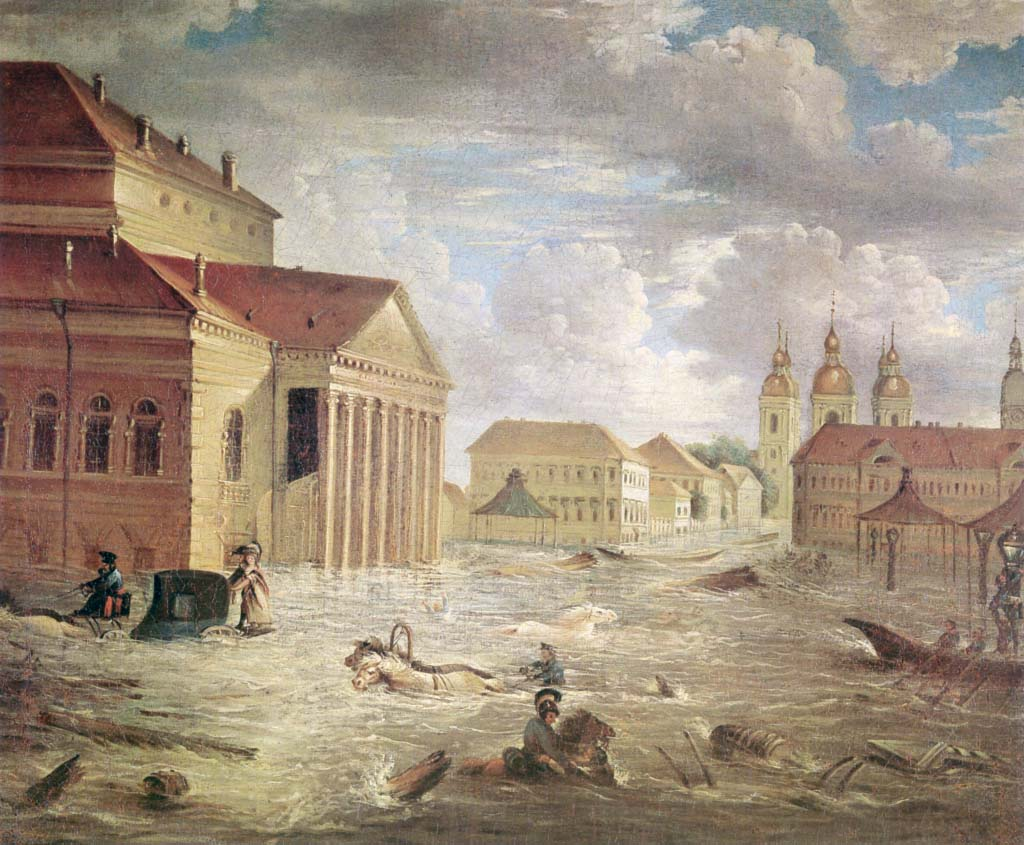
Bolshoi Kamenny Theatre during the flood of 1824. Handling flood damage and managing theatre were two best known sides of Miloradovich's administration.

After the Treaty of Fontainebleau Alexander appointed Miloradovich commander of the Russian Imperial Guard; in 1818 Miloradovich became Governor of Saint Petersburg, assuming command of all the troops, police and civil administration of the imperial capital. He had the unconditional trust of Alexander, who could hardly have found a worse candidate for the job. As chief of police, Miloradovich controlled political surveillance and investigation in Saint Petersburg, but the events of 1825 demonstrated that he ultimately failed to respond to the real threat: he dismissed the evidence against the Decembrists, saying "It's all stuff; leave these young blockheads alone to read to each other their trash of miserable verses."

His affection for the arts and his ex officio duty as a censor at the peak of the Golden Age of Russian Poetry resulted in frequent contacts with authors and actors, and, apart from his death and his actions during the disastrous flood of 1824, his administration was remembered largely through anecdotes and artists' memoirs of varying reliability. This was not uncommon for Russian commanders; Nikolay Raevsky said "They [the writers of his time] turned me into a Roman, Miloradovich into a great man, Wittgenstein into the saviour of the fatherland, and Kutuzov into Fabius. I am not a Roman, and neither are these gentlemen."

Alexander Herzen who met Miloradovich in early childhood and fondly remembered him as a storyteller "with the greatest vivacity, with lively mimicry, with roars of laughter" ridiculed Miloradovich as an administrator yet called him "a warrior poet who understood poetry ... grand things are done by great means." Herzen's memoirs provide a number of anecdotes about Miloradovich the administrator (none of which could have been witnessed by the narrator).

In 1820 Miloradovich interrogated Alexander Pushkin on suspicion of political propaganda. Pushkin's name had already become a blanket cover for all kinds of incendiary pamphlets and he was desperate to clear himself of dangerous misattributions. Pushkin said that he burned his "contraband poems" and recited some from memory. Miloradovich said "Ah, c'est chevaleresque", dismissed the charges and sent Pushkin on a well-paid tour of the south. Vladimir Nabokov noted that all of Pushkin's influential friends could not have saved him had it not been for Miloradovich's "amiable conduct of the whole affair". There was a rumor that Pushkin was flogged on orders of Miloradovich, who fought a duel with at least one person who repeated it.

Author and publisher Nikolai Grech recounted another, less inspiring episode: in 1824 Miloradovich vigorously investigated an alleged breach of censorship rules at a printshop owned by Grech and Bezacque. Fifteen years earlier, when Miloradovich and Pyotr Bagration had a feud, Bezacque was Bagration's secretary and apparently became a lifelong enemy of Miloradovich. Grech easily refuted "factual evidence" and could have escaped unharmed, but Miloradovich brought his belated revenge down on Grech, inflicting on him a full police and court inquiry that dragged on until 1828. Miloradovich probably did not realise that the whole case was set up by Aleksey Arakcheyev and Mikhail Magnitsky to unseat Alexander Golitsyn.

The lifestyle of the "bizarre administrator" was just as bizarre. Miloradovich lived alone in a luxurious apartment "in complete disarray coupled with the most exquisite taste", without a single bedroom; "I spend the night where I feel like", he used to say. Family fortune and rewards from the tsar could not match his spending, and he sold off most of his lands and serfs. Posthumous sale of his remaining estate barely covered his debts.

== Theatre and sexuality ==
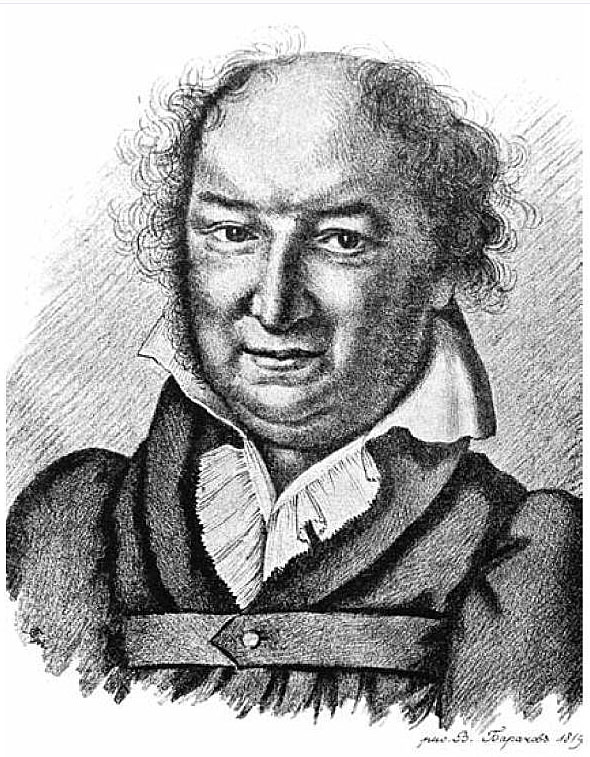
Theatre manager Alexander Shakhovskoy allegedly provided female company to Miloradovich.

In 1821, theatre managers Apollon Maikov and Prince Alexander Shakhovskoy allegedly tried to manipulate Miloradovich to overthrow the stern and frugal director of imperial theatres, Prince Tyufyakin. Miloradovich lent them support and then himself "grabbed both the power and the purse strings"; Miloradovich, Maikov and Shakhovskoy became a "committee of three formidable officials" that governed the everyday life of the imperial theatres. The change coincided with rumours of Shakhovskoy's trafficking in actresses; the death of Miloradovich and the ascension of Nicholas I ended Shakhovskoy's career.

The private life of Miloradovich, who never married and had no offspring, has been a controversial subject. Contemporaries condemned him for a desire "to create his own harem in the theatre school" that allegedly became a reality with the aid of Shakhovskoy and Maikov. According to these sources, Miloradovich "had a weakness for women" and regularly spent evenings in the company of Shakhovskoy and female trainees of his theatre school; the chosen favorites then enjoyed the general's benevolence after graduation. Catherine Shuler noted that the appetites of Miloradovich and other dignitaries could be the cause of high "traffic in women" on stage and that "the resemblance between serf actresses and imperial actresses is surely not coincidental". Alexandra Kolosova, in 1822, was the first actress to break the ring and flee to Paris; upon return to Saint Petersburg she sought protection from Alexander, but Miloradovich had her arrested for twenty-four hours for turning down "the most insignificant role" offered to her. Miloradovich had lead actor Vasily Karatygin arrested for similar insubordination; when the prisoner's mother pleaded for mercy, Miloradovich responded: "I only like comedy onstage. I've seen blood, madam, tears don't move me".

Vladimir Bryukhanov suggested that Miloradovich was homosexual, disregarding or dismissing evidence to the contrary, such as the memoirs of Nadezhda Durova. (Durova, disguised as a young man, was aide to Miloradovich in 1810 and later wrote about his affairs with women and their influence on the general's demeanor and on his relationships with subordinate officers.) The standard version of events holds that his last passion was ballerina Yekaterina Teleshova, who earlier had an affair with Alexander Griboyedov, a diplomat "too short of money to be a long-term rival to the general" (In 1825, Griboyedov wrote "... Miloradovich, that boastful idiot whom Shakhovskoy grovels to and idolises. They are both cattle.").

== Interregnum ==
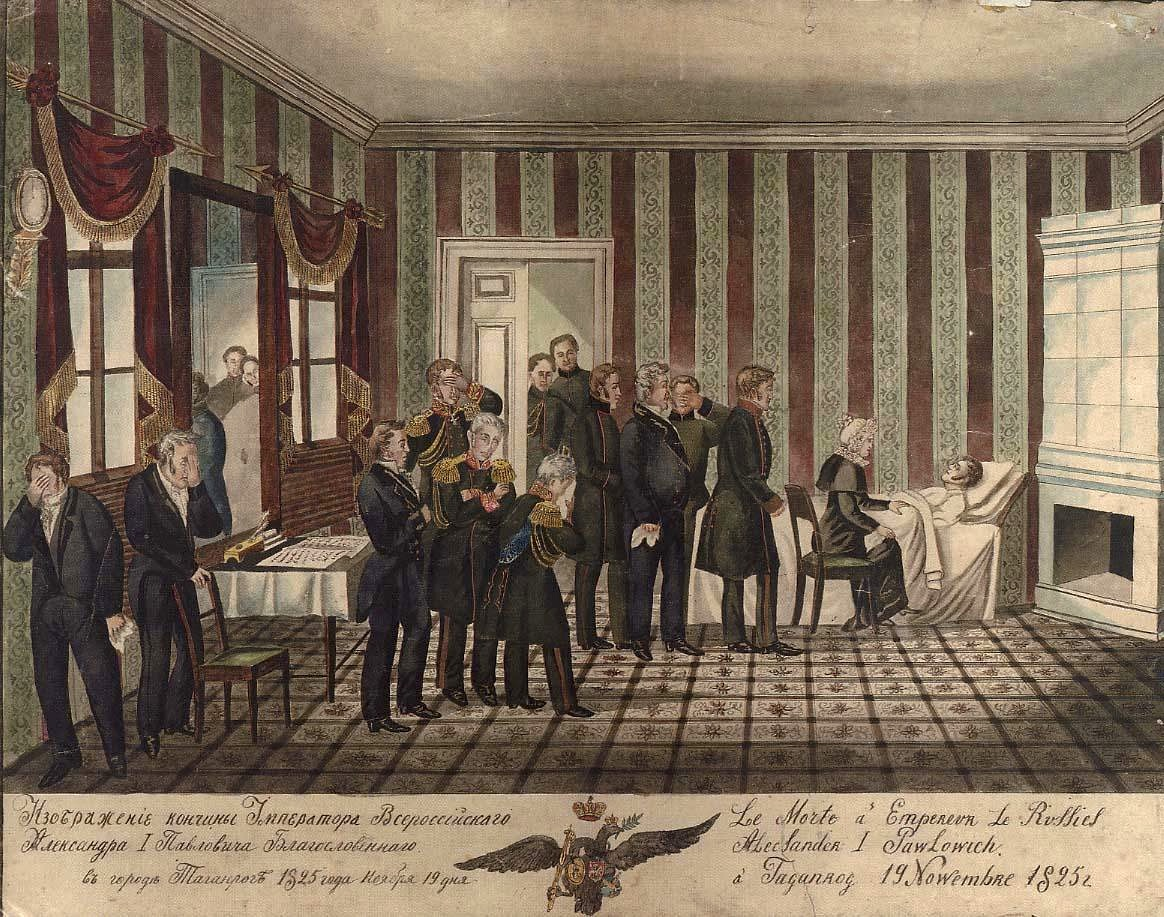
The death of Alexander I in Taganrog was followed with an interregnum that culminated in the Decembrist revolt.

In the summer of 1823, Alexander I issued a secret manifest excluding Constantine from the order of succession and making Nicholas heir presumptive to the throne. Historians argue as to whether or not Miloradovich had been formally made aware of Alexander's decision. Only three men – Aleksey Arakcheyev, Alexander Golitsyn, and Archbishop Filaret – definitely knew the contents and whereabouts of the manifest; neither Constantine nor Nicholas knew the whole story.

On 9 December [O.S. 27 November] 1825, when news of Alexander's death in Taganrog reached Saint Petersburg, Miloradovich bullied Nicholas into pledging allegiance to Constantine, who was then living in Warsaw as viceroy of Poland. Golitsyn arrived at the palace later and announced the terms of Alexander's manifest, but Miloradovich persuaded the State Council that Nicholas was aware of it and that his pledge of allegiance to Constantine was effectively an act of abdication. Miloradovich then sent a messenger to Moscow with two instructions: to pledge allegiance to Constantin and to keep the original of Alexander's manifest secret and locked away. Faced with the question, "What if Constantine holds to his resignation?", Miloradovich allegedly responded, "When one has one hundred thousand bayonets in one's pocket, it is easy to speak with boldness".

Correspondence between Saint Petersburg and Warsaw took two weeks, during which Miloradovich acted as de facto interrex and regularly assured Nicholas that "everything is quiet". Constantine firmly refused to reign and blessed his brother's accession to the throne, but for a while the hesitant Nicholas took no action. On the morning of December 24 [O.S. December 12], Nicholas received detailed reports of the brewing Decembrist revolt from Diebitsch and Chernyshov, and discussed the matter with Miloradovich and Golitsyn. According to Nicholas himself, the evidence was overwhelming. Miloradovich promised to mobilise all police resources but did nothing or, according to Korf, his "investigations remained completely fruitless. His researches had not discovered one person on whom suspicion could reasonably fall".

The actions of Miloradovich during the interregnum were highly controversial and provoked fringe conspiracy theories placing him at the top of the Decembrist rebel ring. Mainstream historians provide different explanations of his motives, none of which supports the theory of "Decembrist Miloradovich":

- Mikhail Safonov suggested that there were three contenders for the throne: Constantin, Nicholas and their mother Maria Fyodorovna. Miloradovich supported Maria but in public he aligned with Constantine and later with Nicholas. A similar version has been fictionalised by Igor Bunich.
- Yakov Gordin suggested that Miloradovich acted as an independent dictator, using Constantine merely as a front.
- Andreeva supports a toned-down variation of Gordin's suggestion: that, regardless of Alexander's manifest, Miloradovich acted in good faith, supporting what he thought was the legitimate solution to a crisis.

== Revolt and death ==
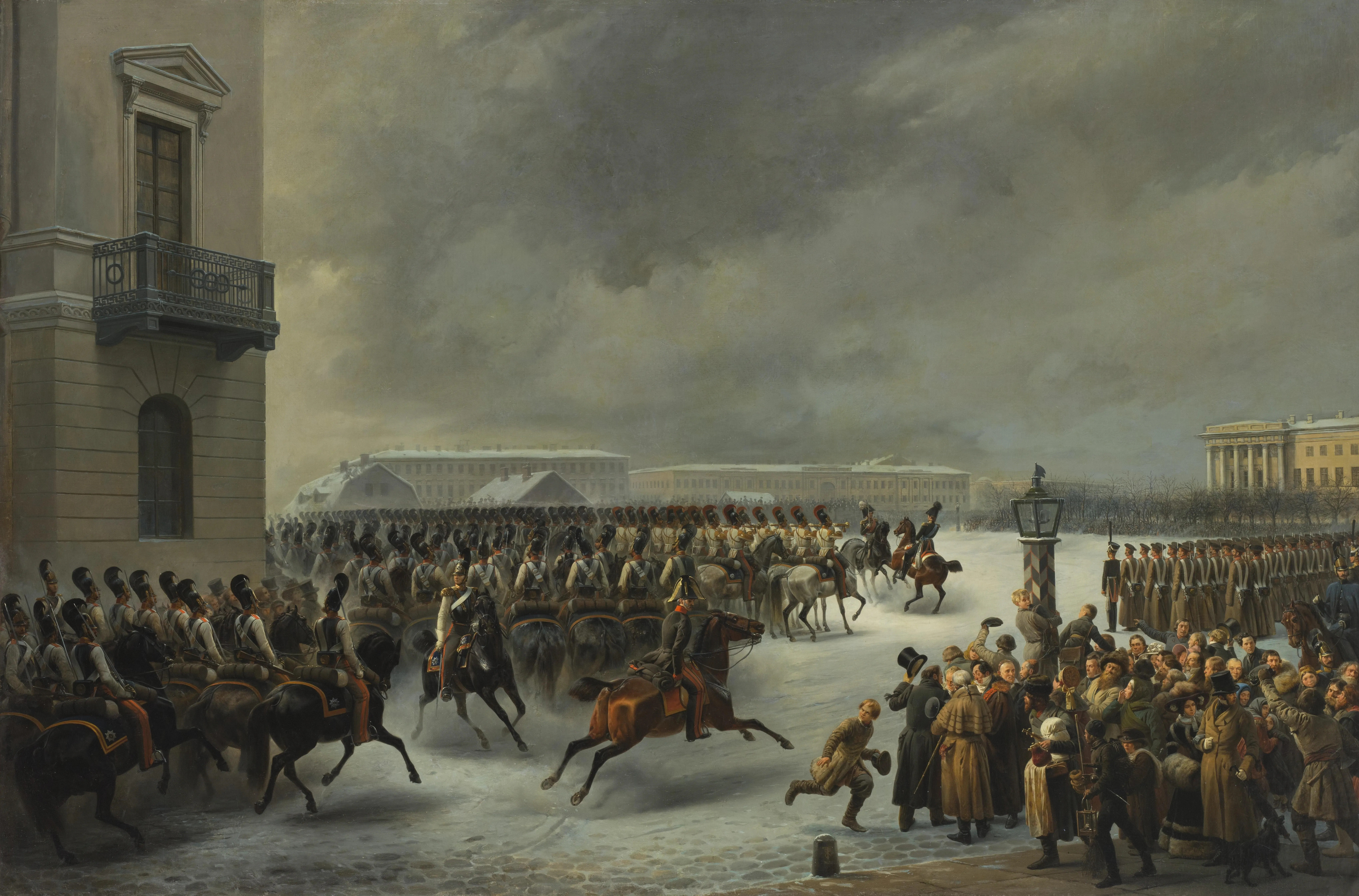
Rebellion on Senate Square, 26 December [O.S. 14 December] 1825

At 8 p.m. on December 25 [O.S. December 13], Nicholas declared himself emperor; at 7 a.m. the next morning, along with all senior statesmen present in Saint Petersburg, Miloradovich pledged his loyalty to Nicholas (Korf suggested that Miloradovich recognised Nicholas as early as December 24 [O.S. December 12]). Once again Miloradovich assured Nicholas that the city was "perfectly tranquil"; Alexander von Benckendorff and other witnesses wrote that he was in his usual boastful, optimistic mood. Three hours later when Miloradovich enjoyed breakfast with Teleshova, general Neidhardt reported to Nicholas that the troops were marching towards the palace "in absolute mutiny".

At about noon on December 26 [O.S. December 14] Miloradovich, whom nobody had seen since the morning, reported to Nicholas on Palace Square. Witnesses disagree on whether he was mounted or on foot, but all accounts point to his extraordinary excitement and loss of self-control. According to Nicholas, Miloradovich told him: "Сеlа va mаl; ils marchent au Sénat, mais je vais leur раrlеr" (French: "That is bad; they are marching toward the Senate, but I will talk to them"). Nicholas coldly responded that Miloradovich must do his duty as the military governor and calm his troops down. Miloradovich saluted, turned around, and headed to the barracks of the Horse Guards. General Orlov of the Horse Guards pleaded with Miloradovich to stay with the loyal troops but Miloradovich refused to take cover, mounted a horse and rode out to the rows of rebel troops, accompanied either by two aides or only by Bashutsky on foot. Miloradovich harangued the soldiers for obedience, showing Constantine's sword "to prove that he would have been incapable of betraying him". Safonov pointed out that, instead of executing the tsar's order to lead the Mounted Guards against the rebels, Miloradovich "disobeyed it in a most incredible way ... by going into the action alone."

Between 12:20 and 12:30 Pyotr Kakhovsky shot Miloradovich point-blank in the back; "the bullet travelling up from below, from the back to the chest, tore the diaphragm, broke through all the parts and stopped beneath the right nipple". When Miloradovich slumped from his horse to the ground, Yevgeny Obolensky stabbed him with a bayonet. Miloradovich was taken to a nearby house, but by the time the surgeons arrived on the scene the marauders had stripped Miloradovich of his clothes, medals and jewelry. Medics removed the bullet (it was later delivered to Nicholas); Miloradovich remained conscious and dictated his last will in a letter to the tsar. There were three requests: to send His Majesty's regards to his relatives, to grant liberty to his serfs, and to "not forget the old Maikov". Miloradovich died around 3 a.m. on December 27 [O.S. December 15]. After six days of lying in state, he was buried with honors at the Alexander Nevsky Lavra.

The investigation of the Decembrist revolt led to the hanging of Kakhovsky and four of his ringleaders; it did not reveal any illicit connection between the Decembrists and Miloradovich. The second killer, Obolensky, was stripped of his princely title and exiled to Siberia for thirteen years.

== Nobility ==
The Miloradović noble family is listed in the nobility of the Russian Empire.

== See also ==
- Serbs in Russia
- Andrei Miloradovich
- Peter Mikhailovich Kaptzevich
- Nikolay Vuich
- Peter Ivanovich Ivelich
- Ivan Shevich
- Avram Ratkov
- Ivan Adamovich
- Nikolay Bogdanov
- Nikolay Depreradovich
- Ivan Lukačević (soldier)
- Jovan Šević
- Jovan Albanez
- Simeon Piščević
- Anto Gvozdenović
- Semyon Zorich
- Peter Tekeli
- Georgi Emmanuel
- Dejan Subotić
- Fedor Yakovlevich Mirkovich
- Marko Ivelich
- Rajko Depreradović
- Marko Voinovich
- Skarzynski

== Notes ==
=== Materials used ===
- "МИЛОРАДОВИЧ МИХАИЛ АНДРЕЕВИЧ • Great Russian Encyclopedia – Electronic version". old.bigenc.ru. 2023.
