= Ali Pasha (vizier) =

Ottoman Turk statesman

Ali Pasha Pasha
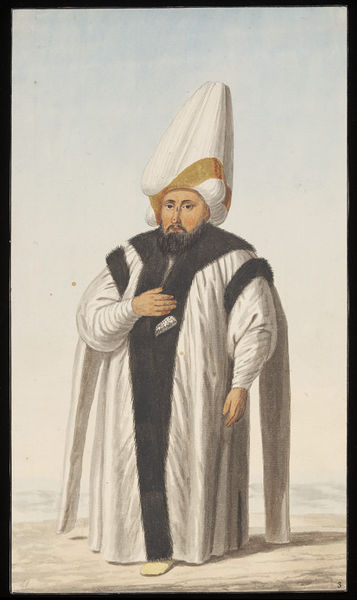
- Image of Ali Pasha Vizier of the Ottoman Empire

165th Grand Vizier of the Ottoman Empire
- In office 1 January 1809 – March 1809
- Monarch: Mahmud II
- Preceded by: Çavuşbaşı Memiş Pasha
- Succeeded by: Kör Yusuf Ziyaüddin Pasha

Governor of Konya
- In office December 1810 – January 1814

Governor of Trabzon
- In office December 1807 – December 1810

Personal details
- Died: September 1823 Tokat, Allied occupied Turkey (now Ankara, Turkey)

Military service
- Battles/wars: Russo-Turkish War: Battle of Karalas; Battle of Obilești; Battle of Trabzon; Tekeli Rebellion 1814

Çarhacı Ali Pasha (died 1823 in Tokat) was an Ottoman Turk statesman who briefly held the office of Grand Vizier under Sultan Mahmud II, serving from January to March 1809.

== Life ==
Ali Pasha, originally from Konya, began his career after entering the vizier's office, where he learned literacy and administrative skills. He accompanied Yusuf Ziya Pasha to Egypt and later served as seal keeper to Hurşit Pasha. In 1804, he was appointed to guard Yenbu’l-Bahr with the rank of Mirimiran. Following Hurşit Pasha's removal from the Egyptian governorship in 1805, Ali Pasha returned with him to Istanbul. By January 1807, he had been promoted to vizier and made both army commander and governor of Silistre, gaining recognition for leading the advance forces and inflicting heavy losses on Russian troops at Karalas. Later that year, he was reassigned to guard Eğriboz. In December 1808, he became district governor of the grand vizier's jurisdiction and, in April 1809, also took the position of Kaptan-ı Derya. His fortunes shifted in September 1809 when he was removed from both posts, demoted to governor of Alaiye, stripped of his vizier rank, and exiled to Lemnos. Though pardoned later, he went on to serve as governor of Trabzon, where he repelled Russian attacks before being dismissed again in 1810 and exiled to Ankara.

After a period in Ankara, Ali Pasha was reinstated as vizier and governor of Konya, and later appointed Serasker to suppress Tekeli İbrahim Bey's rebellion. His failed campaign in early 1814 led to another loss of his vizier title and a second exile to Lemnos, later moved to Keşan. Once again pardoned, he served as guard of Kars, followed by governorships in Sivas, Karahisar (1818), Alaiye and İçel (1819), and a second term in Eğriboz (1820). In 1821, he was dismissed from office, deprived of his vizier rank once more, and exiled to Tokat, where he died in September 1823.
