= Vlădiceasca =

Vlădiceasca may refer to several villages in Romania:

- Vlădiceasca, a village in Valea Argovei Commune, Călărași County
- Vlădiceasca, a village in Snagov Commune, Ilfov County
