= Battle of Obilești =

1807 military action in the Russo-Turkish war of 1806–1812

- Part of the Russo-Turkish War (1806–1812)
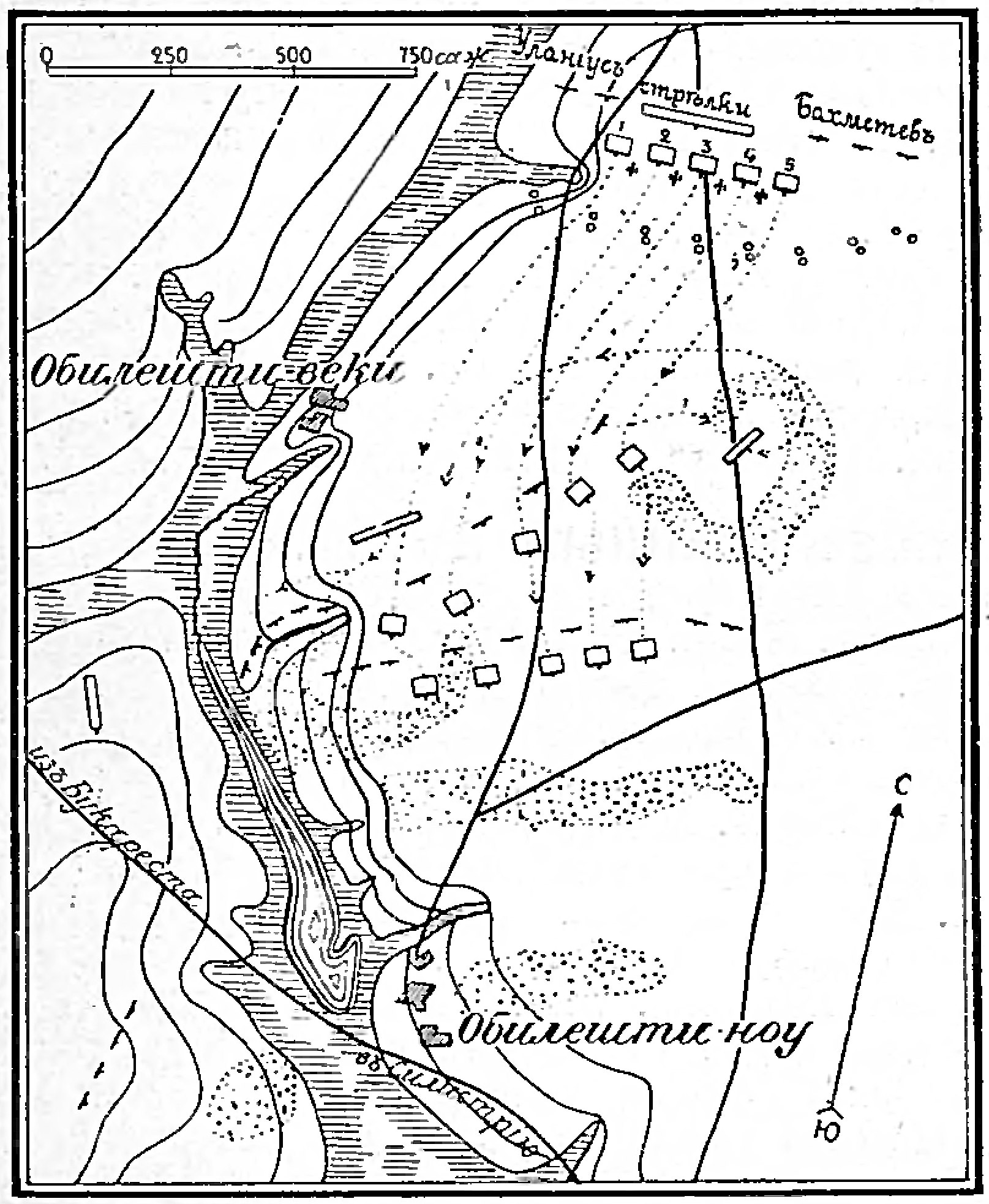
- Battleplan
Date	15 July 1807
Location	Obilești (now Valea Argovei), Wallachia (now Romania)
Result	Russian victory

Belligerents
(Russia) Russian Empire	Ottoman Empire

Commanders and leaders
Mikhail Miloradovich; Carl Olanus; Aleksey Bakhmetev; General Rehbinder	Çarhacı Ali Pasha

Strength
7,000–10,000 soldiers	12,000–13,000 soldiers

Casualties and losses
291–1,000 killed and wounded	3,000 killed and wounded 29 captured

The Battle of Obilești was fought in Obilești (now Valea Argovei), Wallachia (now Romania), between Russia and the Ottoman Empire as a part of the Napoleonic Wars during the Russo-Turkish War of 1806–1812.

== Battle ==
Grand Vizier İbrahim Hilmi Pasha came to the front with the main Ottoman army. He remained inactive in Silistra and awaited orders after the Ottoman coups of 1807–1808 broke out in Istanbul. Upon receiving the attack order from Mustafa, he gave the command to Çarhacı Ali Pasha with 13,000 soldiers and ordered him to cross the Danube river and advance to Bucharest via Obilești (now Valea Argovei). İbrahim Hilmi Pasha followed Ali Pasha with the main part of the army, With this the Grand Vizier planned to advance part of the army to Ismail and the other part to Bucharest and enter between the Russian armies in Wallachia and Moldavia. He was also planning to prevent Serbian forces from uniting with the Russian army by holding the Kladovo–Niš line with the other part of the army.

General Mikhail Miloradovich, who was stationed in Bucharest, had heard about the advance of the Ottoman forces and was planning to eliminate them with a counter-attack. However, since the current position of the Russian forces was not suitable for defense and in danger of being surrounded if they remained in Bucharest, General Miloradovich decided to attack the Ottoman forces advancing on the left bank of the Danube from Silistra. General Miloradovich, who received news of the approach of Ottoman forces on June 12, advanced to Obilești with a force exceeding 10,000 soldiers, including Cossack troops. Çarhacı Ali Pasha retreated to the hills around Obilești and positioned himself for battle.

Russian first column was under General Carl Olanus, the second under General Aleksey Bakhmetev. The clashes began with the first attacks of Ottoman soldiers against the approaching Russian forces on June 15. Despite intense infantry fire from the Russians, the Ottoman forces advanced from the left flank and surrounded 3 Russian cavalry squadrons. In the face of the effective Ottoman attacks, the Russian army added reinforcements and stopped the Ottoman attack. When General Olanus started firing and the cavalry forces under the command of General Rehbinder came to support, the Ottoman army retreated to its old positions, then retreated further in the direction of Silistra.

== Aftermath ==
The Russian Empire suffered a heavy defeat against Napoleon Bonaparte in the Battle of Friedland within the framework of the Fourth Coalition Wars on 12 June 1807. On July 9, 1807, Russia agreed to the Treaties of Tilsit

The Russian Empire wanted to close the Ottoman front and started ceasefire negotiations with the Ottomans, signing an Armistice on 26 August 1807. The state of war between the parties officially paused for nine months and peace negotiations began.
