= Alexander Shakhovskoy =

Russian playwright, writer, poet, librettist, pedagogue, critic and administrator

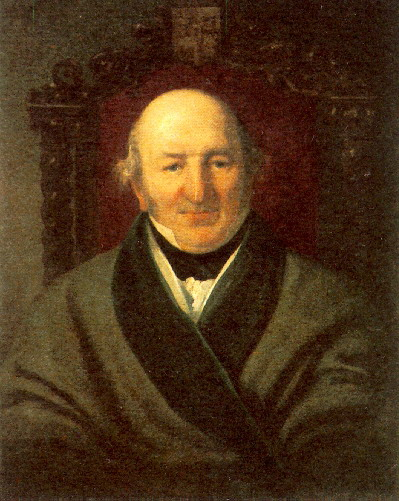
- Born: Александр Александрович Шаховской; 5 May 1777; Smolensk Governorate, Russian Empire
- Died: 12 April 1846 (aged 68); Moscow, Russian Empire
- Occupation: Playwright • writer • critic • theatre administrator
- Website: Shakhovskoy at Lib.ru

Prince Alexander Alexandrovich Shakhovskoy (Russian: Алекса́ндр Алекса́ндрович Шаховско́й; 5 May 1777, in Smolensk Governorate, Russian Empire – 3 February 1846, in Moscow, Russian Empire) was a Russian playwright, writer, poet, librettist, pedagogue, critic, memoirist and administrator (the head, in 1802–1826, of the Imperial Theatres); arguably the most influential figure in the Russian theatre in the early 19th century.

Shakhovskoy, who debuted in 1795 with the comedy Zhenskaya shutka (Ladies' Joke) and enjoyed his first success with Novy Stern (The New Stern, 1805), wrote more than a hundred comedies and vaudevilles, as well as opera librettos and divertissements. Aristophanes (Аристофан, 1825) is considered to be his most accomplished work. Shakhovskoy's way of lampooning in his plays revered figures like Nikolai Karamzin and Vasily Zhukovsky (whom he became great friends with in the 1820s), was commented upon by one of his admirers, Alexander Pushkin in Evgeny Onegin ("...And there caustic Shakhovskoy / Let out his comedies' noisy swarm").

Prince Shakhovskoy tutored (and was instrumental in their respective career development of) several leading Russian actors and actresses, including Vasily Karatygin, Alexandra Kolosova, Ekaterina Semyonova, Ivan Sosnitsky, Yakov Bryansky, Maria Varberkhova and Nikolai Dyur, among others.
