= Battle of Amstetten =

1805 Battle during the War of the Third Coalition

- Part of the War of the Third Coalition
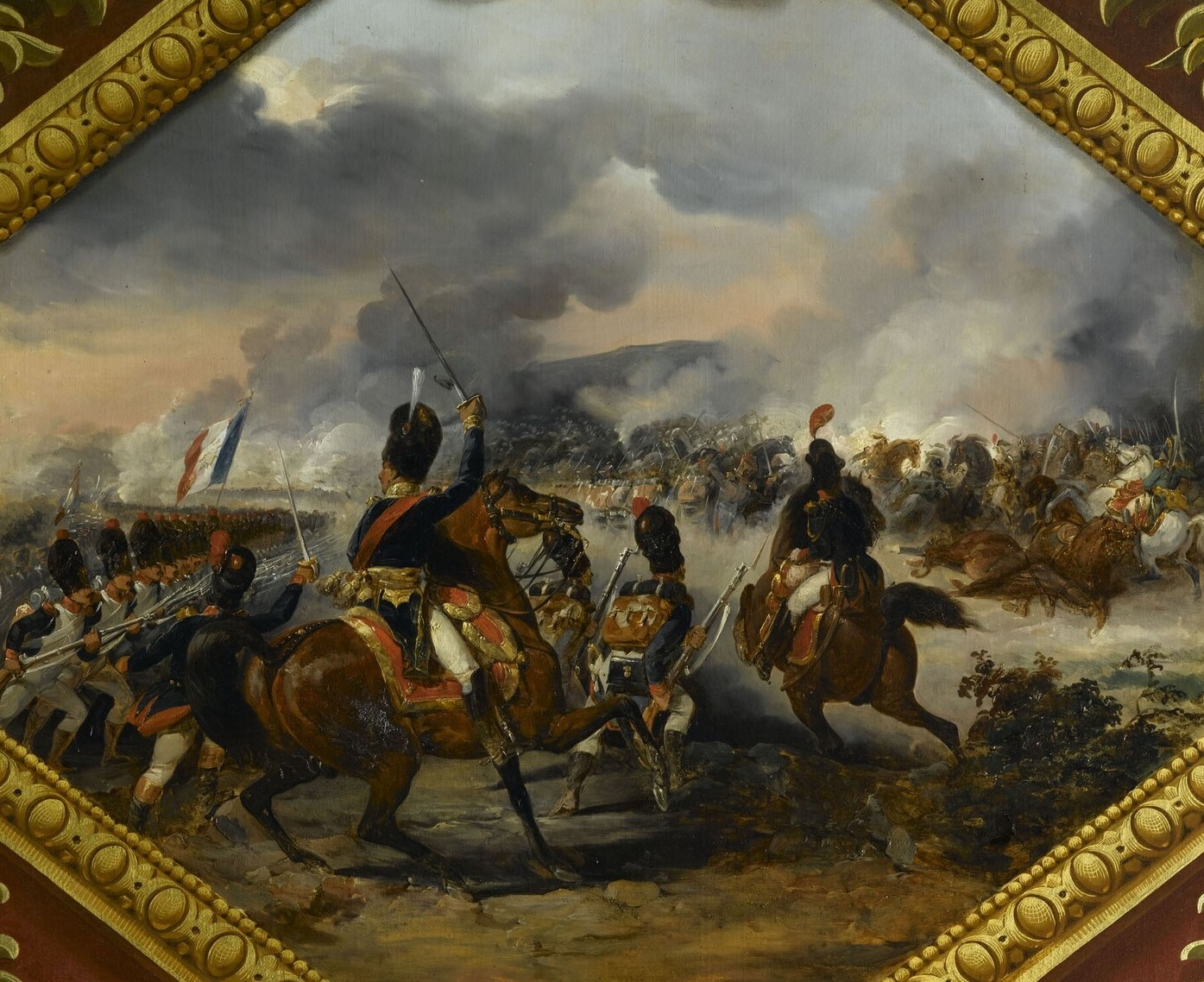
- Battle of Amstetten by Prosper Lafaye and Jean Alaux, 1834-1837
Date	5 November 1805
Location	Amstetten, Lower Austria 48.1167°N 14.8667°E
Result	French victory

Belligerents
France	(Holy Roman Empire) Habsburg Empire (Russian Empire) Russia

Commanders and leaders
(France) Joachim Murat (France) Jean Lannes	(Holy Roman Empire) Michael Kienmayer (Russian Empire) Pyotr Bagration (Russian Empire) Mikhail Miloradovich

Strength
Around 10,000 soldiers	6,700–7,900 soldiers

Casualties and losses
1,000	Russian Empire: 300 killed or wounded <700 prisoners Austrian Empire: 1,000 killed, wounded, or prisoners

War of the Third Coalition:
Austria
current battle
Napoleon in command
Napoleon not in command

The Battle of Amstetten was a minor engagement during the War of the Third Coalition between the First French Empire and the alliance of Austria and Russia. It occurred on 5 November 1805, when the retreating Russo-Austrian troops, led by Mikhail Kutuzov, were intercepted by Marshal Joachim Murat's cavalry and a portion of Marshal Jean Lannes' corps. Pyotr Bagration's rearguard defended against the advancing French troops and allowed the Russian troops to retreat. This was the first fight in which a major part of the Russian Army opposed a significant number of French troops in the open. The rearguard also consisted of Michael von Kienmayer's Austrians. The total number of Russo-Austrian troops was around 6,700, while the French troops numbered roughly 10,000 troops. The Russo-Austrian forces suffered more casualties but were still able to successfully retreat.

== Background ==
The Battle of Amstetten took place during the War of the Third Coalition, which lasted from 1803 to 1806. This battle took place immediately after the Austrian surrender in the Ulm Campaign. Following the surrender of Karl Mack von Leiberich in the Battle of Ulm, the Russian forces led by Kutuzov decided to retreat along the Danube to regroup with other Russian troops. Napoleon was determined to pin down the Russian army and sent Joachim Murat and Jean Lannes to intercept the retreating Russian army.

== Battle ==
The French army initially caught up the Russians around Enns, Austria roughly 50 km west of Amstetten and then again at Oed, which was 3 km west of Amstetten. Bagration decided to fend off the French Army at Amstetten and posted his infantry and cavalry atop the hills on both sides of the main road. The artillery was positioned on the main road for the best line of fire. Murat led an initial charge with his cavalry escort of two squadrons against three Austrian cavalry regiments. His troops were overwhelmed and forced to fall back. Murat's troops were then reinforced by Nicolas Oudinot’s grenadiers who were able to prevent Bagration’s advance and forced his line to retreat back into Amstetten. Murat waited for the balance of his column to arrive with Lannes. Lannes was ordered to move against positions held by Bagration and proceeded to attack. Bagration requested reinformancements and was then joined by Miloradovich along with four infantry regiments, ten cavalry regiments and extra artillery. As the battle persisted, The Russian Jägers were forced to fall back and a further attack upon Amstetten routed a Grenz infantry battalion. The battle dwindled down by nightfall.

== Aftermath ==
One thousand Austrian soldiers were killed, wounded, or captured. Three hundred Russian soldiers were killed or wounded, and fewer than seven hundred were captured. Bagration successfully performed his duty as the rear guard and allowed the remaining Russo-Austrian troops to retreat overnight. The Russo-Austrian troops suffered more casualties than the French army, but there is still confusion regarding who won the battle with both sides stating they were outnumbered.

== Notes ==
Preceded by Battle of Cape Ortegal	Napoleonic Wars; Battle of Amstetten	Succeeded by Battle of Dürenstein
