= Pyotr Kakhovsky =

Russian assassin (1799–1826)

Pyotr Grigoryevich Kakhovsky
- Пётр Григорьевич Каховский
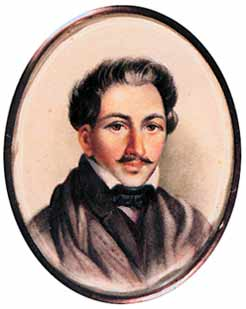
- Born: 1799; Preobrazhenskoye village, Smolensky Uyezd, Smolensk Governorate, Russian Empire
- Died: 25 July [O.S. 13 July] 1826; Saint Petersburg, Russian Empire
- Occupations: Officer, Decembrist

Pyotr Grigoryevich Kakhovsky (Russian: Пётр Григорьевич Каховский, 1799 – 25 July [O.S. 13 July] 1826) was a Russian officer and active participant of the Decembrist revolt, known for the murder of General Mikhail Miloradovich and Colonel Ludwig Niklaus von Stürler.

== Biography ==
Pyotr Kakhovsky was born in 1799 in Smolensk Governorate to a retired collegiate assessor from an impoverished Polish noble family Kakowski h. Kościesza, Gregori Alekseyevich Kakhovsky (1758–n/a), and his wife from the Smolensk branch of the noble family Olenin, Nimfodora Mikhailovna Kakhovskaya (née Olenina). He had five brothers, Aleksey, Vasily, Ivan, Platon, who all died before 1820, and Nikolay (1790–1845). Though he inherited 250 serfs from his parents, his elder brother eventually found only seventeen after his death; the others either had been sold without land, or had run away, or had died.

He studied at Moscow University Boarding School (Московский Университетский Пансион). He started his military career as a Junker at Leib Guard Ranger Regiment in March 1816. In December 1816 he was demoted to Private by the order of Grand Duke Konstantin Pavlovich for "rude behavior in the house of a collegiate assessor, Mrs Wangersheim, not paying his debt to a candy shop, and laziness in military service".

Kakhovsky was sent to the 7th Ranger Regiment to fight in the Caucasian War, where he had made a fast career: in November 1817 he became a Junker, in November 1819 he became a poruchik, in 1821 retired his military service because of an illness. In 1823 he traveled for medical treatment to Dresden, then Paris and Switzerland, Italy and Austria. After returning to Russia he settled in Saint Petersburg (1824).

At that time, he was very enthusiastic about the history of Rome, especially Brutus killing of Julius Caesar and pronounced that he sought a similar fate. The decision may have been prompted by the rejection of his hand by S.M. Saltykova.

Kakhovsky became an active member of the Northern Society of the Decembrists and an assistant to Kondraty Fyodorovich Ryleyev. He was the founder of the Decembrist section in Grenadier regiment. At the North Society meeting December 13 O.S. 1825 he was charged with killing emperor Nicholas I of Russia and the Imperial family in the Winter Palace. However, the next day, the actual day of the revolt, Kakhovsky hesitated and decided that the religion did not allow him to kill the emperor. Instead he went to Senate Square with the rest of Decembrists. He shot and fatally wounded the governor of Saint Petersburg and a popular hero of the Napoleonic Wars, General Mikhail Andreyevich Miloradovich, who attempted to pacify the Decembrists troops and prevent the bloodletting. Kakhovsky also killed the commander of the Life-guard grenadier regiment colonel Ludwig Niklaus von Stürler who went to the Senate Square to persuade his soldiers not to take part in the uprising, and wounded another officer Gastfer.

Kakhovsky was arrested at his own apartment on December 15 O.S. (the day after the revolt). He argued before the Investigating Commission, that the high-handedness of the bureaucracy, the lack of respect for ancient gentry freedom, and the favoritism shown to foreigners had been the primary cause of the suppressed uprising. He was one of the five, sentenced to death by quartering, but later the tsar replaced this cruel punishment by hanging. He was executed (at the second attempt) along with four other ringleaders—Pavel Pestel, Sergey Muravyov-Apostol, Mikhail Bestuzhev-Ryumin and Kondraty Ryleyev on a crownwork of the Peter and Paul Fortress on 25 July 1826, and presumably interred with the rest of the five in a secret grave on Goloday Island in Saint Petersburg.

== Legacy ==
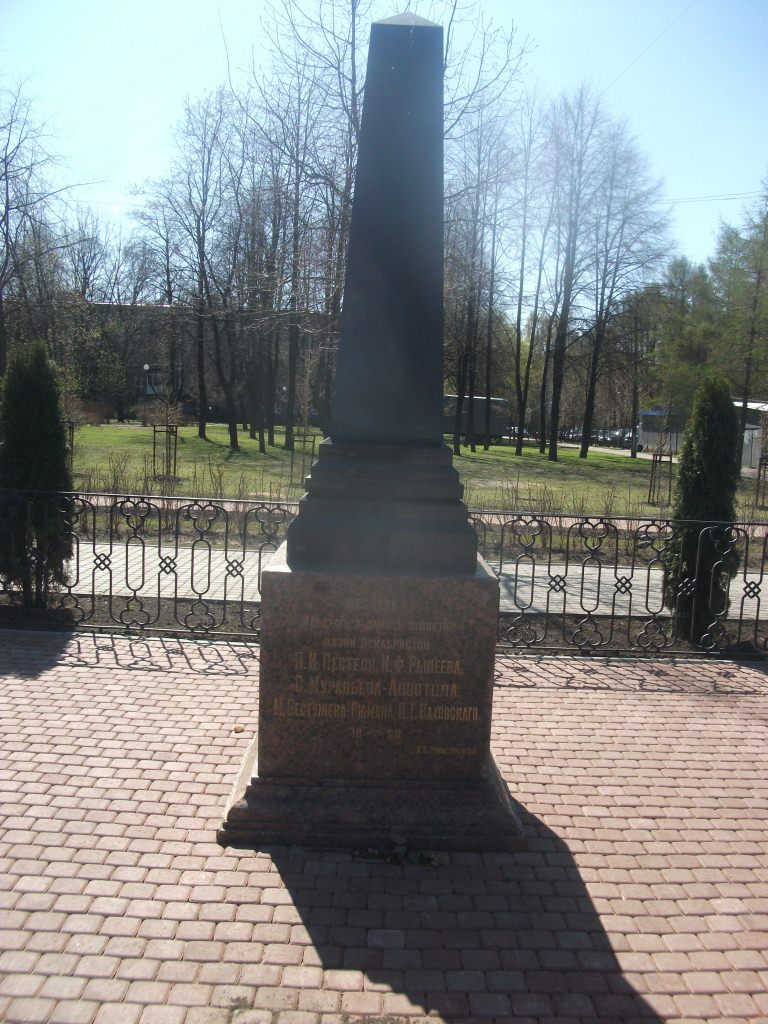
A commemorative stele to the Five Decemberists on Dekabristov Island.

His grandniece Irina Konstantinovna Kakhovskaya (1887 – 1960) was a Left Socialist-Revolutionary militant and also became a terrorist: in 1918 she collaborated in the assassination of the German governor of Ukraine Hermann von Eichhorn, and actively worked in two failed attempts on the lives of Hetman Pavlo Skoropadskyi and General Anton Denikin. She spent most of her life in Tsarist and Soviet prisons, or in internal exile.

The monuments to Pyotr Kakhovsky and four other executed Decemberists were placed on their probable burial place on Dekabristov Island (former Goloday Island).

On 3 August 1940, the Soviet authorities renamed former Golodaevsky Lane in Leningrad (present-day Saint Petersburg) to Kakhovskogo Lane in his honor.
