= Decembrist revolt =

1825 failed coup in the Russian Empire

- Part of the Revolutions during the 1820s
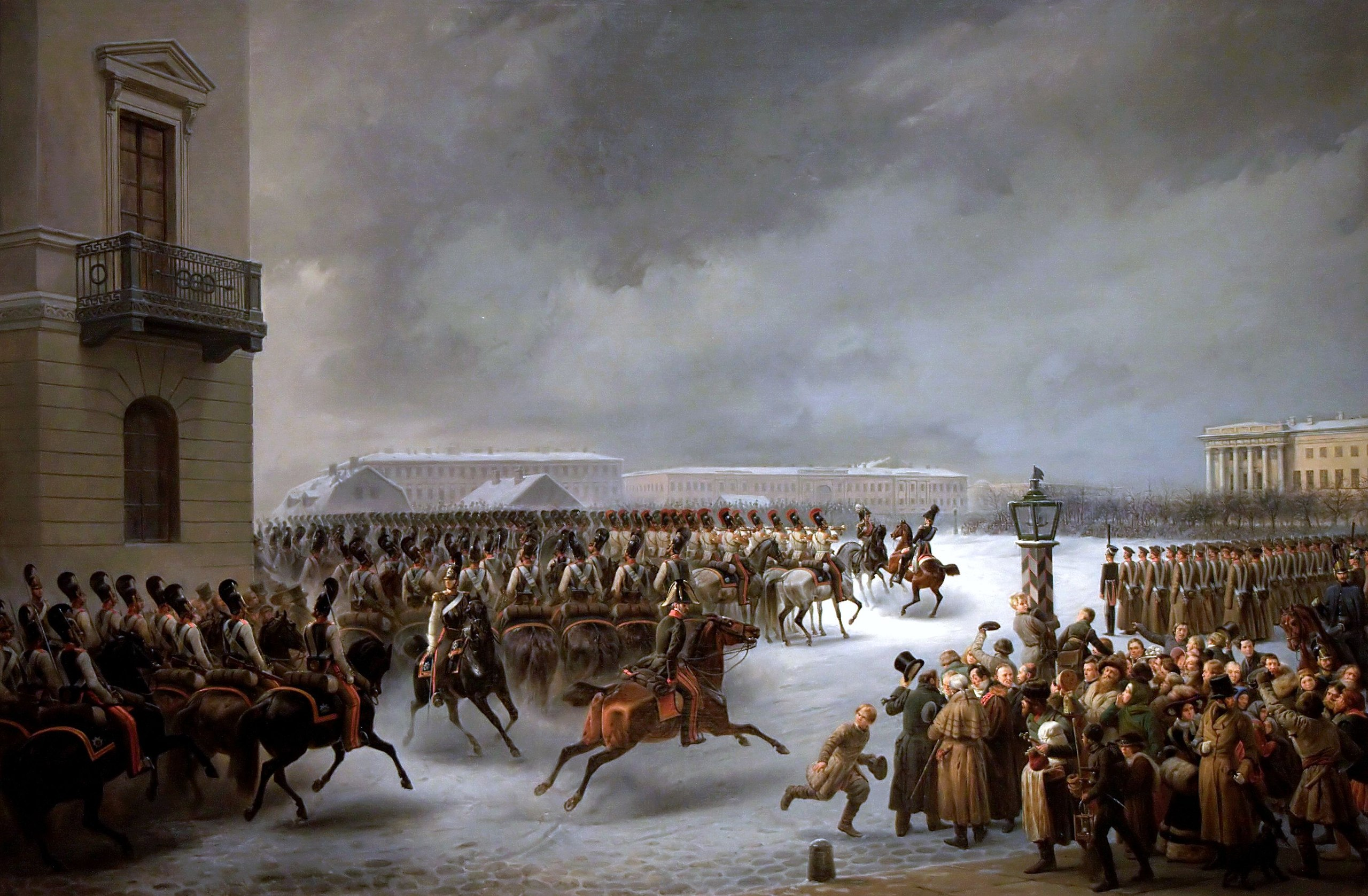
- Decembrists at Peter's Square (Georg Wilhelm Timm, 1853)
Date	26 December [O.S. 14 December] 1825
Location	Saint Petersburg, Russian Empire
Result	Government victory: Decembrists executed or deported to Siberia

Belligerents
Northern Society of the Decembrists	Russian Empire

Commanders and leaders
Sergei Trubetskoy; Yevgeny Obolensky; Nikita Muravyov; Pavel Pestel (executed); Pyotr Kakhovsky (executed); Kondraty Ryleyev (executed)	(Russian Empire) Nicholas I (Russian Empire) Mikhail Miloradovich †

Strength
3,000 soldiers	9,000 soldiers

The Decembrist revolt (Russian: Восстание декабристов, romanized: Vosstaniye dekabristov, lit. 'Uprising of the Decembrists') was a failed coup d'état led by liberal military and political dissidents against the Russian Empire. It took place in Saint Petersburg on 26 December [O.S. 14 December] 1825, following the death of Emperor Alexander I.

Alexander's brother and heir-presumptive Grand Duke Konstantin Pavlovich privately renounced his claim to the throne two years prior to Alexander's sudden death on 1 December [O.S. 19 November] 1825. The next in the line of succession therefore was younger brother Nicholas, who would ascend the throne as Emperor Nicholas I. Neither the Russian government nor the general public were initially aware of Konstantin's renunciation, and as a result, parts of the military took a premature oath of loyalty to Konstantin. A general swearing of loyalty to the true emperor Nicholas was scheduled for 26 December [O.S. 14 December] 1825 in Senate Square, Saint Petersburg.

In the midst of this confusing transition into Nicholas' reign, the Northern Society, a secret society of liberal revolutionaries, nobles, and military officials, organized a conspiracy to replace the Russian Empire's autocratic regime with a constitutional monarchy. To seize control of the government and implement a regime change, it sought to convince the military that Nicholas was usurping the throne from Konstantin. On 26 December, Northern Society members led a force of approximately 3,000 troops into Senate Square to prevent the loyalty-swearing ceremony and to rally additional soldiers and officers to their cause. This group of rebels, although disorganized due to indecision and dissension among its leaders, confronted troops loyal to Nicholas outside the Senate building in the presence of a large civilian crowd. A standoff ensued, during which Nicholas' envoy, Mikhail Miloradovich, was assassinated. The loyalists eventually opened fire with heavy artillery, scattering the rebels.

In the aftermath of the coup attempt, five rebellion leaders were sentenced to hanging; many other participants were imprisoned, or exiled to Siberia. The individuals who participated in the conspiracy and coup attempt became known as the Decembrists (Russian: декабристы, romanized: dekabristy).

== Union of Salvation and Union of Prosperity ==
At first, many officers were encouraged by Tsar Alexander I's early liberal reformation of Russian society and politics. Liberalism was encouraged on an official level, creating high expectations during the period of rapprochement between Napoleon and Alexander. The major advocate for reform in Alexander's regime was Count Mikhail Mikhailovich Speransky. During his early years in the regime, Speransky helped inspire the organization of the Ministry of the Interior, the reform of ecclesiastic education, and strengthening the government's role in the country's economic development. Speransky's role increased greatly in 1808. From then until 1812, when they feared him as a liberal similar to Napoleon and his invasion, Speransky developed plans for the reorganization of Russia's government. Because of increasing hostility, he was forced to flee into exile.

Returning from exile in 1819, Speransky was appointed as the governor of Siberia, with the task of reforming local government. In 1818, the tsar asked Count Nikolay Nikolayevich Novosiltsev to draw up a constitution. The abolition of serfdom in the Baltic provinces was instituted between 1816 and 1819. However, internal and external unrest, which the tsar believed stemmed from political liberalization, led to a series of repressions and a return to a former government of restraint and conservatism.

Meanwhile, the experiences of the Napoleonic Wars and realization of the suffering of peasant soldiers resulted in Decembrist officers and sympathizers being attracted to reform changes in society. They displayed their contempt of court by rejecting the court lifestyle, wearing their cavalry swords at balls (to indicate their unwillingness to dance), and committing themselves to academic study. These new practices captured the spirit of the times as a willingness by the Decembrists to embrace both the peasant (i.e., the fundamental Russian people) and ongoing reform movements from intellectuals abroad.

Pavel Pestel identified reasons for reform:

The desirability of granting freedom to the serfs was considered from the very beginning; for that purpose, a majority of the nobility was to be invited in order to petition the Emperor about it. This was later thought of on many occasions, but we soon came to realize that the nobility could not be persuaded. And as time went on we became even more convinced, when the Ukrainian nobility absolutely rejected a similar project of their military governor.

Historians have noted that the United States Declaration of Independence and the American Revolution may also have influenced Decembrists, as they did other nations. The constitution written by Nikita Muravyov was highly similar to the United States Constitution. But the Decembrists were against slavery in the United States. They worked to free any slaves and serfs from all countries in Russia immediately. Pestel and his followers opposed the United States' federal model in peaceful times as threatening to the would-be Russian/United Slavic federation; they only approved the US revolutionary model. While agreeing with Pestel that the American revolutionary model could be the best form for Russia, the Polish patriotic society would not agree to participate in establishing a federation. They wanted a United States-style republic or other state, with Lithuania, Belarus and Ukraine to be included in a unitary Poland (i.e., more or less the territory of the former Polish–Lithuanian Commonwealth), without any Russian involvement in the affairs of these territories.

In 1816, several officers of the Imperial Russian Guard founded a society known as the Union of Salvation, or of the Faithful and True Sons of the Fatherland. The society acquired a revolutionary cast after it was joined by the idealistic Pavel Pestel. The charter was similar to charters of the organizations of carbonari. Pestel was supported by Yakushkin when there were rumors that the emperor had intended to transfer the capital from Saint Petersburg to Warsaw, and to liberate all peasants without the consent of Russian landlords. They would not be able to influence a government based in Warsaw. Yakushkin intended to kill the emperor even before the revolution. When the society consisting of Russian landlords had refused to kill the emperor based on such rumors, Yakushkin left the society. The more liberal Mikhail Muravyov-Vilensky created a new charter similar to that of Tugendbund. It did not have revolutionary plans and the society was called the Union of Prosperity. It was still considered illegal and similar to masonic lodges. (The small Order of Russian knights, excepting its prominent member Alexander von Benckendorff, also joined the Union of Prosperity, together with the members of the Union of Salvation.)

After a mutiny in the Semenovsky Regiment in 1820, the society decided to suspend activity in 1821. Two groups, however, continued to function secretly: a Southern Society, based at Tulchin, a small garrison town in Ukraine, in which Pestel was the outstanding figure, and a Northern Society, based at Saint Petersburg, led by guard officers Nikita Muraviev, Prince S. P. Trubetskoy and Prince Eugene Obolensky. The political aims of the more moderate Northern Society were a British-style constitutional monarchy with a limited franchise. They envisioned that it could be replaced with a republic in the future but only according to the will of the people. They also believed there should be a legislative assembly and did not call for the execution of the imperial family. They supported the abolition of serfdom, according to the interests of Russian landlords, i.e. with land to be retained by landlords, in a style similar to the abolition of serfdom in Baltic provinces. They also supported equality before the law. The Southern Society, under Pestel's influence, was more radical and wanted to abolish the monarchy, establish a republic, similar to the Union of Salvation, and contrary to the Union of Salvation plans, to redistribute land, taking half into state ownership and dividing the rest among the peasants. The Society of United Slavs (also known as the Slavic Union – Pan-Slavism) was established in Novohrad-Volynsky (now Zviahel) in Ukraine in 1823. Its never-written program was similar to that of the Southern Society but the main emphasis was on the equal federation of Russia (including Ukraine), Poland, Moldavia (including Bessarabia) with the attachment of Wallachia, Transylvania, Hungary (including Slovakia, Slovenia, Vojvodina, the Carpatho-Ukraine aka Zakarpattia), Croatia, Serbia, Dalmatia, the Czech lands of Bohemia and Moravia, i.e. all Slavic and Vlach countries with the exception of Bulgaria and Macedonia, in the future. This society joined the Southern Society and adopted its program in exchange for the recognition of the Slavic federation zeal by the Southern society in September 1825.

== At Senate Square ==
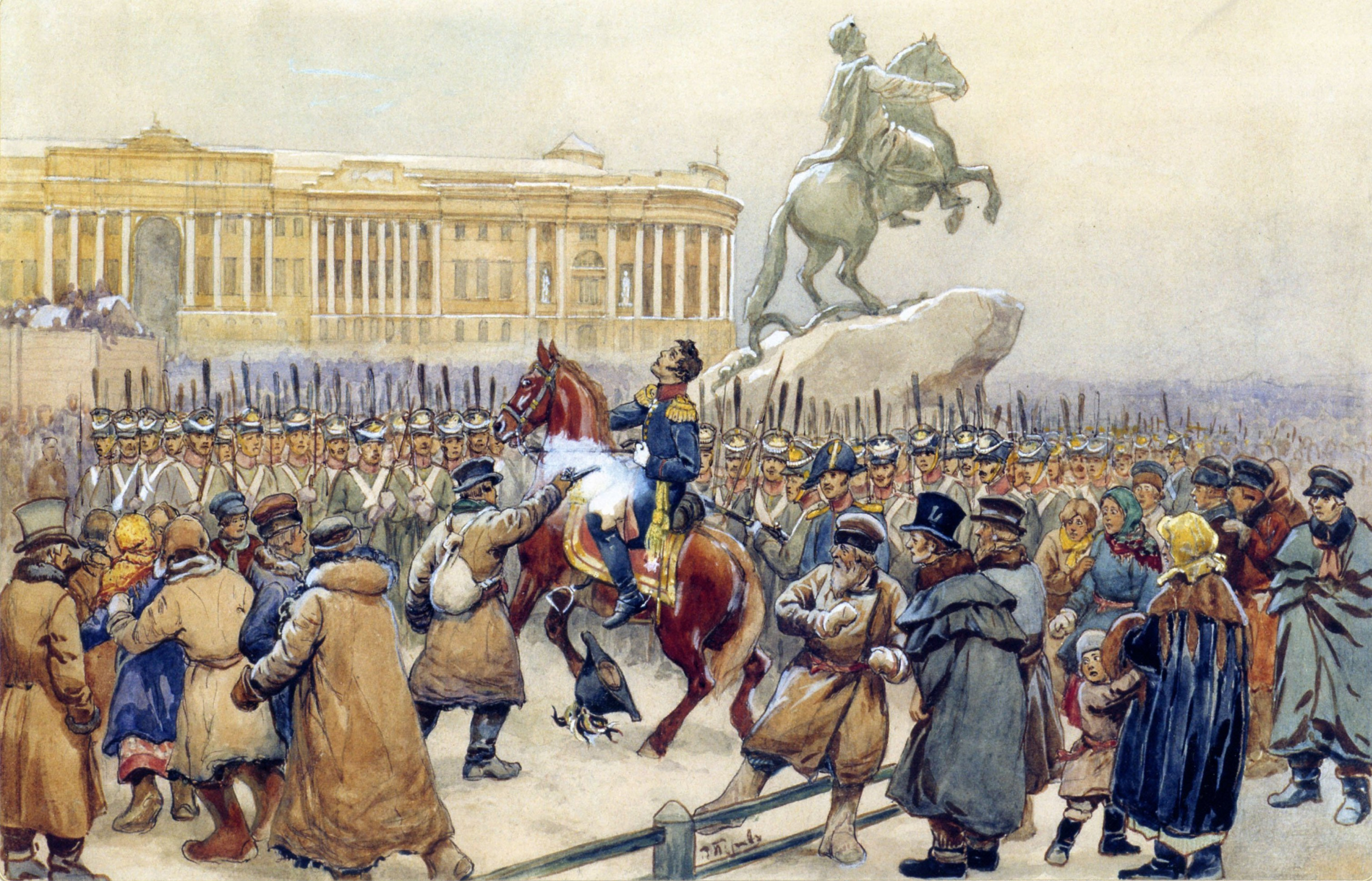
Decembrist revolt, a painting by Vasily Perov showing the killing of Mikhail Miloradovich by Pyotr Kakhovsky

When Emperor Alexander I died on 1 December [O.S. 19 November] 1825, the royal guards swore allegiance to the presumed successor, Alexander's brother Konstantin. When Konstantin made his renunciation public, and Nicholas stepped forward to assume the throne, the Northern Society acted. With the capital in temporary confusion, and one oath to Konstantin having already been sworn, the society scrambled in secret meetings to convince regimental leaders not to swear allegiance to Nicholas. These efforts culminated in the Decembrist revolt. The leaders of the society elected Prince Sergei Trubetskoy as interim ruler.

On the morning of 26 December [O.S. 14 December], a group of officers commanding about 3,000 men (elements of Life-Guards Moscow Regiment, Grenadier Life Guards Regiment, and Naval Equipage of the Guard) assembled in Senate Square, where they refused to swear allegiance to the new tsar, Nicholas I, proclaiming instead their loyalty to Konstantin. They expected to be joined by the rest of the troops stationed in Saint Petersburg, but they were disappointed. The revolt was hampered when it was deserted by its supposed leader Prince Trubetskoy. His second-in-command, Colonel Bulatov, also vanished from the scene. After a hurried consultation, the rebels appointed Prince Eugene Obolensky as a replacement leader.

For hours, there was a stand-off between the 3,000 rebels and the 9,000 loyal troops stationed outside the Senate building, with some desultory shooting from the rebel side. A vast crowd of civilian on-lookers began fraternizing with the rebels but did not join the action. Eventually, Nicholas (the new tsar) appeared in person at the square and sent Count Mikhail Miloradovich to parley with the rebels. Miloradovich was fatally shot in the back by Pyotr Kakhovsky while delivering a public address, then stabbed by Yevgeny Obolensky. At the same time, a rebelling squad of grenadiers, led by Lieutenant Nikolay Panov, entered the Winter Palace but failed to seize it and retreated.

After spending most of the day in fruitless attempts to parley with the rebel force, Nicholas ordered a cavalry charge by Her Sovereign Majesty Empress Maria Theodorovna's Chevalier Guard Regiment that slipped on the icy cobbles and retired in disorder. Eventually, at the end of the day, Nicholas ordered three artillery pieces to open fire with grapeshot ammunition to devastating effect. To avoid the slaughter, the rebels broke and ran. Some attempted to regroup on the frozen surface of the river Neva to the north. However, they were targeted by the artillery and suffered many casualties. As the ice was broken by the cannon fire, many sank. The revolt in the north came to an end. There was a rumor that during the nighttime, police and loyal army units were detached to clean the city and the Neva river, as many of the dead, dying, and wounded had been cast into it.

== In Ukraine ==
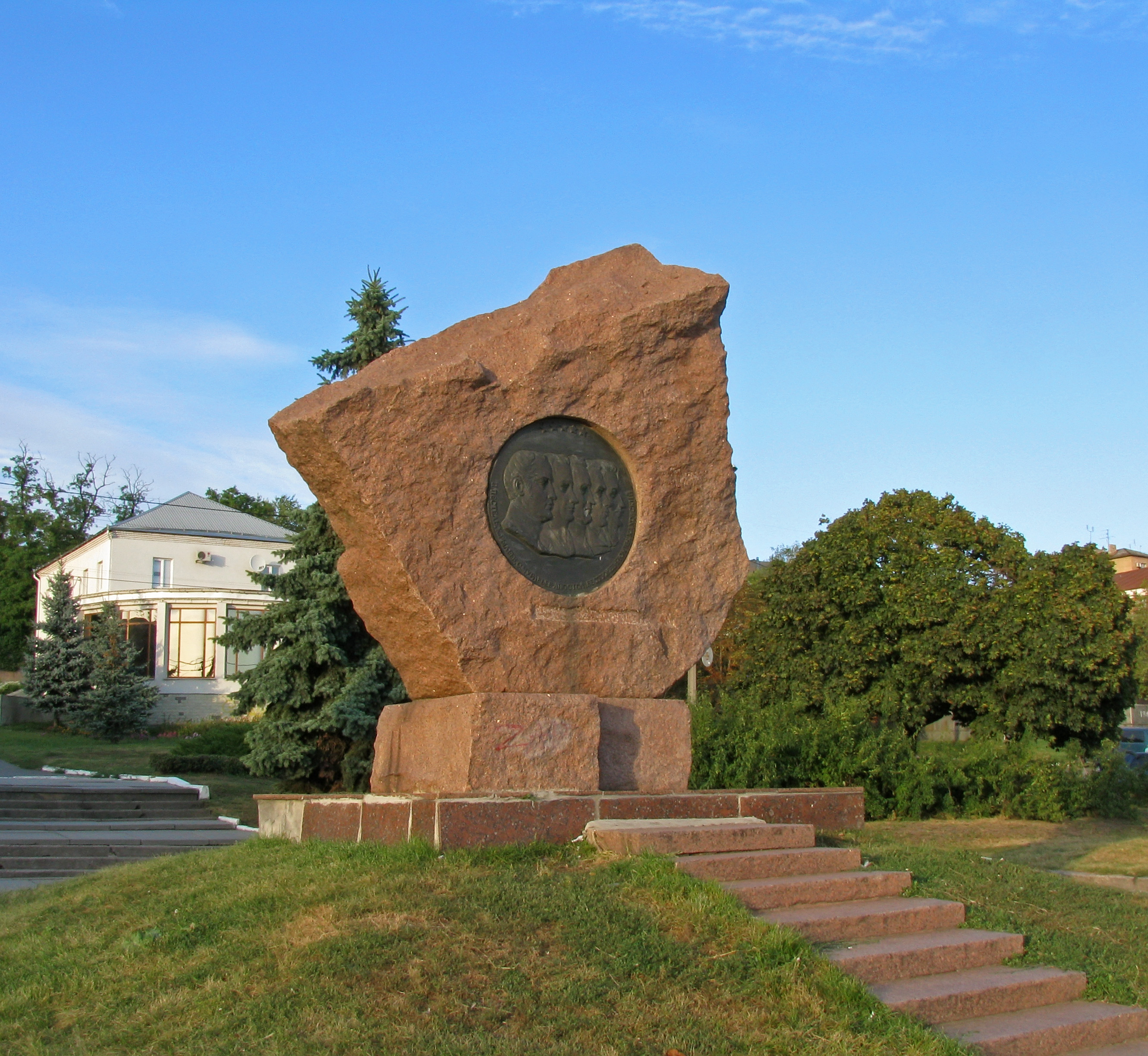
Monument dedicated to the uprising in Vasylkiv

The Southern Society, which included members of the Union of Welfare and the Society of United Slavs, was dominated by army officers and landowners from the regions of Left-bank and Southern Ukraine, Sloboda Ukraine and Volhynia. Unlike the Union of Welfare, which was indifferent to Ukrainian autonomist ideas, the latter organization promoted the vision of a democratic federation of Slavic peoples based on equal rights for each nation. Both groups merged into the Southern Society's Vasylkiv council in September 1825. A united action co-ordinated with the Northern Society was initially planned for 1826, but the death of Alexander I accelerated the process. On 10 January 1826 (O.S. 29 December 1825) Chernigov Regiment, headed by Sergey Muravyov-Apostol, rose up against the authorities, but in 5 days the revolt was defeated, with over 3,000 people connected to it being put under arrest. The leaders of the uprising were hanged and ordinary participants exiled to Siberia.

== Arrests and trial ==
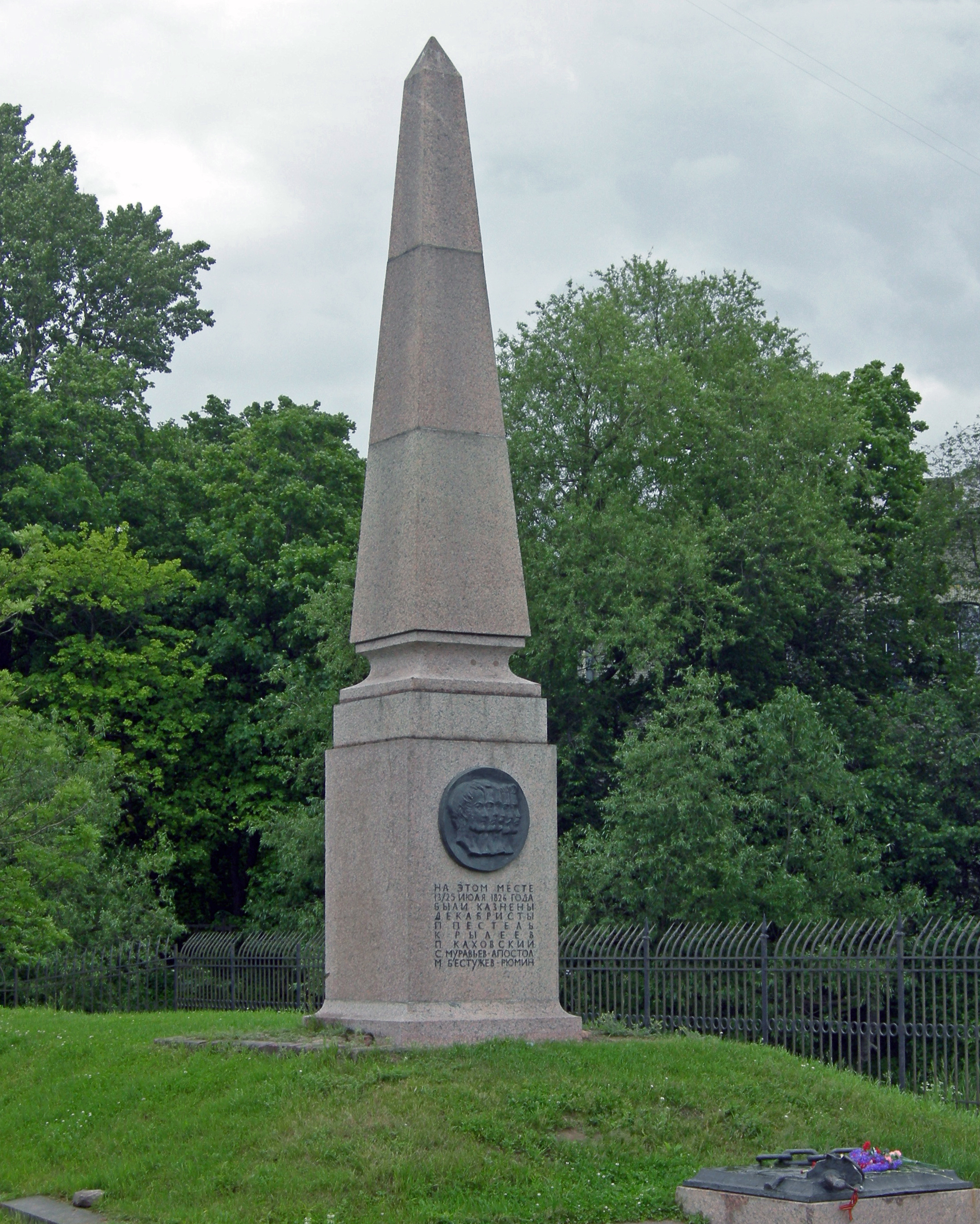
Monument to the Decembrists at the execution site in Saint Petersburg

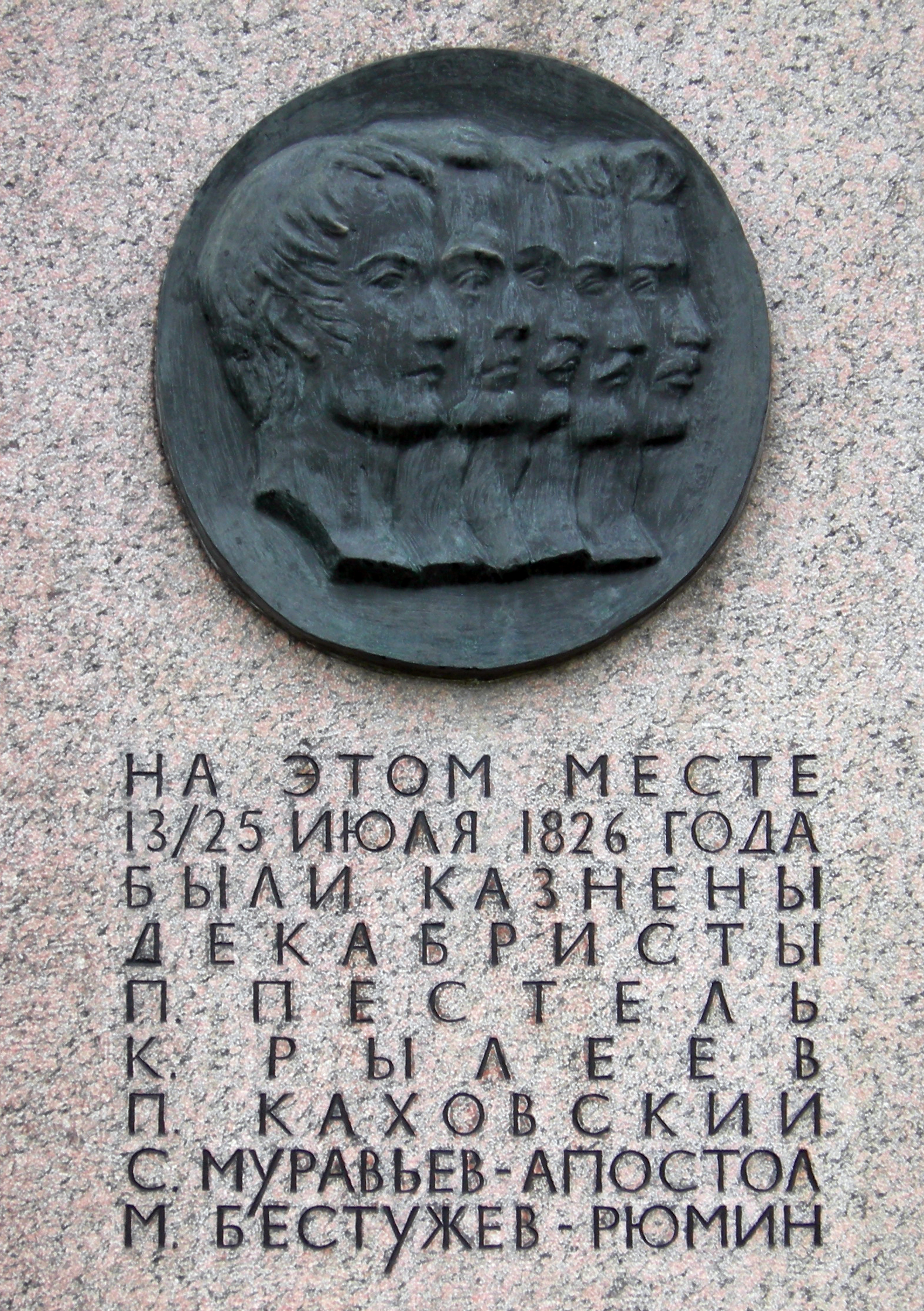
Inscription on the monument to the Decembrists at the execution site in Saint Petersburg. The text reads: На этом месте, 13/25 Июля 1826 года, были казнены Декабристы П. Пестель, К. Рылеев, П. Каховский, С. Муравьев-Апостол, М. Бестужев-Рюмин. (English: "At this place, 13/25 July 1826, were executed the Decembrists P. Pestel, K. Ryleyev, P. Kakhovsky, S. Muravyov-Apostol and M. Bestuzhev-Ryumin")

While the Northern Society scrambled in the days leading up to the revolt, the Southern Society (based in Tulchin) took a serious blow. The day before (25 December [O.S. 13 December]), acting on reports of treason, the police arrested Pavel Pestel. It took two weeks for the Southern Society to learn of the events in the capital. Meanwhile, other members of the leadership were arrested. The Southern Society, and a nationalistic group called the United Slavs, discussed revolt. When learning of the location of some of the arrested men, the United Slavs freed them by force. One of the freed men, Sergey Muravyov-Apostol, assumed leadership of the revolt. After converting the soldiers of Vasilkov to the cause, Muraviev-Apostol easily captured the city. The rebelling army was confronted by superior forces that were heavily armed with artillery loaded with grapeshot.

The following people were brought to trial: from the Northern Society - 61 people, from the Southern Society - 37 people, from the United Slavs - 23 people. The court sentenced: to death - five by quartering, 31 - by beheading, 17 - to cashiering, 16 - to lifelong exile with hard labor, 5 - to exile with hard labor for 10 years, 15 - to exile with hard labor for 6 years, 15 - to exile to a settlement, 3 - to deprivation of ranks, nobility and exile to Siberia, 1 to deprivation of ranks and nobility and demotion to soldier without seniority, 8 to deprivation of ranks with demotion to soldiers with seniority. Even before the verdict was pronounced, the court did not intend to apply any other punishment to the Decembrists than hanging.

About 120 members of secret societies were subjected to extrajudicial repressions (imprisonment in a fortress, demotion, transfer to the active army in the Caucasus, transfer under police supervision). The cases of the enlisted soldiers who participated in the uprising were examined by Special Commissions: 178 were sentenced to run the gauntlet, 23 were sentenced to other types of corporal punishment. The rest, about four thousand men, were formed into a combined guards regiment and sent to the Caucasian theater of military operations.

== Decembrists in Siberia ==
On 25 July [O.S. 13 July] 1826, the first party of Decembrist convicts began its exodus to Siberia. Among this group were Prince Trubetskoi, Prince Obolensky, Peter and Andrei Borisov, Prince Volkonsky, and Artamon Muraviev, all of them bound for the mines at Nerchinsk. The journey eastward was fraught with hardship, yet for some it offered refreshing changes in scenery and peoples following imprisonment. Decembrist Nikolay Vasil'yevich Basargin was unwell when he set out from Saint Petersburg, but he recovered his strength on the move; his memoirs depict the journey to Siberia in a cheerful light, full of praise for the "common people" and commanding landscapes.

Not all Decembrists could identify with Basargin's positive experience. Because of their lower social standing, "soldier-Decembrists" experienced the emperor's vengeance in full. Sentenced by court-martial, many of these "commoners" received thousands of lashes. Those that survived went to Siberia on foot, chained alongside common criminals.

Fifteen out of 124 Decembrists were convicted of "state-crimes" by the Supreme Criminal Court, and sentenced to "exile-to-settlement". These men were sent directly to isolated locales, such as Berezov, Narym, Surgut, Pelym, Irkutsk, Yakutsk, and Vilyuysk, among others. Few Russians inhabited these places: The populations consisted mainly of Siberian aborigines, such as Tunguses, Yakuts, Tatars, Ostyaks, Mongols, and Buryats.

Of all those exiled, the largest group of prisoners was sent to Chita, Zabaykalsky Krai, transferred three years later to Petrovsky Zavod, near Nerchinsk. This group, sentenced to hard labor, included principal leaders of the Decembrist movement as well as the members of the United Slavs. Siberian Governor-General Lavinsky argued that it was easiest to control a large, concentrated group of convicts, and Emperor Nicholas I pursued this policy in order to maximize surveillance and to limit revolutionaries' contact with local populations. Concentration facilitated the guarding of prisoners, but it also allowed the Decembrists to continue to exist as a community. This was especially true at Chita. The move to Petrovsky Zavod, however, forced Decembrists to divide into smaller groups; the new location was compartmentalized with an oppressive sense of order. Convicts could no longer congregate casually. Although nothing could destroy the Decembrists' conception of fraternity, Petrovsky Zavod forced them to live more private lives. Owing to a number of imperial sentence reductions, exiles started to complete their labor terms years ahead of schedule. The labor was of minimal travail; Stanislav Leparsky, commandant of Petrovsky Zavod, failed to enforce Decembrists' original labor sentences, and criminal convicts carried out much of the work in place of the revolutionaries. Most Decembrists left Petrovsky Zavod between 1835 and 1837, settling in or near Irkutsk, Minusinsk, Kurgan, Tobol'sk, Turinsk, and Yalutorovsk. Those Decembrists who had already lived in or visited Siberia, such as Dimitri Zavalishin, prospered upon leaving Petrovsky Zavod's confines, but most found it physically arduous and more psychologically unnerving than prison life.

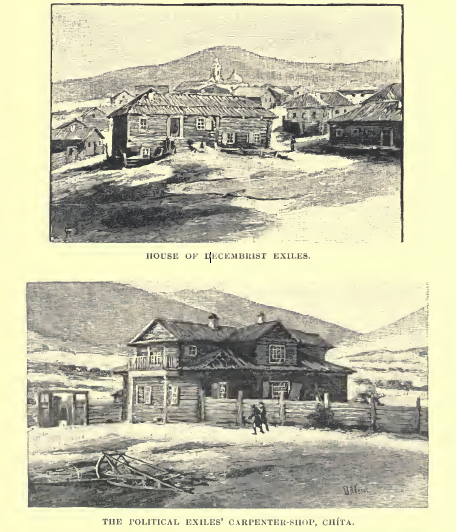
Decembrists in Chita, Zabaykalsky Krai, 1885

The Siberian population met the Decembrists with great hospitality. Natives played central roles in keeping lines of communication open among Decembrists, friends, and relatives. Most merchants and state employees were also sympathetic. To the masses, the Decembrist exiles were "generals who had refused to take the oath to Nicholas I." They were great figures that had suffered political persecution for their loyalty to the people. On the whole, indigenous Siberian populations greatly respected the Decembrists and were extremely hospitable in their reception of them.

Upon arrival at places of settlement, exiles had to comply with extensive regulations under a strict governmental regime. Local police watched, regulated, and notated every move that Decembrists attempted to make. Dimitri Zavalishin was thrown into prison for failing to remove his hat before a lieutenant. Not only were political and social activities carefully monitored and prevented, there was interference regarding religious convictions. Local clergy accused Prince Shakhovskoi of "heresy", due to his interest in natural sciences. Authorities investigated and restrained other Decembrists for not attending church. The regime thoroughly censored all correspondences, especially communication with relatives. Messages were scrupulously reviewed by both officials in Siberia and the Third Division of the political intelligence service at Saint Petersburg. This screening process necessitated dry, careful wording on the part of Decembrists. In the words of Bestuzhev, correspondence bore a "lifeless ... imprint of officiality." Under the settlement regime, allowances were extremely meager. Certain Decembrists, including the Volkonskys, the Murav'yovs, and the Trubetskoys, were rich, but the majority of exiles had no money, and were forced to live off a mere 15 desyatins (about 16 hectares) of land, the allotment granted to each settler. Decembrists, with little to no knowledge of the land, attempted to eke out a living on wretched soil with next to no equipment. Financial aid from relatives and wealthier comrades saved many; others perished.

Despite extensive restrictions, limitations, and hardships, Decembrists believed that they could improve their situation through personal initiative. A constant stream of petitions came out of Petrovsky Zavod addressed to General Leparskii and Emperor Nicholas I. Most of the petitions were written by Decembrists' wives who had cast aside social privileges and comfort to follow their husbands into exile. These wives joined under the leadership of Princess Mariia Volkonskaia, and by 1832, through relentless petitions, managed to secure for their men formal cancellation of labor requirements, and several privileges, including the right of husbands to live with their wives in privacy. Decembrists managed to gain transfers and allowances through persuasive petitions as well as through the intervention of family members. This process of petitioning, and the resultant concessions made by the tsar and officials, was and would continue to be a standard practice of political exiles in Siberia. The chain of bureaucratic procedures and orders linking Saint Petersburg to Siberian administration was often circumvented or ignored. These breaks in bureaucracy afforded exiles a small capacity for betterment and activism.

Wives of many Decembrists, as well as some nieces and sisters, followed their husbands into exile. The term Dekabristka ("Decembrist wife") is a Russian symbol of the devotion of a wife to her husband. Maria Volkonskaya, the wife of the Decembrist leader Sergei Volkonsky, notably followed her husband to his exile in Irkutsk. Despite the spartan conditions of this banishment, Sergei Volkonsky and his wife Maria took opportunities to celebrate the liberalising mode of their exile. Sergei took to wearing an untrimmed beard (rejecting Peter the Great's reforms and salon fashion), wearing peasant dress and socialising with many of his peasant associates with whom he worked the land at his farm in Urik. Maria, equally, established schools, a foundling hospital and a theater for the local population. Sergei returned after 30 years of his exile had elapsed, though his titles and land remained under royal possession. Other exiles preferred to remain in Siberia after their sentences were served, preferring its relative freedom to the stifling intrigues of Moscow and Saint Petersburg, and after years of exile there was not much for them to return to. Many Decembrists thrived in exile, in time becoming landowners and farmers. In later years, they became idols of the populist movement of the 1860s and the 1870s as the Decembrists' advocacy of reform (including the abolition of serfdom) won them many admirers, including the writer Leo Tolstoy.

During their time in exile, the Decembrists fundamentally influenced Siberian life. Their presence was most definitely felt culturally and economically, political activity being so far removed from the "pulse of national life" so as to be negligible. While in Petrovsky Zavod, Decembrists taught each other foreign languages, arts and crafts, and musical instruments. They established "academies" made up of libraries, schools, and symposia. In their settlements, Decembrists were fierce advocates of education, and founded many schools for natives, the first of which opened at Nerchinsk. Schools were also founded for women, and soon exceeded capacity. Decembrists contributed greatly to the field of agriculture, introducing previously unknown crops such as vegetables, tobacco, rye, buckwheat, and barley, and advanced agricultural methods such as hothouse cultivation. Trained doctors among the political exiles promoted and organized medical aid. The homes of prominent exiles like Prince Sergei Volkonsky and Prince Sergei Trubetskoi became social centers of their locales. All throughout Siberia, the Decembrists sparked an intellectual awakening: literary writings, propaganda, newspapers, and books from European Russia began to circulate the eastern provinces, the local population developing a capacity for critical political observation. The Decembrists even held a certain influence within Siberian administration; Dimitry Zavalishin played a critical role in developing and advocating Russian Far East policy. Although the Decembrists lived in isolation, their scholarly activities encompassed Siberia at large, including its culture, economy, administration, population, geography, botany, and ecology. Despite restricted circumstances, the Decembrists accomplished an extraordinary amount, and their work was deeply appreciated by Siberians.

On 26 August 1856, with the ascent of Alexander II to the throne, the Decembrists received amnesty, and their rights, privileges were restored. Their children obtained rights, privileges and even titles of their fathers (such as princes) even if their fathers' titles were not restored. However, not all chose to return to the West. Some were financially inhibited, others had no family, and many were weak with old age. To many, Siberia had become home. Those that did return to European Russia did so with enthusiasm for the enforcement of the Emancipation Reforms of 1861. The exile of the Decembrists led to the permanent implantation of an intelligentsia in Siberia. For the first time, a cultural, intellectual, and political elite came to Siberian society as permanent residents; they integrated with the country and participated alongside natives in its development.

== Assessment ==
With the failure of the Decembrists, Russia's autocracy would continue for almost a century, although serfdom would be officially abolished in 1861 and the parliaments in Russia and Finland would be established in 1905. Finland had a parliament since Alexander I, but the number of electors was limited. The Russian Constitution of 1905 was called "The basic laws" as the Decembrists had called it. Though defeated, the Decembrists did effect some change on the regime. Their dissatisfaction forced Nicholas I to turn his attention inward to address the issues of the empire. He included many Decembrists who had joined his forces on the Senate Square and did not ultimately support the revolt in spite of their participation in Decembrist meetings into his government (such as Benkendorf, appointed to supervise the human rights, Muraviev-Vilensky and others). In 1826, Speransky was appointed by Nicholas I to head the Second Section of His Imperial Majesty's Own Chancellery, a committee formed to codify Russian law. Under his leadership, the committee produced a publication of the complete collection of laws of the Russian Empire, containing 35,993 enactments. This codification called the "Full Collection of Laws" (Polnoye Sobraniye Zakonov) was presented to Nicholas I, and formed the basis for the "Collection of Laws of the Russian Empire" (Svod Zakonov Rossiskoy Imperii), the positive law valid for the Russian Empire. Speransky's liberal ideas were subsequently scrutinized and elaborated by Konstantin Kavelin and Boris Chicherin.

To some extent, the Decembrists were in the tradition of a long line of palace revolutionaries of 1725–1825 who wanted to place their candidate on the throne, but many Decembrists also wanted to implement either classical liberalism or a moderate conservatism contrary to the more Jacobin, centralizing program of Pavel Pestel or the pan-Slavic confederation-advocating revolutionaries of the "Society of United Slavs". The majority of Decembrists were not members of illegal organizations similar to the participants of palace revolutions. Some were members of the Union of Prosperity only, sympathetic to an official, pro-governmental fairly conservative program. But their revolt, unlike previous Romanov palace revolutions, has been considered the beginning of a revolutionary movement. The uprising was the first open breach between the government and reformist elements of the Russian nobility, which would subsequently widen.

=== Cultural Impact ===
Although the revolt was a proscribed topic during Nicholas' reign, Alexander Herzen placed the profiles of executed Decembrists on the cover of his radical periodical Polar Star. Alexander Pushkin addressed poems to his Decembrist friends; Nikolai Nekrasov, whose father served together with Decembrists in Ukraine, wrote a long poem about the Decembrist wives; and Leo Tolstoy started writing a novel on that liberal movement, which would later evolve into War and Peace. In the Soviet era Yuri Shaporin produced an opera entitled Dekabristi (The Decembrists), about the revolt, with the libretto written by Aleksey Nikolayevich Tolstoy, a descendant of Decembrist Nikolay Turgenev. It premiered at the Bolshoi Theatre on 23 June 1953. Fencing master and witness to the revolt, Augustin Grisier [fr] co-wrote with Alexandre Dumas a novel titled The Fencing Master, publishing it in 1840. In The Brothers Karamazov (1879), written by Fyodor Dostoyevsky, the Decembrist revolt is briefly mentioned in chapter 5, book II, part I, as a time reference mark. The American band the Decemberists borrow their name from the Decembrist revolt. Monuments to the revolt itself, as well as ones dedicated to prominent members who were exiled to Siberia, have been constructed. The revolt is portrayed in the 2019 Russian film Union of Salvation.

== Sources ==
- Gabayev, G. S. (1932, in Russian). Soldaty – uchastniki zagovora i vosstaniya dekabristov (Солдаты – участники заговора и восстания декабристов), in: Dekabristy i ih vremya (Декабристы и их время), vol. 4. Moscow: VOPSP.
- Mazour, Anatole (1937). The first Russian revolution, 1825: the Decembrist movement, its origins, development, and significance. Stanford University Press. Reissue: ISBN 978-0-8047-0081-8.
- Nechkina, Militsa (1984, in Russian). Dekabristy (Декабристы). Moscow: Nauka.
- Seton-Watson, Hugh (1988). The Russian empire, 1801–1917. Oxford University Press. ISBN 978-0-19-822152-4.
- Notes of Prince S.P. Trubetskoy (Saint Petersburg, 1906)

== See also ==
- Union of Salvation (film)
