= Governor of Trabzon =

Governor of a Turkish Province

Governor of Trabzon Trabzon Valiliği
- Logo of the Governor of Trabzon
- Incumbent; Tahir Sahin since January 15, 2026
- Appointer: President of Turkey; On the recommendation of the Turkish government
- Term length: No set term length or limit
- Inaugural holder: Nazım Bey; September 10, 1923
- Website: Office of the Governor

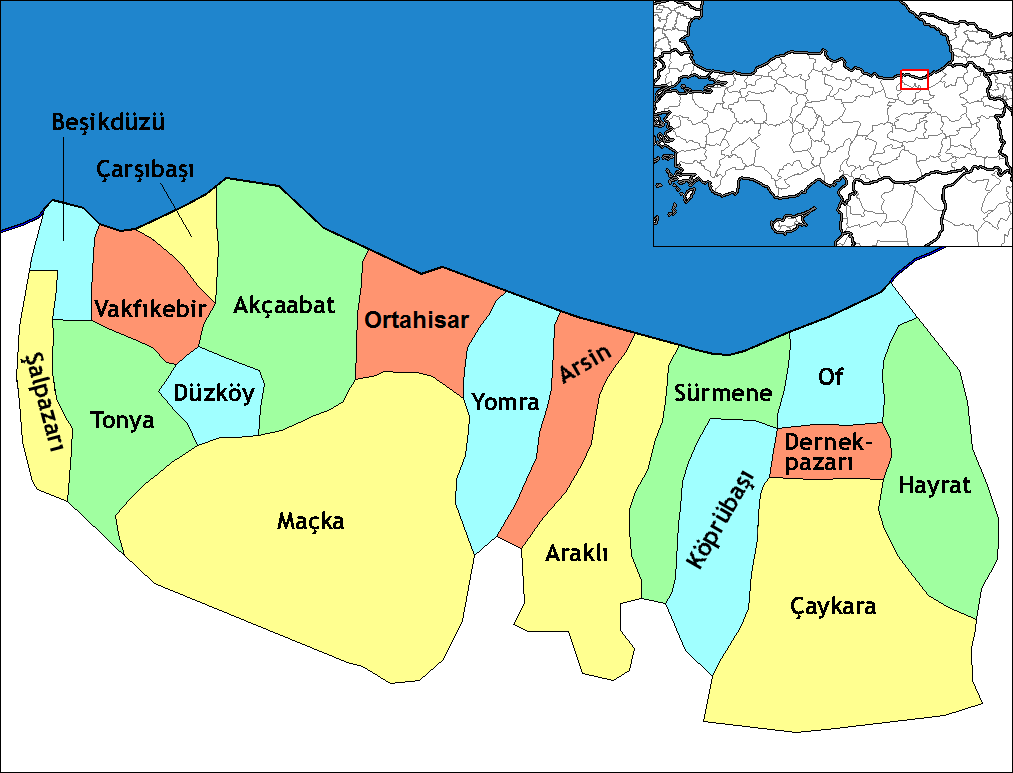
Map of the Province of Trabzon, showing the provincial districts.

The Governor of Trabzon (Turkish: Trabzon Valiliği) is the bureaucratic state official responsible for both national government and state affairs in the Province of Trabzon. Similar to the Governors of the 80 other Provinces of Turkey, the Governor of Trabzon is appointed by the Government of Turkey and is responsible for the implementation of government legislation within Trabzon. The Governor is also the most senior commander of both the Trabzon provincial police force and the Trabzon Gendarmerie.

== Appointment ==
The Governor of Trabzon is appointed by the President of Turkey, who confirms the appointment after recommendation from the Turkish Government. The Ministry of the Interior first considers and puts forward possible candidates for approval by the cabinet. The Governor of Trabzon is therefore not a directly elected position and instead functions as the most senior civil servant in the Province of Trabzon.

=== Term limits ===
The Governor is not limited by any term limits and does not serve for a set length of time. Instead, the Governor serves at the pleasure of the Government, which can appoint or reposition the Governor whenever it sees fit. Such decisions are again made by the cabinet of Turkey. The Governor of Trabzon, as a civil servant, may not have any close connections or prior experience in Trabzon Province. It is not unusual for Governors to alternate between several different Provinces during their bureaucratic career.

== Functions ==
The Governor of Trabzon has both bureaucratic functions and influence over local government. The main role of the Governor is to oversee the implementation of decisions by government ministries, constitutional requirements and legislation passed by Grand National Assembly within the provincial borders. The Governor also has the power to reassign, remove or appoint officials a certain number of public offices and has the right to alter the role of certain public institutions if they see fit. Governors are also the most senior public official within the Province, meaning that they preside over any public ceremonies or provincial celebrations being held due to a national holiday. As the commander of the provincial police and Gendarmerie forces, the Governor can also take decisions designed to limit civil disobedience and preserve public order. Although mayors of municipalities and councillors are elected during local elections, the Governor has the right to re-organise or to inspect the proceedings of local government despite being an unelected position.

== List of governors of Trabzon ==
- Nazım Bey (1923–1924)
- Ahmed Cemal Bey (1924)
- Sait Kıymaz Bey (1924–1928)
- Hilmi Bey (1928–1929)
- Ali Galip Pekel (1929–1931)
- Rıfat Danışman (1931–1937)
- Yahya Sezai Uzay (1937–1938)
- Refik Koraltan (1938–1939)
- Osman Sabri Adal (1939–1940)
- Faşih Atav (1940–1942)
- Ziya Kasnakoğlu (1942–1946)
- İhsan Olgun (1946–1948)
- Cavit Kınay (1948–1950)
- Ahmet Demir (1950–1951)
- Kamil Tuncel (1951–1953)
- Sait Kemalî Atay (1953–1954)
- Hadi Ömür (1954–1955)
- Eşref Ayhan (1955–1958)
- Niyazi Akı (1958–1960)
- Sadri Sarptır (1960)
- Vefa Poyraz (1960–1964)
- Celal Coşkun (1964–1966)
- Ali Rıza Yaradanakul (1966–1968)
- Mustafa Yörükoğlu (1968–1971)
- Sabahattin Çakmakoğlu (1971–1975)
- Fikret Turgut Sayın (1975–1978)
- Yılmaz Ergun (1978–1979)
- Kenan Güven (1979–1981)
- Hasan Bamyacı (1981–1984)
- M. İlyas Aksoy (1984–1988)
- Adnan Darendeliler (1988–1991)
- Sami Sönmez (1991–1992)
- Yusuf Ziya Göksu (1992–1993)
- Alaaddin Yüksel (1993–1996)
- İsmet Gürbüz Civelek (1996–1997)
- Adil Yazar (1997–2000)
- Aslan Yıldırım (2000–2003)
- Hüseyin Yavuzdemir (2003–2006)
- Nuri Okutan (2006–2009)
- Dr. Recep Kızılcık (2009–2013)
- Abdil Celil Öz (2013–2016)
- Yücel Yavuz (2016–2018)
- İsmail Ustaoğlu (2018–2023)
- Aziz Yıldırım (2023–2026)
- Tahir Şahin (2026–)

== See also ==
- Governor (Turkey)
- Trabzon Province
- Ministry of the Interior (Turkey)
