= Valea Argovei =

- Commune
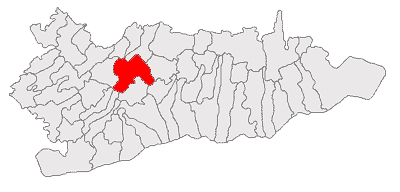
- Location in Călărași County

- Location in Romania
- Coordinates: 44°21′N 26°47′E
- Country: Romania
- County: Călărași

Government
  - Mayor (2024–2028): Costel Boitan (PSD)
- Area: 87.87 km^{2} (33.93 sq mi)
- Elevation: 45 m (148 ft)
- Population (2021-12-01): 2,314
  - Density: 26.33/km^{2} (68.21/sq mi)
- Time zone: UTC+02:00 (EET)
  - Summer (DST): UTC+03:00 (EEST)
- Postal code: 917275
- Area code: +(40) 242
- Vehicle reg.: CL
- Website: www.valea-argovei.ro

Valea Argovei is a commune in Călărași County, Muntenia, Romania. It is composed of five villages: Lunca, Ostrovu, Siliștea, Valea Argovei, and Vlădiceasca.

Historical population
Year	Pop.	±%
2002	2,792	—
2011	2,637	−5.6%
2021	2,314	−12.2%
Source: Census data

At the 2021 census, Valea Argovei had a population of 2,314.
