= Alexandra Kolosova =

Russian stage actress, translator and memoirist

- Александра Колосова
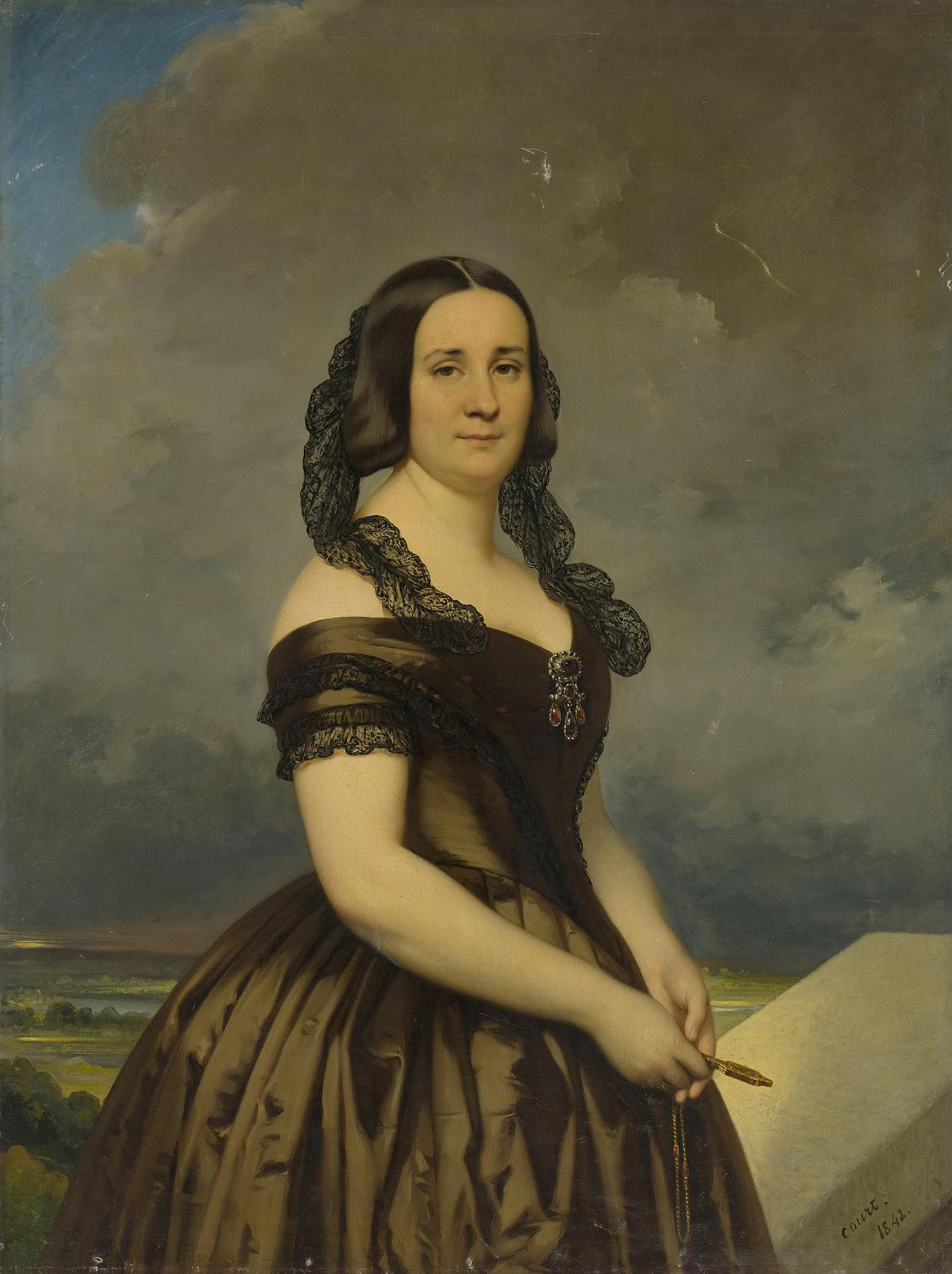
- Portrait by Joseph-Désiré Court, 1842
- Born: 16 February 1802; Saint Petersburg, Russian Empire
- Died: 19 March 1880 (aged 78); Saint Petersburg, Russian Empire
- Occupations: Actress; translator; memoirist
- Spouse: Vasily Karatygin

Alexandra Mikhailovna Kolosova (Russian: Александра Михайловна Колосова; 16 February 1802 – 19 March 1880) was a Russian stage actress, later translator and memoirist. She was the daughter of Eugenia Kolosova, a prima ballerina.

== Life ==
The first Russian theatre star to receive education in France, Alexandra became highly popular for her roles in Molière's comedies. As the Alexandrinsky Theatre was launched in 1832, Kolosova joined the troupe with her husband, actor Vasily Karatygin (whom she married in 1827) and for a decade the couple played there most of the leading roles.

After retirement Kolosova-Karatygina devoted herself to literature: she made several translations (including Der Glöckner von Notre Dame by Charlotte Birch-Pfeiffer, published in Russia as Esmeralda or Four Kinds of Love) and wrote Memoirs which appeared posthumously in 1881, in Russky Vestnik. In it she addressed among other issues that of her relationship with Alexander Pushkin, who first lampooned her in an epigram ("All things enchant us in Esther…", 1820), then sang her a paean in "An Epistle to Katenin" (1821).
