= Vasily Karatygin =

Russian actor (1802-1853)

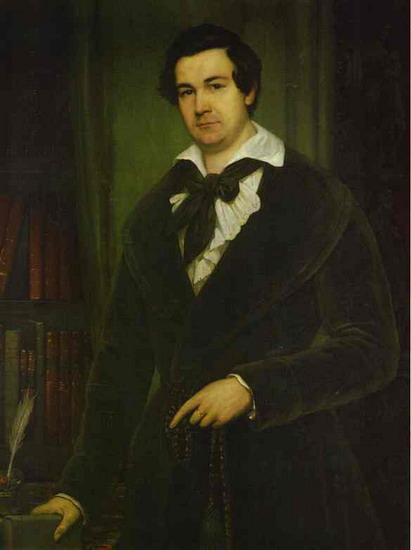
A portrait by Vasily Tropinin, 1842

Vasily Andreevich Karatygin (Russian: Василий Андреевич Каратыгин; 10 March [O.S. 26 February] 1802 – 25 March [O.S. 13 March] 1853) was a leading actor of Russian Romanticism.

Karatygin joined the Bolshoi Theatre in St Petersburg in 1820 and moved to the Alexandrine Theatre in 1832. He particularly excelled in the numerous productions of Shakespeare's and Schiller's plays, rivalling Moscow's Pavel Mochalov as the greatest Russian actor of his time. The two volumes of his Memoirs are invaluable.

Like other actors of his theatre, Karatygin was buried at the Smolensky Cemetery on Vasilievsky Island. His remains were later transferred to the national pantheon, the Alexander Nevsky Lavra. His wife Alexandra Kolosova was admired for her roles in Molière's comedies.
