= List of compositions by Mikhail Glinka =

Below is a sortable list of compositions by Mikhail Glinka. The works are categorized by genre, catalogue number, date of composition and titles.

Genre	IMG	Date	Russian title (original title)	English title	Scoring	Notes
Stage	23	1834–1836	Жизнь за царя	A Life for the Tsar		Opera in 5 acts; new version (1837) in 4 acts and epilogue; original title: Ivan Susanin
Stage		1836	Ария с хором для дамы К. А. Бахтурина «Молдаванка и цыганка, или Золото и кинжал»	Aria with Chorus for Konstantin Bakhturin's Play "The Moldavian Girl and the Gypsy Girl"		
Stage	33	1837–1842	Руслан и Людмила	Ruslan and Lyudmila		Opera in 5 acts after Alexander Pushkin; 2nd version 1846
Stage	31	1840	Музыка к трагедии Н. В. Кукольника «Князь Холмский»: 1. Увертюра; 2. Вступление ко второму действию 3. Еврейская песня 4. Песня Ильинишны; 5. Вступление к третьему действию 6. Сон Рахили; 7. Вступление к четвертому действию 8. Вступление к пятому действию	Prince Kholmsky: 1. Overture; 2. Entr'acte to Act II; 3. Hebrew Song; 4. Ilinishna's Song; 5. Entr'acte to Act III; 6. Rachel's Dream; 7. Entr'acte to Act IV; 8. Entr'acte to Act V	for orchestra: 3. for voice and orchestra 4. for voice and orchestra; 6. for voice and orchestra	Incidental music for the tragedy by Nestor Kukolnik
Stage		1841	Тарантелла	Tarantella	for narrator, chorus and orchestra	words by Ivan Myatlev (Иван Петрович Мятлев)
Orchestra		1822–1826?	Увертюра D-dur	Overture in D major	for orchestra	
Orchestra		1822–1826?	Увертюра g-moll	Overture in G minor	for orchestra	
Orchestra		1823?	Andante cantabile и Rondo	Andante cantabile and Rondo in D minor	for orchestra	
Orchestra		1824?	Симфония B-dur	Symphony in B♭ major	for orchestra	unfinished
Orchestra	39	1834	Симфония на две русские темы	Symphony on Two Russian Themes in D minor	for orchestra	unfinished; completed and orchestrated by Vissarion Shebalin
Orchestra		1839, 1856	Вальс-фантазия	Waltz-Fantasia in B minor	for orchestra	a.k.a. Valse-Fantaisie; original version for piano (1839); orchestrated in 1845 (lost); reorchestrated in 1856
Orchestra	20	1845	Испанская увертюра № 1 «Блестящее каприччио на тему Арагонской хоты»	Spanish Overture No. 1 "Capriccio Brilliante on the Jota Aragonesa"	for orchestra	
Orchestra	21	1848	Камаринская	Kamarinskaya, Scherzo / Fantasia on Two Russian Themes	for orchestra	arranged for piano 4-hands (1856)
Orchestra		1848	Recuerdos de Castilla	Recuerdos de Castilla	for orchestra	first version of Spanish Overture No. 2
Orchestra	37	1851	Испанская увертюра № 2 «Воспоминания о летней ночи в Мадриде»	Spanish Overture No. 2 "Recollection of a Summer Night in Madrid"	for orchestra	a.k.a. Souvenir d'une nuit d'été à Madrid
Orchestra		1855	Польский	Polonaise on a Spanish Bolero Theme in F major	for orchestra	
Orchestra			Concerto	Concerto in E♭ major	for orchestra	unfinished
Chamber music		1823?	Септет	Septet in E♭ major	for oboe (or clarinet), horn, bassoon, two violins (or violin and viola), cello and double bass	
Chamber music	71	1824	Квартет D-dur	String Quartet in D major	for 2 violins, viola and cello	
Chamber music	52	1825–1828	Соната для фортепьяно и альта	Sonata in D minor	for viola and piano	unfinished (2 movements only); movement II completed by Vadim Borisovsky in 1932 and Bart Berman in 1999
Chamber music	38	1830	Квартет F-dur	String Quartet in F major	for 2 violins, viola and cello	also arranged for piano 4-hands
Chamber music	6	1832	Блестящий дивертисмент на мотивы из оперы «Сомнамбула» В. Беллини	Divertimento Brilliante on Themes from Bellini's Opera "La sonnambula" in A♭ major	for piano with 2 violins, cello and double bass	also for 2 pianos 6-hands
Chamber music	15	1832	Большой секстет	Grand Sextet in E♭ major	for 2 violins, viola, cello, double bass and piano	a.k.a. Gran sestetto originale
Chamber music		1832	Серенада на некоторые мотивы из оперы «Анна Болейн» Г. Доницетти	Serenade on Themes from Donizetti's Opera "Anna Bolena" in E♭ major	for piano, harp, bassoon, horn, viola, cello and double bass	
Chamber music	41	1832	Патетическое трио	Trio Pathétique in D minor	for clarinet, bassoon and piano (or violin, cello and piano)	
Piano	47	1822	Вариации на тему Моцарта	Variations on a Theme from Mozart's Opera "Die Zauberflöte" in E♭ major	for piano or harp	
Piano		1824?	Вариации на собственную тему	Variations on an Original Theme in F major	for piano	
Piano	44	1826	Вариации на русскую песню «Среди долины ровныя»	Variations on a Russian Song "Among the Gentle Valleys" in A minor	for piano	
Piano		1826	Вариации на романс «Benedetta sia la madre»	Variations on the Song "Benedetta sia la madre" in E major	for piano	
Piano	48	1826 or 1827	Вариации на тему из оперы «Фаниска» Л. Керубини	Variations on a Theme from Cherubini's Opera "Faniska" in B♭ major	for piano	
Piano	3	1826?	Французская кадриль	5 New French Contradances	for piano	a.k.a. 5 Nouvelles quadrilles françaises
Piano		by 1828	Новые контрдансы	4 New Contradances	for piano	
Piano	5	by 1828	Котильон	Cotillon in B♭ major	for piano	
Piano		by 1828	Мазурка G-dur	Mazurka in G major	for piano	
Piano	26	1828	Ноктюрн	Nocturne in E♭ major	for piano or harp	
Piano	11	1829	Финская песна	Finnish Song in D major	for piano	
Piano	42	1829 or 1830	Кавалерийская рысь	Sabre Dance in C major	for piano 4-hands	a.k.a. Trot de cavalerie
Piano	42	1829 or 1830	Кавалерийская рысь	Sabre Dance in G major	for piano 4-hands	a.k.a. Trot de cavalerie
Piano		1830	Квартет F-dur	String Quartet in F major	for piano 4-hands	version for piano 4-hands
Piano	10	1831	Прощальный вальс	Farewell Waltz in G major	for piano	a.k.a. Valse d'adieux
Piano	32	1831	Блестящее рондо на темы из оперы «Монтекки и Капулетти» В. Беллини	Rondo Brillante on Themes from Bellini's Opera "I Capuleti e i Montecchi" in B♭ major	for piano	
Piano	46	1831	Блестящие вариации на тему из оперы «Анна Болейн» Г. Доницетти	Variations Brillante on a Theme from Donizetti's Opera "Anna Bolena" in A major	for piano	
Piano	51	1831	Вариации на две темы из балета «Киа-Кинг»	Variations on Two Themes from the Ballet "Chao-Kang" in D major	for piano	Chao-Kang, Ballet-Pantomime in 3 acts and epilogue (premiered 1834 at Salle Ventadour); choreography by Louis Henry; music by Luigi Carlini
Piano		1832	Блестящий дивертисмент на мотивы из оперы «Сомнамбула» В. Беллини	Divertimento Brilliante on Themes from Bellini's Opera "La sonnambula" in A♭ major	for 2 pianos 6-hands	original for piano with 2 violins, cello and double bass
Piano	18	1832	Экспромт в форме галопа на тему из оперы «Любовный напиток» Г. Доницетти	Impromptu-Galop on a Theme from Donizetti's Opera "L'elisir d'amore" in B♭ major	for piano 4-hands	a.k.a. Impromptu en Galop
Piano	49	1832	Вариации на тему из оперы «Монтекки и Капулетти» В. Беллини	Variations on a Theme from Bellini's Opera "I Capuleti e i Montecchi" in C major	for piano	
Piano	50	1833	Вариации на романс «Соловей» А. Алябьева	Variations on Alyabyev's Song "The Nightingale" in E minor	for piano	
Piano	13	1833 or 1834	Три фуги: 1. Трёхголосная фуга 2. Трёхголосная фуга 3. Четырехголосная фуга	3 Fugues: 1. 3-Part Fugue in E♭ major 2. 3-Part Fugue in A minor 3. 4-Part Fugue in D major	for piano	
Piano		1833 or 1834	Мазурка	Mazurka in A♭ major	for piano	
Piano		1833 or 1834	Мазурка	Mazurka in F major	for piano	
Piano	2	1834	Каприччио на русские темы	Capriccio on Russian Themes in A major	for piano 4-hands	
Piano		1834–1836?	Патриотическая песня	Patriotic Song in C major	for piano	a.k.a. Motif de chant national; music used as the national anthem of Russia (1990–2000)
Piano		1835?	Мазурка	Mazurka in F major	for piano	a.k.a. "Masurque dédiée à sa femme"
Piano	12	1838	Контрданс	5 Contradances	for piano	dated 1839 in some publications
Piano	53	1838	Вальс	Waltz in B♭ major	for piano	
Piano	53	1838	Вальс (Мелодический вальс)	Waltz in E♭ major	for piano	dated 1839 in some publications
Piano	14	1838 or 1839	Галопада	Galopade in E♭ major	for piano	
Piano	4	1839	Монастырка. Новый контрданс	La Conventine, 5 New Contradances	for piano	original for orchestra (lost)
Piano	34	1839	Разлука. Ноктюрн	La Séparation, Nocturne in F minor	for piano	
Piano		1839	Большой вальс	Grand Waltz in G major	for piano	a.k.a. Grande valse; original for orchestra (lost)
Piano	29	1839	Польский	Polonaise in E major	for piano	original for orchestra (lost)
Piano		1839	Le Regret, Ноктюрн	Le Regret, Nocturne	for piano	lost
Piano	43	1839	Вальс-фантазия	Waltz-Fantasia in B minor	for piano	a.k.a. Valse-Fantaisie
Piano		1840	Болеро («О, дева чидная моя»)	Bolero in D minor	for piano	
Piano	40	1843	Тарантелла на русскую тему	Tarantella on a Russian Folk Song in A minor	for piano	theme: «Во поле береза стояла» (In the Field There Stood a Birch Tree)
Piano		1843?	Мазурка	Mazurka in C minor	for piano	
Piano		1847	Привет отчизне: 1. Воспоминание о мазурке 2. Баркарола; 3. Молитва; 4. Вариации на шотландскую тему	A Greeting to My Native Land: 1. Souvenir d'une Mazurka in B♭ major 2. Barcarolle in G major 3. Prayer in A major 4. Variations on a Scottish Theme	for piano	4 Musical Essays; 2. Barcarolle 3. a.k.a. Prière; choral version (1855); after the poem by Mikhail Lermontov; 4. a.k.a. Thème écossais varié; theme: The Last Rose of Summer
Piano	28	1849	Полька	Polka in D minor	for piano	
Piano		1852	Мазурка	Mazurka in C major	for piano	
Piano	19	1852	Полька	Polka in B♭ major	for piano 4-hands	conceived in 1840
Piano	27	1854	Детская полька	Children's Polka in B♭ major	for piano	a.k.a. Polka Enfantine
Piano	22	1855?	Las Mollares. Андалузский танец	Las Mollares, Andalusian Dance in G major	for piano	
Piano			Leggieramente	Leggieramente in E major	for piano	published 1969
Piano			Мазурка	Mazurka in A minor	for piano	
Choral	1	1826	Пролог на кончину императора Александра I и восшествие на престол Николая I	Prologue on the Death of Emperor Alexander I and the Accession to the Throne of Nicholas I "Pleurons, pleurons sur le russie"	for tenor, mixed chorus, piano and double bass	Cantata; words by Olidor; Russian words by Ilya Fyodorovich Tiumenev (Илья Федорович Тюменев)
Choral			Русская песня	Russian Song	for voice, chorus and piano	words by Anton Delvig
Choral		1828	La notte omai s'appresso	La notte omai s'appresso	for soprano, alto, tenor, bass, mixed chorus and string orchestra	incomplete
Choral		1828 or 1834	A, ignobil core	A, ignobil core	for baritone, male chorus and orchestra	incomplete
Choral		1837	Херувимская	Cherubim's Song in C major	for mixed chorus	Biblical text
Choral		1837	Велик наш бог	Our God Is Great	for mixed chorus and orchestra	Polonaise; words by Vladimir Sollogub and Nikolai Khmelnitsky (Николай Иванович Хмельницкий)
Choral		1838	Гимн хозяину	Hymn to the Master	for tenor, mixed chorus and orchestra	words by Mykola Markevych
Choral		1847	Заздравная песня	Toasting Song	for voice and chorus	traditional words
Choral		1850	Прощальная песня для воспитанниц общества благородних девиц	Farewell Song for the Pupils of the Society of Genteel Maidens	for female chorus and orchestra	words by M. Timaev (М. Тимаев)
Choral		1854	Коса	The Scythe	for voice, mixed chorus and orchestra	words by Alexander Rimsky-Korsakov (Александр Яковлевич Римский-Корсаков)
Choral		1855	Молитва	Prayer	for voice, mixed chorus and orchestra	original for piano (1947); words by Mikhail Lermontov
Choral		1856?	Лектения первая	First Litany	for mixed chorus	
Vocal		1824	Моя арфа	My Harp	for voice and piano	words by Konstantin Bakhturin (Константин Александрович Бахтурин)
Vocal		1825	Не искушай меня без нужды	Do Not Tempt Me Needlessly	for voice and piano for 2 voices and piano	2 versions: for voice and piano, and for 2 voices and piano; words by Evgeny Baratynsky
Vocal		1826	Ах ты, душечка, красна девицка	Ah, My Sweet, Thou Art a Beautiful Maiden	for voice and piano	folk song
Vocal		1826	Утешение	Consolation	for voice and piano	2 versions; words by Vasily Zhukovsky
Vocal		1826	Бедный певец	The Poor Singer	for voice and piano	words by Vasily Zhukovsky
Vocal		1827	Горько, горько мне, красной девице	Bitter, Bitter It Is for Me	for voice and piano	words by Alexander Rimsky-Korsakov (Александр Яковлевич Римский-Корсаков)
Vocal		1827	Память сердца	Heart's Memory	for voice and piano	words by Konstantin Batyushkov
Vocal		1827	Я люблю, ты мне твердила	"I Love" Was Your Assurance	for voice and piano	words by Alexander Rimsky-Korsakov (Александр Яковлевич Римский-Корсаков); a.k.a. Le Baiser with French words (1854) by Prince Sergei Grigoryevich Golitsyn (Сергей Григорьевич Голицын)
Vocal		1827	Что, красотка молодая	Why Do You Cry, Young Beauty	for voice and piano	words by Anton Delvig
Vocal		1827 or 1828	Mio ben ricordati (Если вдруг средь радостей)		for alto, tenor and piano for soprano and piano	2 versions; Italian words by Metastasio; Russian words by Pyotr Ilyich Tchaikovsky
Vocal		1827 or 1828	Боже сил, во дни смятенья	O God, Preserve Our Strength in the Days of Confusion	for alto, tenor, bass and piano	Biblical text
Vocal		1827 or 1828	Один лишь миг	Pour un moment	for voice and piano	French and Russian words by Prince Sergei Grigoryevich Golitsyn (Сергей Григорьевич Голицын)
Vocal		1827 or 1828	Скажи зачем	Tell Me Why	for voice and piano	words by Prince Sergei Grigoryevich Golitsyn (Сергей Григорьевич Голицын)
Vocal		1828	Разочарование	Disenchantment	for voice and piano	2 versions; words by Prince Sergei Grigoryevich Golitsyn (Сергей Григорьевич Голицын)
Vocal		1828	Куда ни взгляну	Dovunque il guargo giro	for baritone and piano	Italian words by Metastasio; Russian words by Vsevolod Rozhdestvensky
Vocal		1828	Две итальянсие канцонетты: 1. Вспомни о Ирена; 2. К цитре	Due canzonette italiane: 1. Ah, rammenta, o belle Irene; 2. Alla cetra	for voice and piano	words by Metastasio
Vocal		1828	Смертный час настал нежданный	Ho perduto il mio tesoro	for tenor and piano	Italian words by Metastasio; Russian words by Pyotr Ilyich Tchaikovsky
Vocal		1828	Дедушка! – девицы раз мне говорили	The Maids Once Told Me, Grandfather	for voice and piano	2 versions; words by Anton Delvig
Vocal		1828	Тоска мне больно сердце жмет	Mi sento il cor trafiggere	for tenor and piano	Italian words by Metastasio; Russian words by Pyotr Ilyich Tchaikovsky
Vocal		1828	О, Дафна моя прекрасная	O Dafni che di quest'anima amabile diletto	for soprano and piano	Russian words by Vsevolod Rozhdestvensky
Vocal		1828	Ах ты, ночь ли, ноченька	O Thou Black Night	for voice and piano	2 versions; words by Anton Delvig
Vocal		1828	Волей богов я знаю	Pensa que questo instante	for alto and piano	Italian words by Metastasio; Russian words by Vsevolod Rozhdestvensky
Vocal		1828	Как в вольных просторах	Piangendo ancora rinascer suole	for soprano and piano	Italian words by Metastasio; Russian words by Vsevolod Rozhdestvensky
Vocal		1828	Молитва «С небеси услыши» «На уснувший мир нисходит тишь ночная»	Prayer	for soprano, alto, tenor, bass and piano	Quartet in B♭ major
Vocal		1828	Я в волшебном сновиденье	Pur nel sonno	for soprano and piano	Italian words by Metastasio; Russian words by Pyotr Ilyich Tchaikovsky
Vocal		1828	Забуду ль я...	Shall I Forget...	for voice and piano	words by Prince Sergei Grigoryevich Golitsyn (Сергей Григорьевич Голицын)
Vocal		1828	Не пой, красавица, при мне	Sing Not, Thou Beauty, in My Presence	for voice and piano	words by Alexander Pushkin
Vocal		1828	Помни, что счастье на свете призрак мгновенный	Sogna chi crede d'esser felice	for alto, 2 tenors, bass and string orchestra	Quartet; Russian translation by Vsevolod Rozhdestvensky
Vocal		1828	Скоро узы Гименея	Tu sei figlia	for soprano and piano	Italian words by Metastasio; Russian words by Pyotr Ilyich Tchaikovsky
Vocal		1828 or 1829	Come di gloria al nome	Come di gloria al nome	for soprano, alto, tenor, bass and string orchestra	
Vocal		1829	Голос с того света	A Voice from the Other World	for voice and piano	words by Friedrich Schiller in translation by Vasily Zhukovsky
Vocal		1829	Ночь осенняя	O Gentle Autumn Night	for voice and piano	words by Alexander Rimsky-Korsakov (Александр Яковлевич Римский-Корсаков)
Vocal		1829 or 1830	Семь этюдов для контральто	7 Studies	for alto and piano	
Vocal		1832	Пробедитель	The Conqueror	for voice and piano	words by Ludwig Uhland in translation by Vasily Zhukovsky
Vocal		1832	Желание	Il desiderio	for voice and piano	words by Felice Romani
Vocal		1832	Ариа для сопрано «В суде неправом»	L'iniquo voto	for soprano and piano	words by Pini
Vocal		1832	Венецианская ночь	Venetian Night	for voice and piano	Fantasia; 2 versions; words by Ivan Kozlov
Vocal		1833	Шесть этюдов	6 Studies	for soprano and piano	
Vocal		1834	Дубрава шумит	The Leafy Grove Howls	for voice and piano	words by Friedrich Schiller in translation by Vasily Zhukovsky
Vocal		1834	Не говори: любовь пройдет	Say Not That Love Will Pass	for voice and piano	words by Anton Delvig
Vocal		1834, 1855	Не называй ее небесной	Call Her Not Heavenly	for voice and piano	orchestrated 1855; words by Nikolai Filippovich Pavlov (Николай Филиппович Павлов)
Vocal		1834	Я здесь, Инезилья	I Am Here, Inezilla	for voice and piano	words by Alexander Pushkin after Barry Cornwall
Vocal		1834	Только узнал я тебя	I Had But Recognized You	for voice and piano	words by Anton Delvig
Vocal		1835 or 1836	Упражнения для усовершенствования голоса	Exercises for Smoothing and Perfecting the Voice	for voice and piano	
Vocal		1836		Comic Canon a 4	for voice and piano	composed in collaboration with Vladimir Odoevsky; words by Alexander Pushkin, Vasily Zhukovsky, Pyotr Vyazemsky, M. Wielhorski
Vocal		1836	Ночной смотр	The Night Review	for voice and piano	Fantasia; orchestrated c.1836–1840; reorchestrated 1855; words by Vasily Zhukovsky
Vocal		1837	Где наша роза	Where Is Our Rose?	for voice and piano	3 versions; words by Alexander Pushkin
Vocal		1837	Станцы. Вот место тайного свиданья	Stanzas: This Secret Meeting Place	for voice and piano	words by Nestor Kukolnik
Vocal		1837 or 1838	Вы не придете вновь	Will You Not Return	for 2 sopranos and piano	Duettino; words by the composer
Vocal		1838	Сомнение	Doubt	for voice and piano	words by Nestor Kukolnik
Vocal		1838	В крови горит огонь желанья	The Fire of Longing Burns in My Heart	for voice and piano	words by Alexander Pushkin
Vocal		1838	Ночной зефир	The Night Zephir	for voice and piano	words by Alexander Pushkin
Vocal		1838	Не щебечи, соловейку	Sing Not, O Nightingale	for voice and piano	Ukrainian Song; words by Victor Zabella (Виктор Николаевич Забелла)
Vocal		1838	Гуде вітер вельми в полі...	The Wind Blows	for voice and piano	Ukrainian Song; words by Victor Zabella (Виктор Николаевич Забелла)
Vocal		1839	Зацветет черемуха	The Cherry Tree Is Blooming	for voice and piano	words by Yevdokiya Rostopchina
Vocal		1839	Признание	Declaration	for voice and piano	words by Alexander Pushkin
Vocal		1839	Если встречусь с тобой	If I Shall Meet You	for voice and piano	words by Aleksey Koltsov
Vocal		1839	Свадебная песня «Дивный терем стоит»	Wedding Song	for voice and piano	a.k.a. The North Star; words by Yevdokiya Rostopchina
Vocal		1840	Прощальной песни воспитанниц Екатерининского института при их выпуске	Farewell Song of Pupils of the Yekaterinsky Institute	for voice and piano	words by Platon Obodovsky (Платон Григорьевич Ободовский)
Vocal	9	1840	Прощание с Петрбургом: 1. Романс из поэмы «Давид Риццио»; 2. Еврейская песня 3. Болеро; 4. Давно ли роскошно ты розой цвела...; 5. Колыбельная песня 6. Попутная песня 7. Стой, мой верный, бурный конь... Фантазия; 8. Баркарола «Уснули голубые...»; 9. Virtus antiqua (Рыцарский романс); 10. Жаворонок; 11. К молли. Романс из романа «Бюргер»; 12. Прощальная песня	A Farewell to Saint Petersburg: 1. Romance; 2. Hebrew Song; 3. Bolero; 4. Cavatina; 5. Cradle Song; 6. Travelling Song; 7. Fantasia; 8. Barcarolle; 9. Virtus antiqua 10. The Lark; 11. To Molly; 12. Song of Farewell	for voice and piano	words by Nestor Kukolnik: 2. from Prince Kholmsky; 3. original for piano; 5. also for voice and string orchestra; 11. based on Le regret for piano 12. for voice, male chorus and piano
Vocal		1840	Как сладко с тобою мне быть	How Sweet It Is to Be with You	for voice and piano	words by Pyotr Ryndin (Петр Рындин)
Vocal		1840	Я помню чудное мгновенье	I Recall a Wonderful Moment	for voice and piano	words by Alexander Pushkin
Vocal		1840 or 1841	Четыре эксерсиса	4 Exercises	for voice and piano	
Vocal		1842	Люблю тебя, милая роза	I Love You, Dear Rose	for voice and piano	words by I. Samarin (И. Самарин)
Vocal		1843	К ней	To Her	for voice and piano	words by Adam Mickiewicz in translation by Prince Sergei Grigoryevich Golitsyn (Сергей Григорьевич Голицын)
Vocal		1847	Милочка	Darling	for voice and piano	words by anonymous
Vocal		1847	Ты скоро меня позабудешь	Soon You Will Forget Me	for voice and piano	orchestrated 1955; words by Yulia Zhadovskaya
Vocal		1847	Песнь Маргариты	Meine Ruh' ist hin	for voice and piano	words from Goethe's Faust in translation by Eduard Ivanovich Guber (Эдуард Иванович Губер)
Vocal		1848	Заздравный кубок	The Toasting Cup	for voice and piano	words by Alexander Pushkin
Vocal		1848	Слышу ли голос твой	When I Hear Your Voice	for voice and piano	words by Mikhail Lermontov
Vocal		1849	Адель	Adèle	for voice and piano	words by Alexander Pushkin
Vocal		1849	Rozmowa. Fantazya di spiewu	Conversation	for voice and piano	words by Adam Mickiewicz
Vocal		1849	Мери	Mary	for voice and piano	words by Alexander Pushkin after Barry Cornwall
Vocal		1850	Финский залив	The Gulf of Finland	for voice and piano	a.k.a. Palermo; words by Platon Obodovsky (Платон Григорьевич Ободовский)
Vocal		1856	Ах, когда б я прежде знала...	Oh, If I Had Known...	for voice and piano	words by Ivan Dmitriev
Vocal		1856	Не говори, что сердцу больно	Say Not That It Grieves the Heart	for voice and piano	words by Nikolai Filippovich Pavlov (Николай Филиппович Павлов)
Vocal		1856?	Да исправиця молитва моя	Let My Prayer Be Fulfilled	for 2 tenors and baritone	
Vocal		1856 or 1857	Гимн воскресения	Resurrection Hymn	for 2 tenors and baritone	
Vocal		1856 or 1857	Школа пения	School of Singing		

== Sources ==
- Shebalin, V., Pavchinsky, S. editors, et al. M. I. Glinka: Complete Collection of Works (М. И. Глинка: Полное Собрание Сочинений), Izdatelstvo Muzyka, Moscow (1955–1973).
- Campbell, Stuart (2001). "Glinka, Mikhail Ivanovich". Grove Music Online (8th ed.). Oxford University Press. doi:10.1093/gmo/9781561592630.article.11279. ISBN 978-1-56159-263-0. (subscription, Wikilibrary access, or UK public library membership required)
