= Dmitry Donskoy (opera) =

1852 opera written by Anton Rubinstein

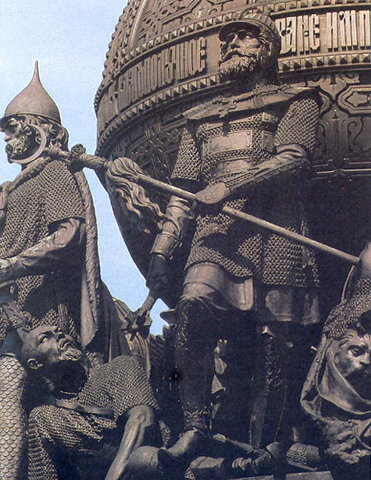
Mamai at the feet of Dmitry Donskoi, Millennium Monument in Novgorod

Dmitry Donskoy (Russian: Дмитрий Донской), also known as The Battle of Kulikovo (Russian: Куликовская битва) was the first opera written by Anton Rubinstein. It has three acts and a libretto by Count Vladimir Sollogub and Vladimir Zotov, based on a drama by Vladislav Ozerov. First performed on April 18, 1852 at the Bolshoi Opera House, and then followed by three more performances, the opera, apart from its overture, is now lost.

== Background ==
Rubinstein asked for a libretto from Sollogub, who had also worked on Glinka's successful opera A Life for the Tsar, on what was ostensibly also a nationalist theme, the success of Dmitry Donskoy at the Battle of Kulikovo (1380) against the commander of the Tatar Golden Horde, Mamai. However he ignored the historic elements in favour of a fairly routine operatic love story. Sollogub, the writer for Mikhail Glinka's A Life for the Tsar, by April 1849, was completed with the libretto.

The overture was completed first and was performed at a concert in 1850. But Rubinstein faced trouble with the Russian censors, who forbade any stage presentation of Donskoy himself singing. In June, Rubenstein began work on the first scenes of the opera, specifically the Tartar scene where Russia is freed from the Mongol invasion of Kievan Rus' (or the "Tartar Yoke"). During 1850, Rubenstein had hoped to have the opera performed in time for Easter of 1851. However, the official censors requested that Prince Donskoy should not sing as it was not proper for dignitaries to sing on stage.

Eventually the score was approved in March 1851 and the first performance took place on 18 April 1852 at the Bolshoi Kamenny Theatre in St. Petersburg which was met with high regards by the audience. The censors however insisted that the title be rendered as The Battle of Kulikovo. Rubinstein wrote to his mother 'This is not so terrible. The public will gradually find out what the real names are'. The composer was pleased by the reception, although he complained about the quality of the singers: nonetheless he reported that 'The success was enthusiastic!' The next performances from April 18 to 27 proved to be less favorable for the opera and while the event was considered historic, the opera itself was considered artistically lacking in poetic artistry yet strong in its musical drama. Alexander Serov's comments on the opera allude to the hubris of young composers taking on complex subject matter, Rubenstein's ineffective expression of the Russian style and national spirit, as well as his integration of different musical styles, and his overly academic compositional language. These critiques of Rubenstein would be carried through with the emergence of The Five and the tension between the Russian Musical Society and the Free Music School.

Despite the negative reaction from Serov, Grand Duchess Elena Pavlovna expressed her fondness of the opera to Rubenstein.

The opera had only four performances and does not seem to have been revived. Only the score of the overture has survived, together with one aria and some vocal parts in archives in St. Petersburg.

== Synopsis ==
Donskoy wins the hand of Ksenia over his rival Tverskoy when he leads the victory over Mamai in the Battle of Kulikovo.

== Roles ==
| Role | Voice type | Premiere cast, 30 April [O.S. 18 April] 1852 (Conductor: ) |
|---|---|---|
| Dmitry Donskoy | bass | Osip Petrov |
| Tverskoy | tenor | Lev Leonov |
| Ksenia | soprano | Maria Stepanova |
| Dervish | | Pavel Bulakhov |
| Mamai | baritone | Semen Hulak-Artemovsky |
