= Georgii Nelepp =

Soviet singer and opera singer (1904-1957)

- Георгий Нэлепп
- Born: Georgii Mikhailovich Nelepp; 20 April 1904; Bobruiki, Kozeletsky Uyezd, Chernihiv Governorate, Russian Empire
- Died: 18 June 1957 (aged 53); Moscow, Soviet Union
- Occupation: Opera singer (tenor)

Georgii Mikhailovich Nelepp (Russian: Георгий Михайлович Нэлепп; 20 April 1904 – 18 June 1957) was a Soviet and Russian opera singer.

From 1930 to 1957, Nelepp performed dramatic tenor parts at the Kirov Theatre in St. Petersburg and the Bolshoi Theatre in Moscow. In Nelepp's entry in Great Soviet Encyclopedia, V. I. Zubarin writes, "One of the best Soviet opera singers, Nelepp was a highly skilled actor. He possessed a sonorous, soft voice capable of rich timbre. He was noted for the richness of his characterizations and for the austerity and nobility of his artistic form." In notes for a CD featuring Nelepp and three other Bolshoi tenors (Ivan Kozlovsky, Georgy Vinogradov, and Sergei Lemeshev), Charles Haynes calls Nelepp "the most exciting" of them, explaining that his "voice and artistry are entirely different from those of his three colleagues: the voice itself has a compelling 'ring' to it and there is a sense of urgency about his performances."

Nelepp's life trajectory from farmhand to celebrated opera singer was marked by two youthful choices—joining the Russian Revolution as a member of the Red Army and successfully auditioning for a place in the opera-singing course at the Leningrad Conservatory despite having no previous musical training.

== Life ==
Of Cossack ancestry, Nelepp was born in Bobruiki, Chernihiv Governorate in today's Ukraine. A grandmother of Polish nobility and an uncle employed by the railroad kept the family from hardship. However, both died when Georgii was a boy, and he was set to work to support the family on a landlord's farm. While herding cattle, he would sing in the open fields.

When the Russian Revolution began, Georgii left his chores and joined the Red Army. A cavalryman, he was assigned to units in Ukraine that punished deserters and collected food taxes, i.e., confiscated grain from peasants. According to Russian historian Suzanne Ament, both assignments would likely have exposed him to violence. Deserters and uncooperative peasants alike were shot.

For the rest of his life, Nelepp belonged to the Communist Party and served in various capacities, e.g., as Party Secretary of the Bolshoi Theatre and, beginning in 1954, on the Stalin Prize Committee. He enjoyed the privileges of Party membership, such as owning a car in which he took family and friends fishing.

Nelepp has been criticized for denouncing persons to the Stalin regime. In her autobiography, soprano Galina Vishnevskaya, his co-star in Fidelio, described an incident in which a woman came to the Bolshoi Theater and spat on Nelepp, claiming he had destroyed her family. His article in the Encyclopaedia Universalis likewise presents Nelepp as a political informant.

As a young soldier in Ukraine, Nelepp met and married his wife Nadezhda Feodorovna Gregorieva. Later, he would refer to her as his muse. She sacrificed her own musical career for his.

As a member of the Young Communist League, Nelepp obtained transfer to Leningrad, where he entered a military topographical school, graduating in 1927. Although he had no formal music education, he nevertheless enjoyed playing the violin and harmonica, and above all singing.

In 1927, his wife—who was studying to teach music—along with some of his friends persuaded him to audition for admission to the Leningrad Conservatory. Hearing Nelepp sing, director Alexander Glazunov appraised the untrained tenor's potential as follows: "Superb material (dramatic tenor). His voice is fully blended throughout the registers, metallic, exceptionally beautiful timbre, natural resonance, pure intonation, good musical and rhythmical ability, appearance on stage: promising."

Competing with a thousand applicants for admission to the Conservatory, Nelepp won one of seven openings. He completed a five-year Conservatory program in three years and was offered a contract at Leningrad's premiere Kirov Theater. His teacher Joseph Tomars trained him to sing both lyric and dramatic tenor parts. He debuted in the lyric role of Lensky in Tchaikovsky's Eugene Onegin. Writing about the performance ten years later, E. Ol’khovskii described Nelepp's characterization of the romantic hero, which played upon Lensky's weakness, femininity, and hypersensitivity. It won "the blessing of the audience."

Thus, critic Ivan Sollertinsky predicted Nelepp would be a world class opera star. Renowned Russian tenor Leonid Sobinov commented on the performance: "Georgy Nelepp possesses superb vocal material, a beautiful timbre and a sure instinct for dramatic accentuation. I am fully convinced that he is by far the most promising newcomer in sight."

In 1939 Nelepp "was deemed a sensation" and rose to stardom, according to Malisch, in the role of Matiushenko in the world premiere of Oles' Chishko's (Battleship Potemkin. In the years to come, Nelepp would collaborate with composers of Soviet operas, who valued his real experience of the conditions they were theatrically depicting.

In 1944, Nelepp left the Kirov to join the Bolshoi Theatre in Moscow, where he performed until his death from heart disease in 1957 at the age of 53.

== Artistic achievement ==
With a repertoire of 50 roles, Nelepp sang the dramatic tenor parts in classical Russian operas including the title role in Sadko, the Pretender in Boris Godunov, Gherman in Pique Dame, Czarevitch Guidon in The Tale of Tsar Saltan, Sobinin in Ivan Susanin, Yuri in The Enchantress, Finn in Ruslan and Ludmilla, Tucha in The Maid of Pskov, Toropka in Askold's Grave, Jontek in Halka, Jenik in The Bartered Bride, Andrey in Mazeppa, Vakula in The Slippers, and Golitsin and Andrey in Khovanshchina. He portrayed Kachovsky in Shaporin's The Decembrists. Nelepp was also known for his portrayals in European operas of Florestan in Fidelio, Radames in Aida, and Don Jose in Carmen. He recorded arias from the roles of Pinkerton in Madame Butterfly, Walther in Die Meistersinger, and Eléazar in La Juive. Nelepp took part in 20 recordings of complete operas. During his career of 27 years, he sang in more than 1600 performances. He was awarded three Stalin Prizes: in 1942 for his performance in The Enchantress, in 1948 for The Bartered Bride, and in 1950 for Sadko.

Nelepp was and still is known for the beautiful quality of his voice and for his memorable characterizations. He is likewise remembered for his sense of humor, perfectionism, and work ethic. Interviewed for a Russian documentary about Nelepp, opera director Boris Alexandrovich Pokrovsky recalled how the tenor continually asked for even the slightest suggestions to improve his facial expressions, hand gestures, posture and any other conveyance of his character. Rehearsing with Nelepp, he reflected, "we felt the process of creating an image, the process of the emergence of a living person on the stage, who understands, suffers and loves."

In a radio program about Nelepp, contemporary Russian opera singer Sergei Givargizova noted that Nelepp often broke with the conventional portrayals of the characters he played. It was difficult to surprise Leningrad, Givargizova observed, but Nelepp did it in his rendering of Lensky in his debut.

Givargizova considered Gherman in Pique Dame to have been Nelepp's greatest role. Gherman was stereotypically portrayed as a mentally unstable gambling addict. However, Nelepp's more complicated interpretation incorporated admirable qualities, conveying, for example, that Gherman gambled to provide for his beloved Lisa. Thus, Nelepp's Gherman closely resembled Pushkin's portrayal of the character in the story that is the basis of the opera. According to Givargizova, Nelepp would typically follow the director's interpretation of a role, but with increasing rehearsal, arrive at his own. If necessary, he would argue for it, albeit not always successfully.

In his day, Nelepp had a large public following. Frolova-Walker refers to him as "a celebrity tenor." However, compared to the marketing of celebrities today, the Bolshoi Theater's promotion of Nelepp was minimal, due in part perhaps to his death at the early age of 53. He is visually memorialized in only a small cache of photographs and two videos of him performing. The impressions of contemporary opera fans suggest his staying power decades after his death.

In a 1999 Gramophone review of a 1948 recording of Boris Godunov featuring Nelepp, John Warrack writes, “Among the tenors, there is a splendid Grigory from Georgy Nelepp, his high, clear voice in splendid estate, his characterization of this Pretender strong and suggesting determination and not merely obsession.”

On Classical CD Review, a commentator appraised Nelepp's 1957 recording of Fidelio as follows: "Pride of place goes to the great Russian spinto tenor, Georgi Nelepp, as Florestan. [...] Nelepp sings his demanding role with a combination of dramatic intensity, technical ease, and handsome vocal quality that places his Florestan near the very top of the list among recorded interpretations."

Dan Davis of Classics Today reviewed Nelepp's 1952 recording of Pique Dame, observing, "Nelepp's singing and characterization is several leagues beyond the Hermans of other available complete Pique Dame recordings. His voice is big enough to capture Herman's macabre obsession but he also gives us a rounded character whose noble side, so often neglected by singers, helps explain Lisa's attraction to him."

On the 110th anniversary of his birth, the Bolshoi Theatre held an honorary exhibit of Nelepp memorabilia. The same year, at the Kirov, he was the subject of a scholarly lecture in the series “Dazzling Names of the Kirov-Mariinsky Theatre.”

The Bolshoi commemoration features recollections from Nelepp's director and friend L. V. Baratov: "When he was singing . . . no one would ever think about giving him a round of applause for a perfect high ‘C’, because this would have ruined the overall impression his performance made. What did captivate the audience was the image that the singer created, his character and its vital force." “Nelepp's artistic legacy,” the anniversary tribute continues, "is the pride of the musical and theatrical culture."
