= House of Kukolnik =

- Дом Кукольника
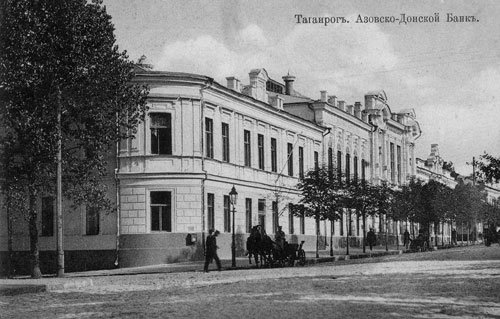
- Interactive map of the House of Kukolnik area

General information
- Location: Taganrog, Petrovskaya Street, 74
- Coordinates: 47°12′50″N 38°55′55″E

The House of Kukolnik (Russian: Дом Кукольника) is an object of cultural heritage of regional value which settles down the street Petrovsky, 74 in the city of Taganrog of the Rostov Oblast. The building remained till the 21st century.

== History ==
In 1857 in Taganrog, the family lodged in the wooden building which was built on the stone base: Nestor Vasilyevich Kukolnik and his wife Amalia Ivanovna. In 1861 Amalia Kukolnik submitted the application to construction committee for the purpose of drawing up the project of the two-storeyed brick house which as a result was constructed and remained till our times to the address Petrovskaya Street, 74. So, since the beginning of the 1860s, the house began to be registered in its property. Her husband lived in this house from 1859 to 1868. In the history of Taganrog Nestor Vasilyevich was an outstanding figure: it worked on the project of the railroad which conducted from the city of Kharkiv to Taganrog. Subsequently, it was prolonged for the Caucasus and began to be called the North Caucasian railroad. He became the founder of the musical society, and in 1865 was elected to Vowels of the Duma. It was known not only as the active public figure, but also the person creative. Nestor Kukolnik wrote the drama "Hand of God Otechestvo Spasl" thanks to which his name became known to much, and the emperor Nicholas I. He wrote romances on which words Mikhail Ivanovich Glinka composed music. One of its romances — "Doubt" — was executed by Fedor Shalyapin. Among his acquaintances, there was Pavel Egorovich Chekhov — Anton Chekhov's father. The emperor Alexander I was the godfather of Nestor Kukolnik.

Nestor Kukolnik supported opening in Taganrog of a female gymnasium and the political newspaper basis, worried about an ecological condition of the Sea of Azov.

Apartments on the top floor in the house down the street Petrovsky, 74 were leased. The publication of it was published in the Politseysky Listok newspaper in 1865. Konstantin Rabotin who was engaged in notarial activity lived in the same house. Nestor Kukolnik suddenly died on December 8, 1868. A couple had no children.

Amalia Ivanovna repeatedly married doctor Panteleymon Ivanovich Rabotin. He got an education in the Taganrog men's gymnasium and ended it in 1851. Worked as the doctor in this gymnasium. Documents according to which there was a plan of purchase of the house of Amalia Rabotina for needs of the district court from 1869 to 1882 remained, but in practice, the second floor of the house was occupied with District court from 1869 to 1879. The emergence of a district court in Taganrog became possible thanks to Nestor Kukolnik's activity. After a while, Panteleymon Rabotin left the wife Amalia.

From 1898 to 1915 the house belonged to Azovo-Donskoy to the Commercial bank. Though the board of bank since 1904 was in St. Petersburg, but not in Taganrog, in the city, all the same, there was its office. In 1912 in the building the barrister K. E. Adabashev worked. The notary Ivan Kirpichev with the spouse Aleksandra who he worked as the teacher of French rented the apartment for accommodation.

In 1920 in the house down the street Petrovsky, 74, treasury division and department of national education were placed. The department of national education included 4 sections: preschool, school, out-of-school and musical and theatrical. In 1947 on the first floor of the house the city archive was placed, and in the neighborhood, there was a savings bank, the Central statistical office and a finance department of Leninsky district. Since 1992 it is protected as an object of cultural heritage of regional value. In the 21st century on the house in which Nestor Kukolnik lived the commemorative plaque is established.

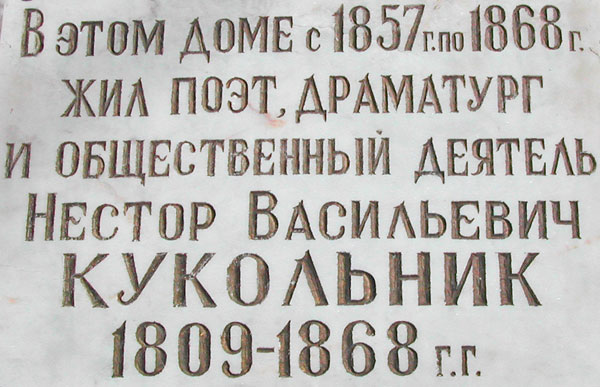

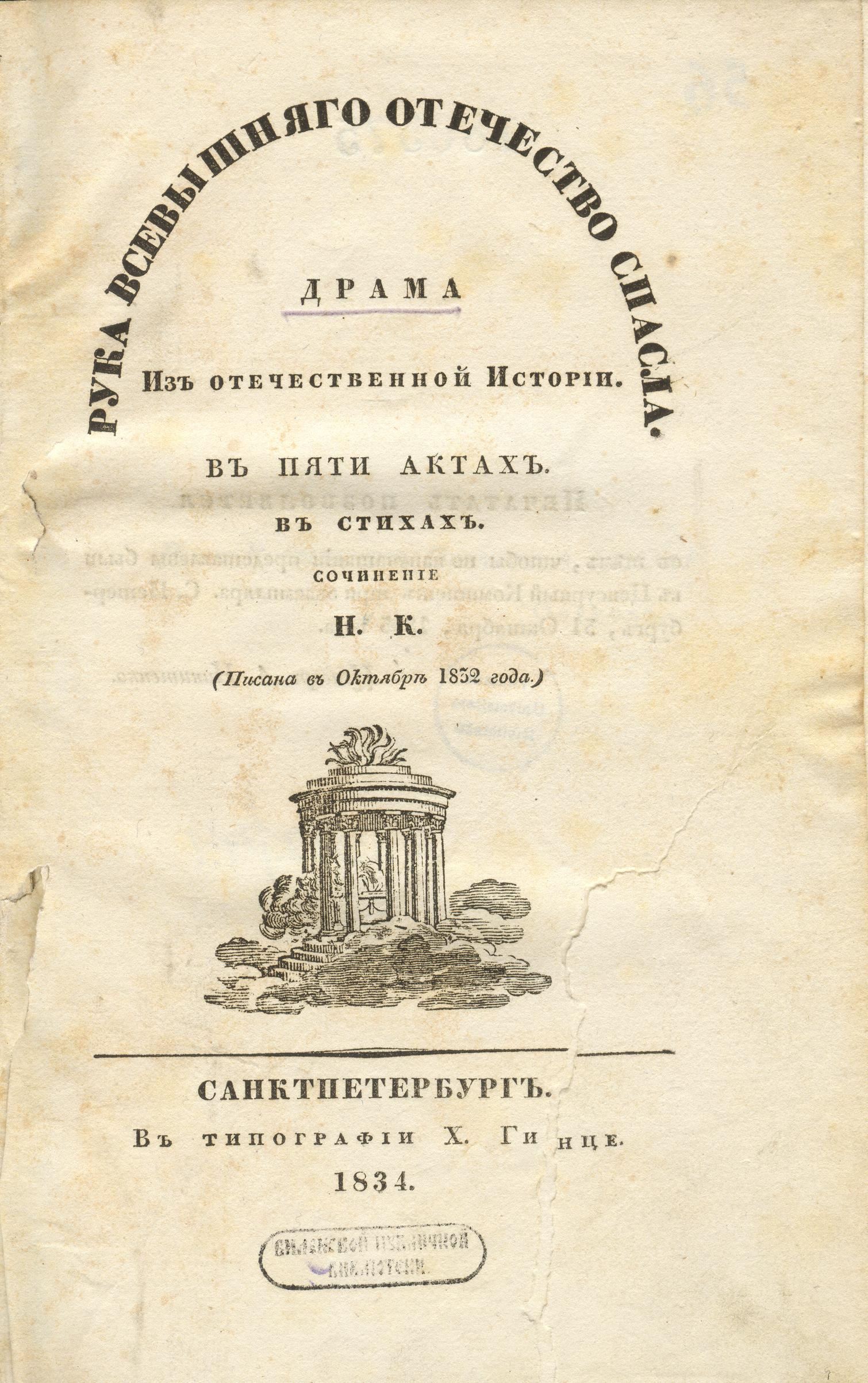

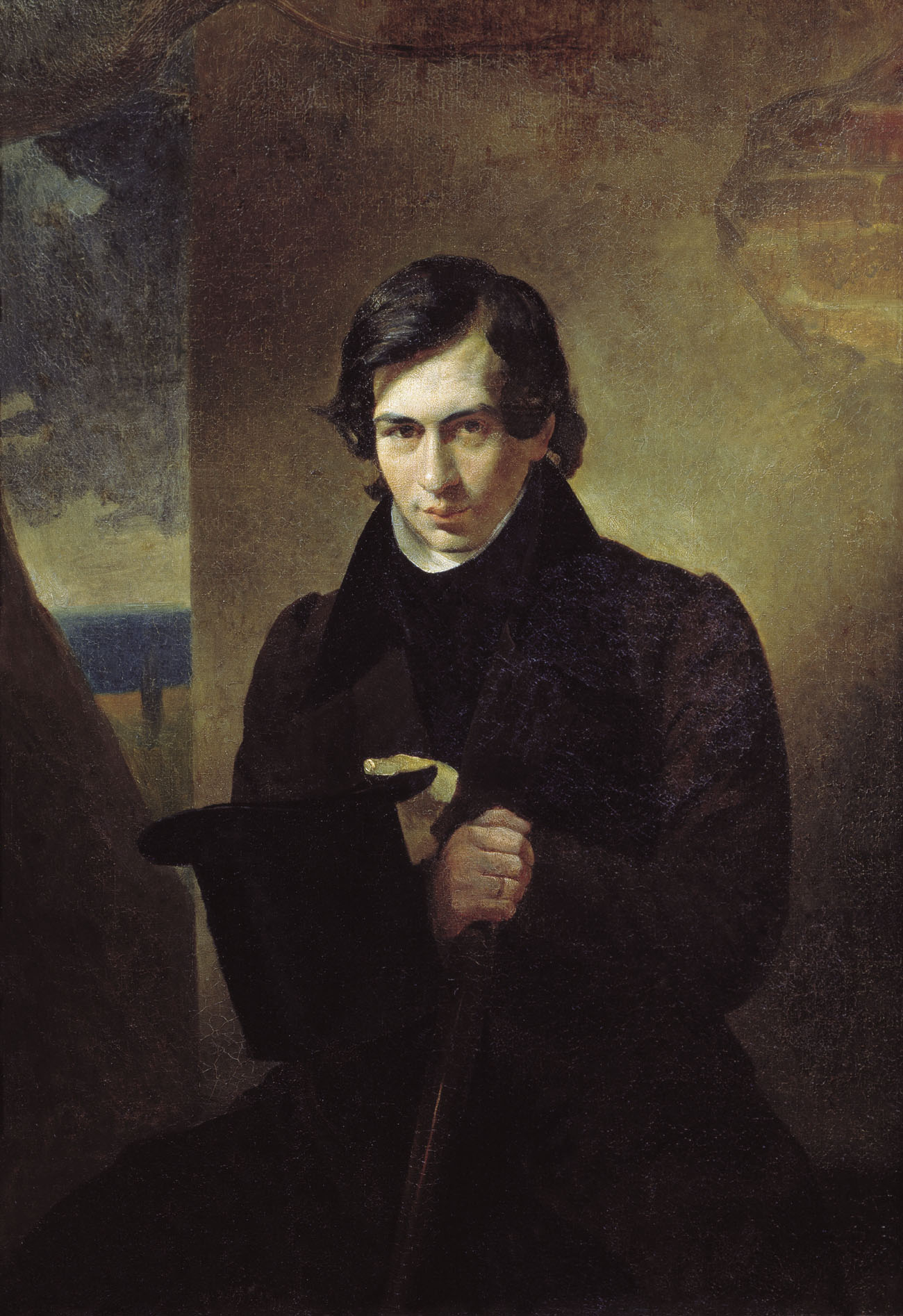
