= A Life for the Tsar =

1836 opera by Mikhail Glinka

- Opera by Mikhail Glinka
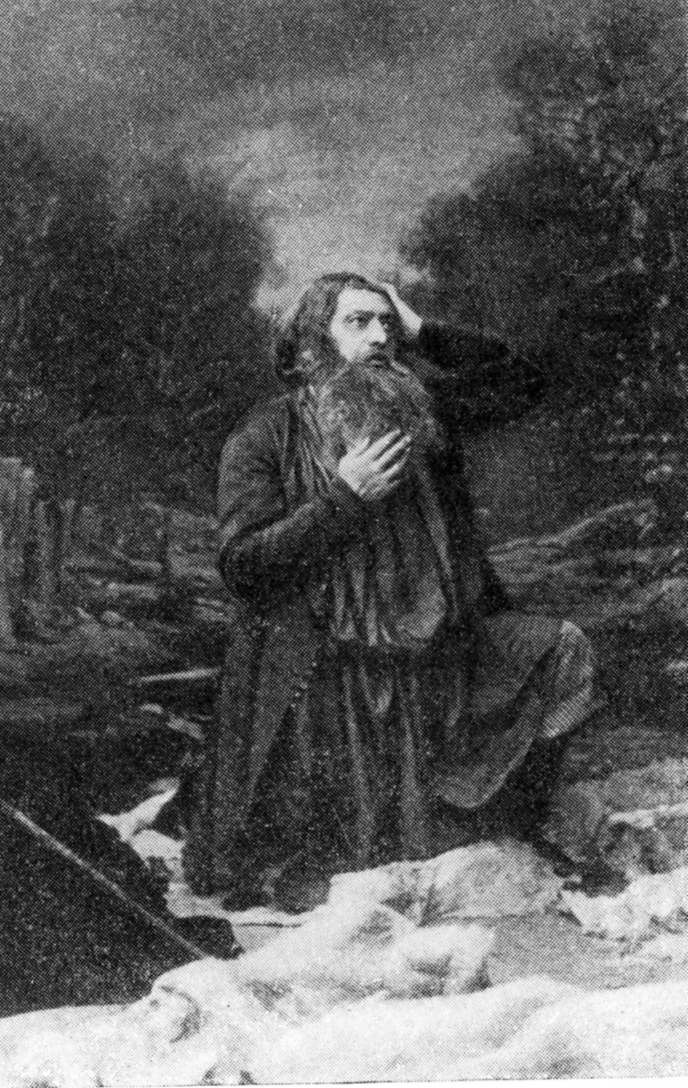
- Osip Petrov as Ivan Susanin in the premiere
- Native title: Russian: "Жизнь за царя", Zhizn' za tsarya
- Librettist: Nestor Kukolnik; Baron Yegor Fyodorovich Rozen; Vladimir Sollogub; Vasily Zhukovsky
- Language: Russian
- Premiere: 9 December 1836 (New Style); Bolshoi Kamenny Theatre, Saint Petersburg

A Life for the Tsar (Russian: Жизнь за царя, romanized: Zhizn za tsarya) is a "patriotic-heroic tragic" opera in four acts with an epilogue by Mikhail Glinka. During the Soviet era the opera was known under the name Ivan Susanin (Russian: Иван Сусанин), due to the anti-monarchist censorship.

The original Russian libretto, based on historical events, was written by Nestor Kukolnik, Egor Fyodorovich (von) Rozen, Vladimir Sollogub and Vasily Zhukovsky. It premiered on 27 November 1836 OS (9 December NS) at the Bolshoi Kamenny Theatre in Saint Petersburg. The historical basis of the plot involves Ivan Susanin, a patriotic hero of the early 17th century who died in the expulsion of the invading Polish army for the newly elected Tsar Michael of Russia, the first of the Romanov dynasty, elected in 1613.

== History ==
=== Composition history ===
The plot of A Life for the Tsar had been used earlier in 1815, when Catterino Cavos, an Italian-Russian composer, had written a two-act singspiel with the same subject and title. The original title of the opera was to be Ivan Susanin, after the hero, but when Nicholas I attended a rehearsal, Glinka changed the title to A Life for the Tsar as an ingratiating gesture. This title was retained in the Russian Empire.

In 1924, under the new Soviet administration, it appeared under the title Hammer and Sickle, but that production was not successful and was shelved. On 26 February 1939 it reappeared under the title Glinka had originally chosen, Ivan Susanin.

Glinka and the writers with whom he was associated chose, in Susanin, a hero of Russian nationalism well suited to the mood of the time. The opera was immediately hailed as a great success, and became the obligatory season-opener in the Imperial Russian opera theaters. A Life for the Tsar occupies an important position in Russian musical theater as the first native opera to win a permanent place in the repertoire. It was one of the first Russian operas to be known outside Russia.

=== Performance history ===
The opera was given its premiere performance on 27 November 1836 in Saint Petersburg conducted by Catterino Cavos with set designs by Andreas Roller. It was followed several years later with its premiere in Moscow on 7 September (Old Style) 1842 in a new production with sets by Serkov and Shenyan.

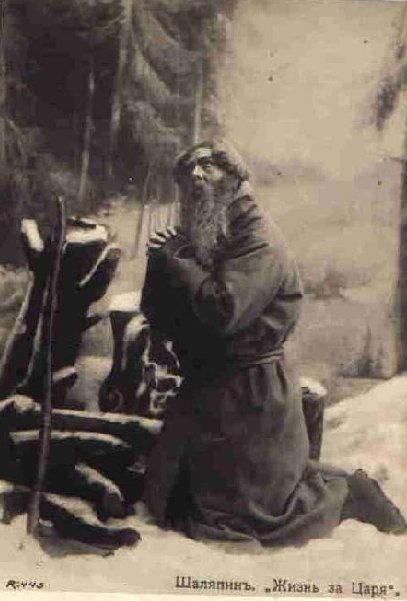
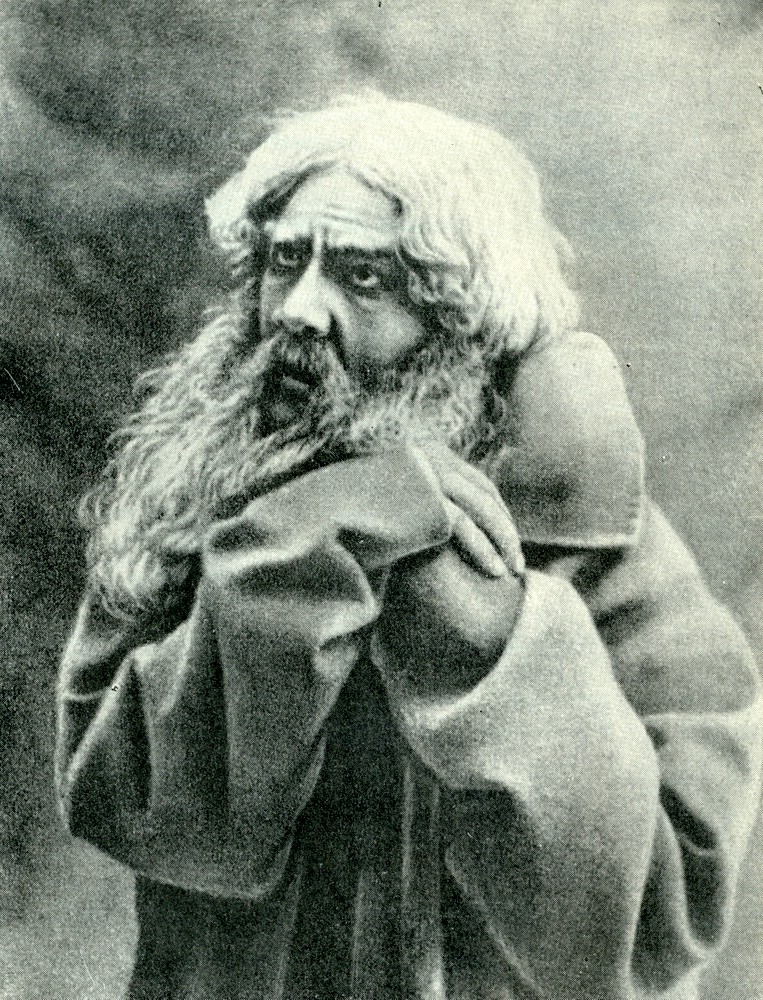
Feodor Chaliapin as Susanin

Glinka's opera was featured heavily throughout the Romanov Tercentenary celebrations in 1913. It was performed in a gala performance at the Mariinsky Theatre, Schools, regiments, and amateur companies throughout imperial Russia staged performances of A Life for the Tsar. Pamphlets and the penny press printed the story of Susanin "ad nauseam", and one newspaper told how Susanin had shown each and every soldier how to fulfill his oath to the sovereign. The image of the seventeenth-century peasant features prominently at the bottom of the Romanov Monument in Kostroma, where a female personification of Russia gives blessings to a kneeling Susanin. In Kostroma, Tsar Nicholas II was even presented with a group of Potemkin peasants who claimed to be descendants of Susanin.

=== Publication history ===
- 1857, piano–vocal score, as A Life for the Tsar, Stellovsky, Saint Petersburg
- 1881, full score, as A Life for the Tsar, Stellovsky, Saint Petersburg
- 1907, new edition by Rimsky-Korsakov and Glazunov, Belyayev, Leipzig
- 1942, as Ivan Susanin, Muzgiz
- 1949, as Ivan Susanin, Muzgiz
- 1953, as Ivan Susanin, Muzgiz

== Influences ==
In keeping with Glinka's European training, much of A Life for the Tsar was structured according to conventional Italian and French models of the period. Nevertheless, several passages in the opera are based on Russian folk songs or folk melodic idioms that become a full part of the musical texture. With A Life for the Tsar, Glinka fully intended to "write music in Russian."

The dramatic nature of the story of Susanin inspired Glinka to develop a new type of recitative style that combined expressiveness, dramatic flexibility, and melodiousness with the intonation of Russian speech. This innovation enabled Glinka to set scenes of developing dramatic action to continuous music.

Most importantly, this opera laid the foundation for the series of Russian nationalistic historical operas continued by works such as Serov's Rogneda, Mussorgsky's Boris Godunov, Rimsky-Korsakov's Maid of Pskov, Tchaikovsky's The Oprichnik or Mazeppa, and Borodin's Prince Igor.

== Roles ==
Role	Voice type	World premiere, Saint Petersburg 27 November (Old Style) (9 December, NS) 1836 Conductor: Catterino Cavos	Moscow premiere 7 September (Old Style) 1842 Conductor: Ivan Iogannis
Ivan Susanin, a peasant of the village of Domnino	bass	Osip Petrov	Dmitriy Kurov
Antonida, his daughter	soprano	Mariya Stepanova	Mariya Leonova
Vanya, Susanin's adopted son	contralto	Anna Petrova-Vorobyova	Anfisa Petrova
Bogdan Sobinin, a militiaman, Antonida's fiance	tenor	Lev Leonov	Alexander Bantyshev
Commander of the Polish Detachment	bass	Sergey Baykov	
A Polish courier	tenor	I. Makarov	
Commander of the Russian Detachment	bass	Aleksey Yefremov	
Chorus and silent: Peasant men and women, militiamen, Polish nobles and ladies, knights

== Performance practice ==
As popular as the opera was, its monarchist libretto was an embarrassment to the Soviet state. After some unsuccessful attempts were made to remedy this situation, in 1939 the poet S. M. Gorodetsky rewrote the text to remove references to the Tsar and otherwise make the libretto politically palatable.

== Synopsis ==
- Time: The autumn of 1612 and the winter of 1613.

=== Act 1 ===
The village of Domnino

Antonida is eager to marry Sobinin, but her father, Susanin, refuses permission until a Russian has been duly chosen to take the tsar's throne. When Sobinin informs him that the Grand Council in Moscow has chosen a tsar, everyone celebrates.

=== Act 2 ===
Poland

In a sumptuous hall, the nobility celebrates the Polish dominance over the Russians by singing and dancing. Suddenly, a messenger comes in with the news that Mikhail Romanov has been selected as the tsar of Russia but is now in hiding. The Poles vow to overthrow him.

=== Act 3 ===
Susanin's cabin

Susanin and his adopted son, Vanya, pledge to defend the new tsar. Susanin blesses Sobinin and Antonida on their upcoming wedding when a detachment of Polish soldiers bursts in to demand the tsar's whereabouts. Instead, Susanin sends Vanya to warn the tsar while Susanin leads the soldiers off the trail into the woods. Antonida is devastated. Sobinin gathers some men to go on a rescue mission.

=== Act 4 ===
A dense forest

Sobinin reassures his men of the rightness of their mission. When night falls, in a part of the forest near a monastery, Vanya knocks at the gates and alerts the inhabitants to spirit the tsar away. Susanin has led the suspicious Polish troops into an impassable, snow-covered area of the forest. The Poles sleep while Susanin waits for the dawn and bids farewell to his children. A blizzard sets in, and when day breaks, the Poles awake. They realise that Susanin has deceived them and so kill him.

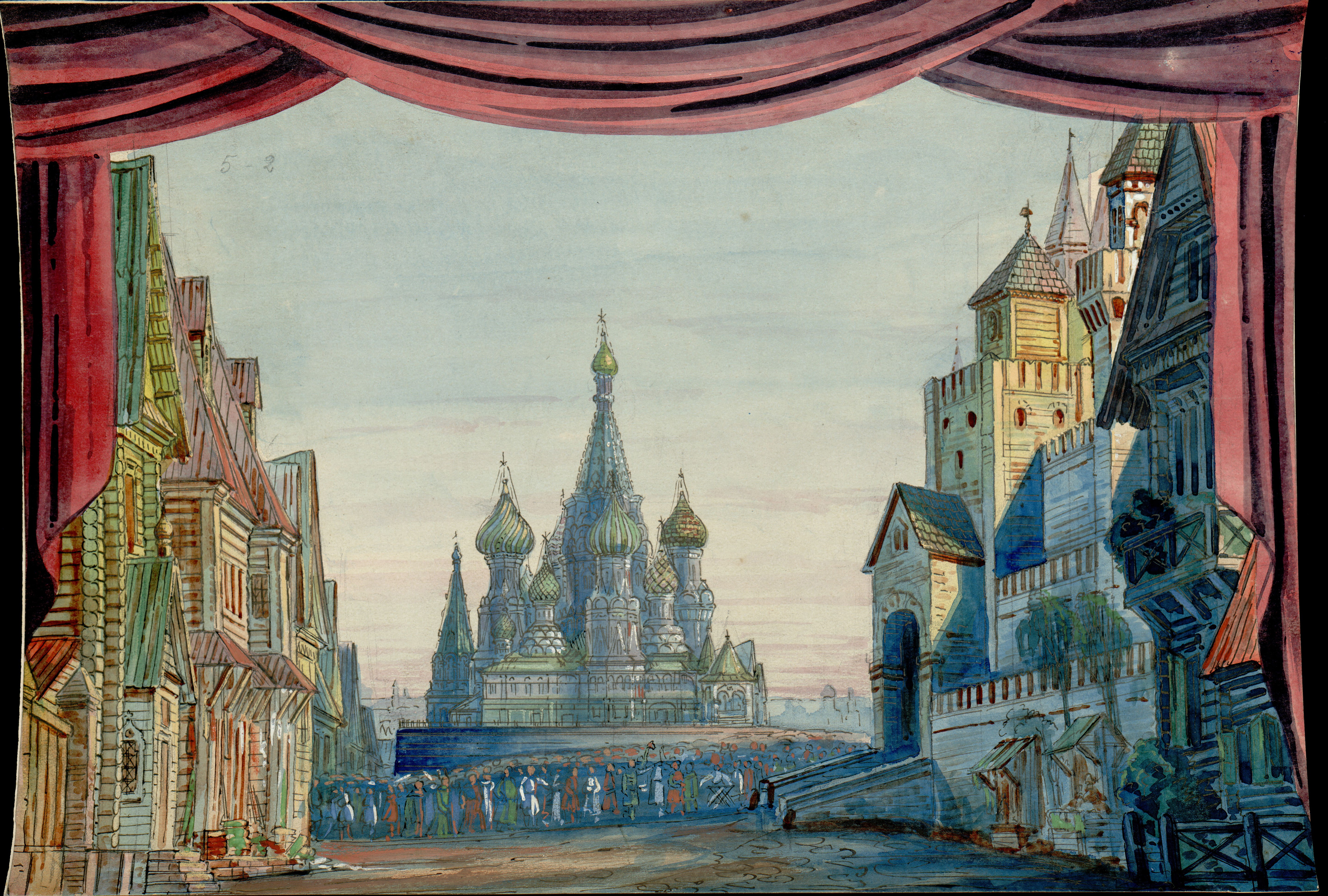
Set design for the epilogue

=== Epilogue ===
Red Square, Moscow.

Across the stage walks a crowd of people, celebrating the triumph of the new tsar. Alone in their own solemn procession, Antonida, Sobinin and Vanya mourn Susanin. A detachment of Russian troops comes upon them, discovers their connection with Susanin and comforts them. As the scene changes to Red Square, the people proclaim glory to the tsar and to Susanin's memory.

== Principal arias and numbers ==
Overture

Act 1

Cavatina and Rondo: "To the field, to the field," «В поле, в поле» (Antonida)

Act 2

Chorus: Polonaise, Полонез
Dance: Krakowiak, Краковяк
Dance: Waltz, Вальс
Dance: Mazurka, Мазурка

Act 3

Song: "When they killed the little bird's mother," «Как мать убили у малого птенца» (Vanya)

Act 4

Aria: "Brother in the darkness we are not able to find our enemy," No. 18; (Sobinine)
Aria: "They sense the truth!", «Чуют правду!» No. 21; (Susanin)

"Glory"
Music of Kremlin chimes is played at 3 and 9 am and pm. Chimes play the melody of the chorus "Glory". The playback rhythm has been increased for the easy recognition of the melody.

Epilogue

Chorus: "Glory, Glory to you, our Russian Tsar!", «Славься, славься, нашъ русскiй Царь!» (People)

Orchestral excerpts heard in the concert hall consist largely of the overture and the Polish numbers of the second act. Another excerpt that is also used by concert bands and military bands is the Slavsya finale arranged for wind band as a fanfare. It is famous for being used in the 1945 Moscow Victory Parade and in other military parades since then. It is also a sung piece by choral groups. The finale piece was adapted for and has been also part of the repertoire of the world-famous Alexandrov Ensemble since 2004.

== Instrumentation ==
The opera is scored for two flutes, two oboes (second oboe doubling cor anglais), two clarinets (in B flat and A), two bassoons, four horns, two clarino natural trumpets, three trombones, ophicleide, timpani, bells, harp, strings, as well as two offstage wind bands or concert bands, offstage clarinet in A, offstage chromatic (valved) trumpet, offstage drum, offstage bells. Some pieces are also scored for full orchestra, including the dance segments. The finale piece, another popular composition played in patriotic concerts and other events, can be also arranged for a full military band or concert band with the bells and chromatic trumpets and also for the Balalaika and the Bayan accordion, as heard in several cover versions.

== Recordings ==
Year	Conductor, chorus, orchestra	Susanin	Antonida	Sobinin	Vanya	Notes
1947	Aleksandr Melik-Pashayev, Bolshoi Theatre Chorus and Orchestra	Maxim Mikhailov	Natalya Shpiller	Georgii Nelepp	Elizaveta Antonova	
1950	Vassili Nebolsin, Bolshoi Theatre Chorus and Orchestra	Mark Reizen	Elizaveta Shumskaya	Georgi Nelepp	Irina Sokolova	
1954	Alfredo Simonetto, RAI Milano Chorus and Orchestra	Boris Christoff	Virginia Zeani	Giuseppe Campora	Anna Maria Rota	Live in Italian
1955	Oskar Danon, Yugoslav Army Chorus and Belgrade National Opera Orchestra	Miroslav Čangalović	Marija Glavačević	Drago Starc	Milica Miladinović	
1957	Igor Markevitch, Belgrade Opera Chorus and Orchestre Lamoureux	Boris Christoff	Teresa Stich-Randall	Nicolai Gedda	Melanija Bugarinović	
1957	Boris Khaikin, Bolshoi Theatre Chorus and Orchestra	Ivan Petrov	Vera Firsova	Nikolai Gres	Valentina Klepatskaya	
1979	Mark Ermler, USSR Bolshoi Theatre Chorus and Orchestra	Yevgeny Nesterenko	Bela Rudenko	Vladimir Shcherbakov	Tamara Sinyavskaya	
1986	Ivan Marinov, Sofia National Opera Chorus and Orchestra	Nicola Ghiuselev	Elena Stoyanova	Roumen Doikov	Hristina Angelakova	
1989	Emil Tchakarov, Sofia National Opera Chorus and Sofia Festival Orchestra	Boris Martinovich	Alexandrina Pendatchanska	Chris Merritt	Stefania Toczyska	
1992	Alexander Lazarev, Bolshoi Theatre Orchestra and Chorus	Yevgeny Nesterenko	Marina Mescheriakova	Alexander Lomonosov	Elena Zaremba	Live DVD

== Sources ==
- Annesley, Charles (pseudonym of Charles and Anna Tittmann) (1920). The Standard Operaglass: Detailed Plots of Two Hundred and Thirty-Five Celebrated Operas. Brentanos
- Figes, Orlando (2014). A People's Tragedy: The Russian Revolution 1891–1924. London: The Bodley Head. ISBN 9781847922915.
- Hodge, Thomas P. (1998). "Susanin, Two Glinkas and Ryleev: History-Making in A Life for the Tsar". In Wachtel, Andrew (ed.). Intersections and Transpositions: Russian Music, Literature, and Society. Northwestern University Press. ISBN 0-8101-1580-8.
- Osborne, Charles (2007). The Opera Lover's Companion. Yale University Press. ISBN 0-300-12373-6.
