= The Decembrists (opera) =

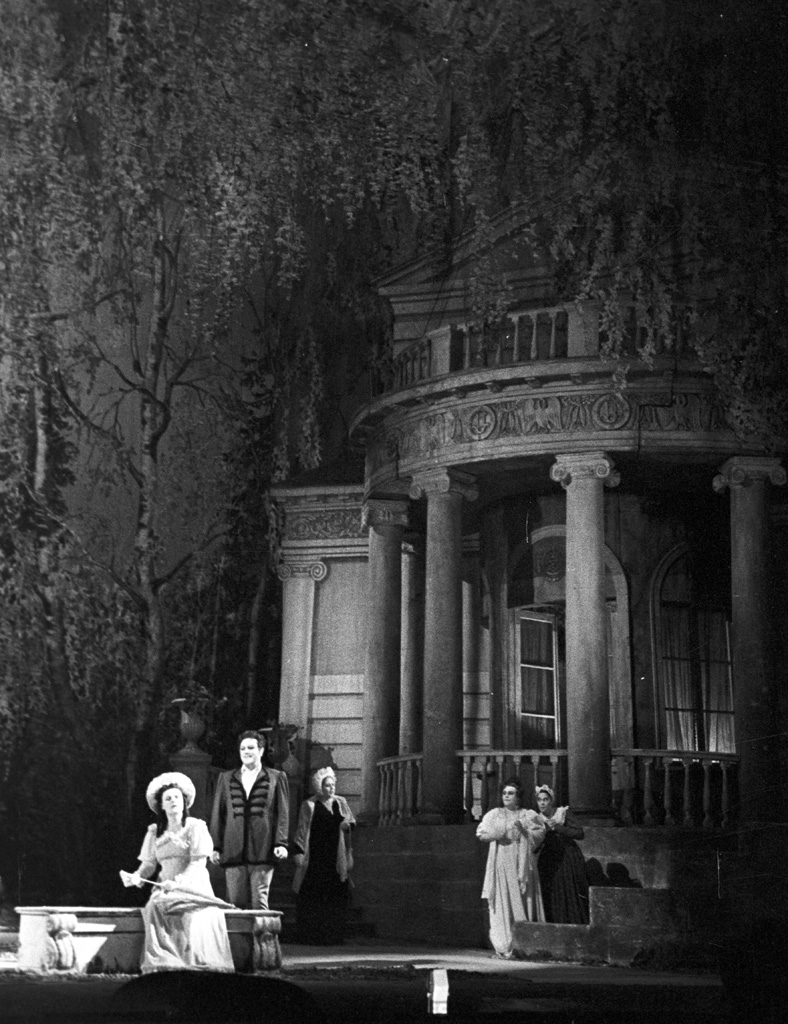
Nina Pokrovskaya as Yelena Orlova, and Grigory Bolshakov as Shchepin-Rostov (1963)

The Decembrists (Russian: Декабристы, Dekabristi) is an historical opera by Yuri Shaporin with libretto by Vsevolod Rozhdestvensky, Aleksey Tolstoy and others. It was premiered in 1953 after a long and difficult period of composition lasting some 30 years. In a style highly reminiscent of the great 19th-century Russian composers, especially Borodin, Mussorgsky and Tchaikovsky, it gives a rather fictionalized account of the 1825 Decembrist revolt of Russian army officers against the Tsarist government. Frequently performed in the Soviet Union, where it was seen as the culmination of Shaporin's career, it has never been well known in the West except through its most popular number, the Soldiers' Chorus.

== Composition ==
The Decembrists had a long gestation, lasting indeed for most of Shaporin's professional life. In its first version, titled Polina Gyobel’, it focused on the love between Ivan Annenkov, one of the conspirators in the Decembrist revolt of 1825, and his French wife, the title-character. Polina Gyobel’ had a libretto by the historian Pavel Shchegolev and Shaporin's close friend Aleksey Tolstoy, one of whose poems he had previously set. Two scenes from it were performed in 1925 to mark the uprising's centenary. In the succeeding years Shaporin worked on rewriting the opera, taking advice from his friend Boris Asafyev and other writers. In 1935 the Bolshoi Theatre in Moscow commissioned a work from him, inducing him on to renew his efforts, and some scenes from a new version were staged at the Bolshoi shortly thereafter. For several years from 1947 Shaporin worked his way towards a third version of the opera, going through a series of new draft librettos by several well-known writers; over the years enough of these were produced to fill seven filing boxes. This version, completed in 1951, still did not meet with official approval. The last libretto, largely by Vsevolod Rozhdestvensky, brought to the forefront the Decembrist revolutionaries themselves rather than the two lovers, and assigned a greater role to the Russian masses than in fact they actually played in the Decembrist story, Shaporin having been persuaded to abandon his previous intention to keep his opera historically accurate. This version culminated in a battle-scene conceived on a huge scale which could only be produced by an opera house boasting a very large stage and an almost unlimited budget for sets and extras. By September 1952, having met all the authorities' demands for revision, Shaporin had completed his score and a production had been prepared by the Bolshoi, but no-one dared to stage it until Joseph Stalin had seen and approved it. Twice he failed to turn up to inspect the production, and this obstacle was only finally removed by Stalin's death in March 1953.

== First performances ==
The opera was premiered in Moscow at the Bolshoi Theatre on 23 June 1953 with Alexander Melik-Pashayev conducting. The Leningrad premiere took place later that month at the Mariinsky Theatre with Boris Khaikin conducting.

== Roles ==
Role	Voice type
Kondraty Ryleyev, a poet	baritone
Colonel Pavel Ivanovich Pestel, of the Vyatka Regiment	bass
Captain Mikhail Bestuzhev-Ryumin of the Dragoon Life Guards, officer and poet	bass
Prince Sergei Petrovich Trubetskoy, Colonel of the Preobazhensky Life Guards	baritone
Pyotr Kakhovsky	tenor
Iakubovich, captain in a dragoon regiment	bass
Prince Dimitri Alexandrovich Tchepin-Rostovsky, staff captain in the Moscow Guards Regiment	tenor
Princess Olga Mironovna, Prince Dimitri's mother	mezzo-soprano
Madame Orlova, a neighbour	mezzo-soprano
Elena, Madame Orlova's daughter	soprano
Maria Timofeievna, the Princess's housekeeper	soprano
Stesha, a gypsy	mezzo-soprano
Rostovtsev, an officer of the Egersky Regiment	tenor
Nicholas I, Tsar of Russia	bass
Count Alexander von Benckendorff	bass
The General-Governor	bass
The Metropolitan Seraphim	tenor
Sergeitch, a porter at the Peter and Paul Fortress	bass
A major-domo	bass
A nightwatchman	bass
First peasant	tenor
Second peasant	bass
Chorus of soldiers, workers, peasants, serfs, girls, gypsies, watchmen, policemen, guests and others.

== Synopsis ==
=== Act 1 ===
On the estate of Princess Olga Tchepin-Rostovsky a group of peasant girls sing about their life of servitude. She threatens to have them whipped. Her son, Prince Dimitri, enters and denounces the institution of serfdom. The princess is scandalized, and assures him that under the Tsar everyone is protected, but Dimitri replies that the Tsar is a tyrant. The princess supposes he must be mad or in love. He is in love, says Dimitri, with a girl who is neither rich nor of good family. Two neighbours now enter, Madame Orlova and her daughter Elena. Orlova and the princess go indoors to talk, leaving Dimitri to declare to Elena that he loves her. When the older women return the princess realizes what has been said and turns on both Orlova and her son in anger. Enter Colonel Pestel, an officer who knows Dimitri and shares his dissident views. They agree that a complete revolution is needed but suspect that another group, led by Prince Trubetzkoi, would prefer a constitutional monarchy. Pestel sends Dimitri to St Petersburg with a letter to another revolutionary, the poet Konrad Ryliev.

At a roadside tavern a group of conspirators, including Trubetzkoi, Kachovsky and Iakubovich, have met. Dimitri enters and raises the question of whether their insurrection should be in St Petersburg or in the south, and when Bestuzhev arrives with the news that the Tsar has killed himself they decide by a majority that the time for revolution has come.

Outside the tavern a fair is being held at which rumours of the Tsar's death are spreading. The fair is closed down by the police, leaving the scene almost deserted. Dimitri appears, recognizes Elena there, and tells her he must leave for St Petersburg.

=== Act 2 ===
In Ryliev's apartment in St Petersburg the officers spend the night making final plans for their insurrection. Kachovsky says the troops due to swear allegiance to the new Tsar are on their side, but when Trubetzkoi arrives he disagrees, informing them also that the new Tsar will not be Grand Duke Constantine, as expected, but his younger brother Nicholas. As dawn approaches they decide that Trubetzkoi will take command of the troops in Senate Square later that day. Surely the hour of liberty is at hand!

In the Winter Palace Nicholas is not sure that the people of St Petersburg will accept him. Try a peaceful approach first, he tells the General-Governor, but then guns if necessary.

The Moscow regiment, headed by Dimitri and Bestuzhev, arrives in a crowded Senate Square and is greeted by Ryliev. A deputation of priests sent by the Tsar is driven away angrily by the crowd. Trubetzkoi witnesses this scene and, alarmed at the signs of a military insurrection turning into a revolt of the people, abandons his fellow-officers. The General-Governor arrives and demands the troops return to their barracks, but he is shot dead by Kachovsky. The Marine Guards march into the square and attack the revolutionaries with artillery. In the ensuing struggle Dimitri is wounded.

=== Act 3 ===
A masquerade ball is held to celebrate the crushing of the revolt, Elena being one of the dancers. She has come to ask the Tsar's permission to accompany Dimitri to Siberia, but Princess Olga, when they meet, refuses to help her in this, calling her son a traitor. The Tsar spots Elena and dances with her. Elena inveigles the Tsar into promising to grant her a request. When he finds what that is the Tsar is indignant, but reluctantly keeps his promise. Elena is ordered to leave the ball.

=== Act 4 ===
In a dungeon under the Peter and Paul Fortress Ryliev reflects on the crushing of the revolution. Some of the conspirators are led out, one by one, for execution; Pestel, the last one, embraces Ryliev, and they foresee a bright future for Russia.

Out in the central courtyard of the fortress the porter, an old soldier, gossips with Dimitri and Bestuzhev, who are being given exercise. Elena arrives and assures Dimitri she is going with him.

On the road to Siberia the party of exiled Decembrists passes a group of disconsolate serfs and sings a final Hymn to Liberation.

== Influences ==
The Decembrists is a work firmly in the tradition of 19th-century Russian opera. Tchaikovsky, Mussorgsky, Rimsky-Korsakov, and particularly the Borodin of Prince Igor are among the composers seen as being most influential on its style and structure, though Shaporin's work is more than a mere pastiche. Harmonically, it draws on Shaporin's encyclopedic knowledge of music history, sometimes, it has been said, sounding like "a grousy Grieg or an attenuated Wagner", and at other times reminding the listener of the harmonies of Borodin, Tchaikovsky and, if only faintly, of Prokofiev.

== Reception ==
The Decembrists has been a popular work in Russia, and for many years in the Soviet era it was the only contemporary opera in the Bolshoi's permanent repertoire. The Soldiers' Chorus, which announces the arrival of the Moscow regiment in Senate Square, is the popular hit of the work, a frequently performed crowd-pleaser which has, according to the musicologist Stanley D. Krebs, achieved "a folk popularity". However, it must be said that the success of the opera as a whole has not spread to the West.

Soviet critics were largely agreed that The Decembrists was a great achievement, accessible, dramatic and in keeping with the Russian national tradition. Dimitri and Elena were thought to be successful Romantic creations, and there was praise for his vision of the Russian masses and of the various Decembrist leaders, even if the latter were not particularly differentiated musically. There was wide agreement that the composer should have made the rebellion itself the climax of the opera, but the final scene, in which the Decembrists and the peasants express their hope for the future together, was nevertheless praised. The phrase "optimistic tragedy" was coined to summarise Shaporin's conception of his theme, and one critic wrote that he had

successfully translated the lofty tone of the Decembrists' civic feelings and intentions, the historical optimism of their struggle, and instilled in the listeners deep sympathy for the heroes who gave their young lives for the happiness of future generations.

Shostakovich, not in general an enthusiast for Shaporin's works, wrote that

The quality of the music is very high. It's in good taste, melodious and very singable. I may be a little concerned that the characters are not clearly individuated, but I cannot deny that the composer has succeeded in his presentation of this collective portrait of the Decembrists.

Later critics in the West and elsewhere have seen this opera as being well-made, far better than the general run of the Soviet Union's propaganda works. Paul Griffiths has gone so far as to call it "the outstanding [Soviet] opera of the period", although others have denied it to be a great opera comparable to Prokofiev's and Shostakovich's finest works. There has been much criticism of the libretto, which Boris Schwarz considered "undramatic and structurally deficient", making the opera static. Stanley Krebs was disappointed by the shift of focus in the libretto's final version from the love story to the history of the Decembrist revolt; both he and Ludmilla Trigos believed that the opera struggles to solve the problem of how to make the people the centre of the action, as socialist realist orthodoxy demands, when historically they were not. The characters have been called "walking statues", the Tsar, for example, being "evil overdone". The music has been praised for its glossy surface, and for its nobility and lyricism. Stephen Johnson has written that "the vocal writing is sympathetic, the orchestral contribution has colour, atmosphere and, in places, real intensity of feeling"; however, he had to agree with Gerald Abraham in missing "some element that can be isolated and labelled 'unmistakable Shaporin'".

== Recording ==
The Orchestra and Chorus of the Bolshoi Theatre under Alexander Melik-Pashayev, who were entrusted with the opera's premiere in 1953, made the only complete recording of The Decembrists the following year. The cast included Alexei Ivanov, Alexander Pirogov, Ivan Petrov and Georgii Nelepp. In 2004 a remastered version of this recording was released on CD by Preiser Records.

== Footnotes ==
=== References ===
- Abraham, Gerald (1943). Eight Soviet Composers. London: Oxford University Press.
- Barnett, Rob (4 March 2004). "Review of Yuri Shaporin The Decembrists 1954 recording, PREISER 90574". MusicWeb International.
- Frolova-Walker, Marina (2016). Stalin's Music Prize: Soviet Culture and Politics. New Haven: Yale University Press. ISBN 9780300208849.
- Goldman, Leah (Summer 2016). "Negotiating 'historical truth': art, authority, and Iurii Shaporin's The Decembrists". The Journal of Musicology. 33 (3): 277–331. doi:10.1525/jm.2016.33.3.277. JSTOR 26414238.
- Grant, Julian (2001). "Yuri Shaporin". In Holden, Amanda (ed.). The New Penguin Opera Guide. London: Penguin. p. 847. ISBN 0140293124.
- Johnson, Stephen (1992). "Decembrists, The [Dekabristi]". In Sadie, Stanley (ed.). The New Grove Dictionary of Opera. Vol. 1: A–D. London: Macmillan. pp. 1101–1103. ISBN 0333485521.
- Krebs, Stanley D. (1970). Soviet Composers and the Development of Soviet Music. London: George Allen and Unwin. ISBN 9780047800177.
- McAllister, Rita; Rayskin, Iosif Genrikhovich (2001). "Shaporin, Yury Aleksandrovich". In Sadie, Stanley (ed.). The New Grove Dictionary of Music and Musicians. Volume 23. London: Macmillan. pp. 215–217. ISBN 9780333608005.
- Schwarz, Boris (1972). Music and Musical Life in Soviet Russia 1917–1970. London: Barrie & Jenkins. ISBN 9780214652646.
- Trigos, Ludmilla A. (2009). The Decembrist Myth in Russian Culture. New York: Palgrave Macmillan. ISBN 9780230619166.
