= Mariya Stepanova =

Russian opera singer

Mariya Matveyevna Stepanova
- Мария Матвеевна Степанова
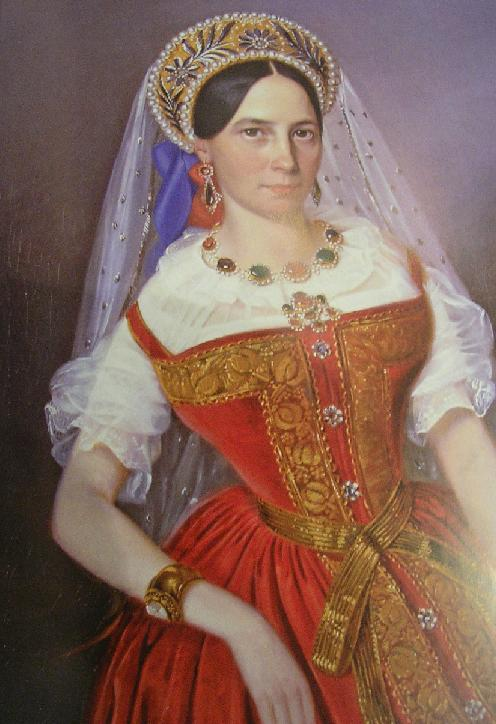
- Born: 1815; Kaluga, Russian Empire
- Died: 1903 (aged 87–88); St. Petersburg, Russia
- Occupation: Opera singer (soprano)

Mariya Matveyevna Stepanova (Russian: Мария Матвеевна Степанова; 1 January or 27 March 1815 – 1903) was a Russian opera singer who created the leading soprano roles in A Life for the Tsar, Ruslan and Lyudmila, and Dmitry Donskoy.

Stepanova was born into a family of musicians active in the Imperial Theatres in Saint Petersburg. She initially studied to be ballet dancer and was then trained in singing by Catterino Cavos. She made her operatic debut in 1835 and the following year created the role of Antonida in Glinka's A Life for the Tsar. She sang with the Imperial Opera at the Imperial Bolshoi Kamenny Theatre in Saint Petersburg until 1846 and then at the Bolshoi Theatre in Moscow until 1855 when she retired from the stage. During that time, she periodically returned to perform in Saint Petersburg where she created the role of Ksenia in Anton Rubinstein's Dmitry Donskoy in 1852.

Stepanova died in Saint Petersburg in 1903 and is buried in the city's Novodevichy Cemetery.
