= Yuri Shaporin =

Soviet composer (1887–1966)

Shaporin in 1948

Yuri Alexandrovich Shaporin (Russian: Юрий (Георгий) Александрович Шапорин) (8 November [O.S. 27 October] 1887 – 9 December 1966), PAU, was a Soviet composer. Two Stalin Prizes first degree (1941, 1946). Stalin Prize second degree (1952).

== Biography ==
Shaporin was born in Glukhov in the Russian Empire (now in Ukraine). His father was a painter and his mother a pianist. He received his secondary education in Saint Petersburg. He first studied philology at Kiev University and went on to study law at Saint Petersburg University.

He then turned to music, starting his studies at the Saint Petersburg Conservatory in 1913. His teachers there included Nikolay Sokolov (composition), Maximilian Steinberg (orchestration), and Nikolai Tcherepnin (conducting). He graduated as a composer and conductor in 1918.

After the Bolshoi Drama Theater was established in 1919, he served as its musical director until 1928. He then worked with the Russian State Pushkin Academy Drama Theater — also known as the Alexandrinsky Theater — until 1934. During this period he composed a significant amount of theater music. He was a founding member of the Association for Contemporary Music in 1923.

During the 1930s Shaporin turned his attention to large scale works. His opera Dekabristi (The Decembrists), to a libretto written by Aleksey Nikolayevich Tolstoy about the Decembrist revolt, had been on Shaporin's mind since 1920 — a 1925 interim version, Polina Gyobe, had two scenes staged in Leningrad (as it had been renamed in 1924). In 1938, Shaporin received an offer of a teaching position at the Moscow Conservatory and he moved to Moscow. That year, he completed a version of Dekabristi for a commission by the Bolshoi Theatre, but dissatisfied with it, he decided to revise it. In 1952, Shaporin was awarded the Stalin Prize. The opera was only completed in 1953, after collaboration with librettist Vsevolod Rozhdestvensky, and it was premiered at the Bolshoi Theatre on 23 June 1953.

Among Shaporin's students at the Moscow Conservatory were Edward Artemiev and Rodion Shchedrin.

== Selected works ==
- Piano sonatas (at least two. First sonata, opus 5 published around 1924. Sonata no. 2 is op. 7, published around 1929)
- Symphony for chorus and orchestra, op. 11, completed 1932 and premiered in London by Albert Coates and the BBC Symphony Orchestra
- Na pole Kulikovom (On the Field of Kulikovo): cantata, op. 14
- The Story of the Struggle for the Russian Soil op. 17 (recorded on HMV in about 1970)
- How long shall the kite fly? : oratorio for baritone, mezzo-soprano, chorus and orchestra, op. 20
- 5 Pieces for cello and piano, op. 25
- Ballade for piano, op. 28
- Dekabristy (The Decembrists), opera, completed 1953

== Film music ==
- The Deserter (1933)
- Tri pesni o Lenine (Three Songs about Lenin) (1934)
- Zaklyuchennye (Prisoners) (1936)
- Victory (1938)
- Minin and Pozharsky (1939)
- Suvorov (1941)
- Kutuzov (1944)
