= Vsevolod Rozhdestvensky =

Russian/Soviet poet

Vsevolod Aleksandrovich Rozhdestvensky (Russian: Все́волод Алекса́ндрович Рожде́ственский; 10 April 1895, Tsarskoye Selo – 31 August 1977, Leningrad) was a Russian and Soviet poet, journalist and war correspondent.

Rozhdestvensky served for four years as a war correspondent during World War II. He served on the Leningrad Front, Volkhov Front, and the Karelia Front, as a correspondent for military newspapers. He wrote poetry and a volume of memoirs. He also provided the libretto for Yuri Shaporin's opera The Decembrists.
