= Domnino =

Domnino Домнино
- Village
- Location within Vladimir Oblast Location within Russia
- Coordinates: 55°18′N 41°51′E
- Country: Russia
- Region: Vladimir Oblast
- District: Melenkovsky District
- Time zone: UTC+3:00

Domnino (Russian: До́мнино) is a rural locality (a village) in Lyakhovskoye Rural Settlement, Melenkovsky District, Vladimir Oblast, Russia. The population was 12 as of 2010.

== Geography ==
Domnino is located 18 km (11 mi) east of Melenki (the district's administrative centre) by road. Bolshaya Sala is the nearest rural locality.
