= Yuri Arnold =

Russian composer (1811–1898)

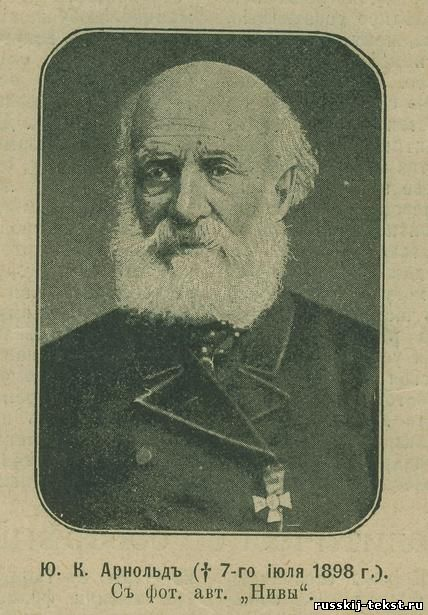
Yuri Karlovich Arnold

Yuri Karlovich Arnold, also Jury, Georgy, Yourij, and Arnol't, Arnol'd (Russian: Юрий (Георгий) Карлович Арнольд; November 13, 1811 – July 20, 1898), was a Russian composer, musicologist, music critic, choral conductor, theorist and music educator. There is some speculation that he was employed by the tsarist police and that some of the writings attributed to him were actually written by Peshenin, who was paid to keep it a secret. Also that some of his theories on the history of Russian church music are now seen as false. Among his students were Allemanov and Yu Mel’gunov.

== Biography ==
Yuri Karlovich Arnold was born in St. Petersburg, Petrograd. He studied political economy at the German University in Dorpat, Estonia, and served in the army from 1831–38 during the Polish campaign. After this, he decided to focus on a career in music and went to study harmony with Johann Leopold Fuchs and counterpoint with Joseph Hunke. In 1839, he won a Philharmonic Society award for his cantata Svetlana.

Starting in 1841, he contributed to numerous journals including the S.-Peterburgskiye vedomosti, Biblioteka dlya chteniya, Literaturnaya gazeta, Severnaya Pchela (Northern Bee), and Panteon under a variety of pseudonyms, including Meloman, Karl Karlovich, A. Yu., Harmonin, and Karl Smelïy. He moved to Leipzig in 1863 where he contributed to Signal and NZfM until 1870. He founded the Neue Allgemeine Zeitschrift für Theater und Musik. He also translated some opera librettos by Tchaikovsky and Glinka into German. His three-volume memoirs, published in 1892–93, are a guide to 60 years of Russian music not only relating to his life, but to the lives of other famous Russian musicians who lived during that time. He taught in Moscow and St. Petersburg from 1871 until his death in Karakesh, Crimea.

== Works ==
Yuri Karlovich Arnold wrote several sacred choral works, more than 50 romances, besides many operettas. He also wrote the cantata Svetlana (1839), the overture Boris Godunov (1861) and the piano piece Impromptu-Polka.

=== Operas ===
- Invalid (1852)
- Gypsy Girl (1853)
- The Last Day of Pompeii (1860)
- Treasure Trove (comic, perf. St. Petersburg, Petrograd, (2-1-1861)
- St. John the Baptist’s Night (1853)

Note:Both the manuscripts to Treasure Trove and St. John the Baptist's Night were lost in a fire at the St. Petersburg Opera Theater in 1859.

== Writings ==
- Love of a Teacher of Music (3 vols., Moscow., 1892–93)
- A music teacher’s love (St Petersburg, 1836) [published under pseudonym Carlo Carlini]
- Betrachtungen üer die Kunst der Darstellung in Musikdrama (Leipzig, 1867)
- Der Einfluss des Zeitgeistes auf die Entwicklung der Tonkunst (Leipzig, 1867)
- Die Tonkunst in Russland bis zur Einführung des abendländischen Music-und Notensystems (Leipzig, 1867)
- Über Schulen für dramatische und musikalische Kunst (Leipzig, 1867)
- 24 auserlesne Opern-Charaktere im Berug auf deren musikalischdeclamatorische, wie dramatisch-mimische Darstellung, analysirt und beleuchtet, i-xii (Leipzig, 1868)
- Über Franz Lizst’s oratorium ‘Die Heilige Elisabeth’ (1868)
- Nauka 0 muzïke na osnovanii ėsteticheskikh I fiziologicheskikh zakonov [The science of music on the basis of aesthetic and physiological laws] (Moscow, 1875)
- The theory of old Russian church and folk singing on the basis of authentic treatises and acoustic analysis, I (Moscow, 1880)
- The harmonization of old Russian church singing based on ancient Greek and Byzantine theory and acoustic analysis (Moscow, 1886)
- Die alten Kirchenmelodien historisch und akustisch entwickelt (Leipzig, 1898)
- The theory of voice training based on the old Italian school method and its practical application for good voice production, i-iii (St Petersburg, 1898)
