= Nestor Kukolnik =

Russian writer (1809–1868)

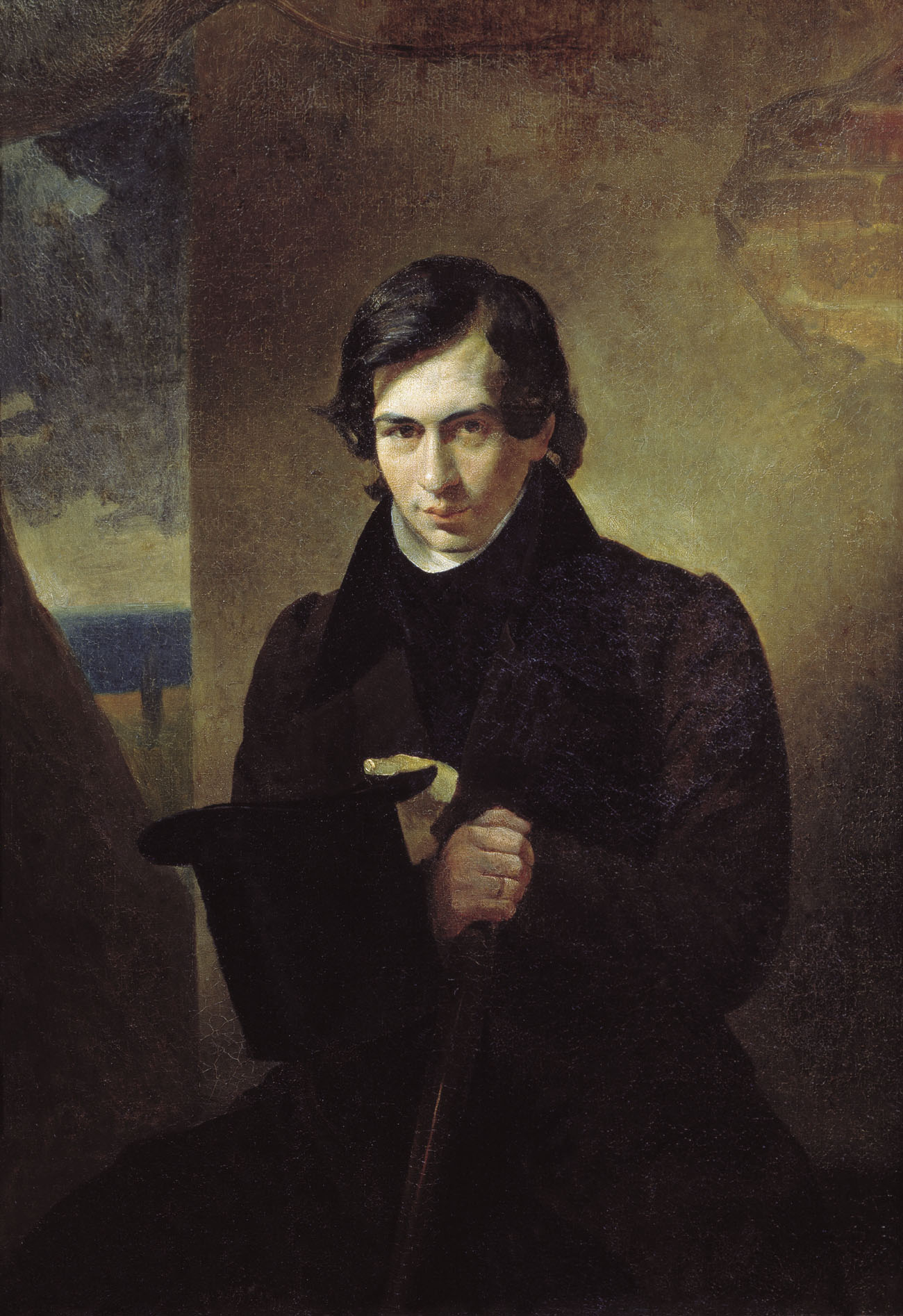
Portrait by Karl Bryullov, 1836

Nestor Vasilievich Kukolnik (Russian: Не́стор Васи́льевич Ку́кольник; 20 September [O.S. 8 September] 1809 – 20 December [O.S. 8 December] 1868) was a Russian playwright and prose writer of Carpatho-Rusyn origin. Immensely popular during the early part of his career, his works were subsequently dismissed as sententious and sentimental. Today, he is best remembered for having contributed to the libretto of the first Russian opera, A Life for the Tsar by Mikhail Glinka. Glinka also set many of his lyrics to music.

== Family background ==
Nestor Kukolnik was born on 8 September 1809 in the city of Saint Petersburg in the family of a professor lecturing at the Saint Petersburg Teacher's College. His father, Bazyli Wojciech Kukolnik, belonged to the ethnic group of Rusyns (Ruthenians) and came from an old noble family. A graduate of Vienna University, he also lectured in Poland.

In 1804, Bazyli Wojciech Kukolnik was invited to teach in Russia along with professors Ivan Orlay (Orlay János) and Mikhail Balugjanskij. Among his pupils were Grand Duke Constantine Pavlovich of Russia and Grand Duke Nikolai Pavlovich of Russia, the future emperor Nicholas I of Russia; Alexander I of Russia granted Vasily Kukolnik an estate in the Vilno Oblast and was Nestor Kukolnik's godfather at his baptism.

== Early life and studies ==
Nestor studied at the Nezhin Gymnasium of Higher Sciences in what is now Ukraine, founded earlier by Nestor's father. Nikolai Gogol studied at the same institution and they both played at the school theater. Kukolnik's literature activity started in gymnasium, where he wrote his first verses and dramas. After graduating from Nizhyn Gymnasium in 1829, he gave lessons at Vilnius Gymnasium, and, in 1831, moved with his brother Platon Kukolnik to Saint Petersburg, where he served at the Ministry of Finance.

== Literary activity ==
In 1833, Kukolnik's first play "Tortini" was published by Faddei Bulgarin, soon followed by fantasy drama "Torcuato Tasso", which resulted in his reputation as a legendary playwright in the capital. The turning point in his literary career came in 1834, after demonstration of patriotic drama "Ruka Vsevishnego Otechestvo Spasla" ("The God's Hand Saved The Motherland"), applauded by the Russian Emperor Nicolas I at the play's premiere. Inspired by this success, the writer produces historical play "Prince Mikhail Vasilievich Skopin-Shuysky". In 1836 he founded The Gazette of Fine Arts (Khudozhestvennaia gazeta) which was published in Saint Petersburg until 1842 and wrote more than two hundred articles on art.

Kukolnik's oeuvre is diverse. He experimented with multiple genres and formats: novels, historical tales, criticism, poetry and even music. He was a friend of Mikhail Glinka, who to set some of Kukolnik's verses (Hesitation, Skylark, and Passing Song, among others) to music. Dizzy from his success, he proclaimed that there were only three geniuses in Russia - himself as a writer, Mikhail Glinka as a composer, and Karl Bryullov as a painter.

== Resignation and later life in Taganrog ==
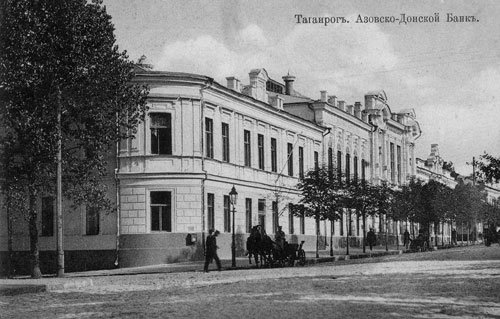
Residence of Nestor Kukolnik in Taganrog

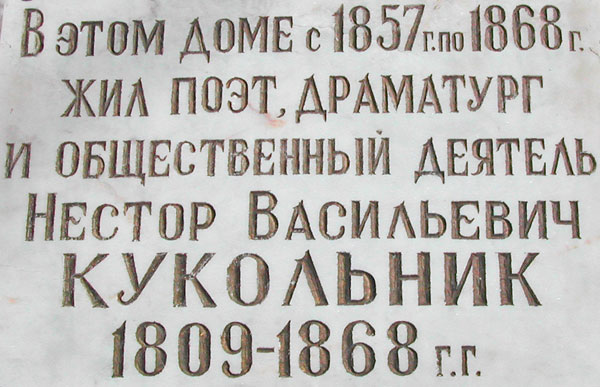
Memorial plate on Nestor Kukolnik's residence in Taganrog

In 1857, Nestor Kukolnik resigned and settled in Taganrog. There he continued his literary activity, but the public work played the key role of his life in that period. Nestor Vasilievich did a lot of work for education of Taganrog's society. It had an influence on the destiny of the city, making it into the centre of education in the South of Russia.

Nestor Kukolnik was the first to prove the need of university education in the Don Voisko Province and on Azov Sea. His offer to open a university in Taganrog was not successful, but later it proved to be an important foundation for opening the Imperial Novorossiya University in Odessa (1865). Kukolnik also proved necessity of local newspapers. It was one of the reasons to open newspaper-publishing houses not only in Taganrog, but also in Odessa and Rostov-on-Don. Since 1865 Nestor Kukolnik led the workgroup that proved necessity of a railroad line from Kharkov to Taganrog. This work was a success and Alexander II of Russia approved the project in 1868. He also was the first to raise the issue of environmental protection of the Gulf of Taganrog. But the related project encountered strong resistance from regional leadership and was not realized. Nestor Vasilievich assisted in opening the county court in Taganrog, open soon after his death in 1869.

Kukolnik died unexpectedly in Taganrog on December 8, 1868, when he and his wife were getting ready to go to the theatre. The writer was buried in Taganrog in his own estate.

In 1931, the remains of Nestor Kukolnik and his wife were defiled. Searching for jewelry, robbers opened the graves and threw away the remains. Unfortunately, it was not the only case of violation. In 1966 the city administration signed a decree and allowed the Public Joint-Stock Company "The Taganrog Boiler-Making Works 'Krasny Kotelshchik'" to build additional industrial areas on the territory of Kukolnik's estate. All the works started two years later, in 1968. Bulldozers razed to the ground Kukolnik's house and mixed his grave with mud and debris. The remains of the great Russian writer have been lost forever.

In 2008, within the framework of the writer's 200th birth anniversary, one of the streets in Taganrog was named after Kukolnik.

== Trivia ==
The word kukolnik (кукольник) is Russian for "puppeteer" or "puppet-maker".

In Dostoyevsky's novel Demons, the character of Varvara Petrovna Stavrogin uses Kukolnik (as portrayed in Briullov's portrait above) as the model for her idealized presentation of Stepan Verkhovensky.

== Sources ==
- "Кукольник, Нестор Васильевич" . Brockhaus and Efron Encyclopedic Dictionary (in Russian). 1906.
