= Vladimir Sollogub =

Russian writer (1813–1882)

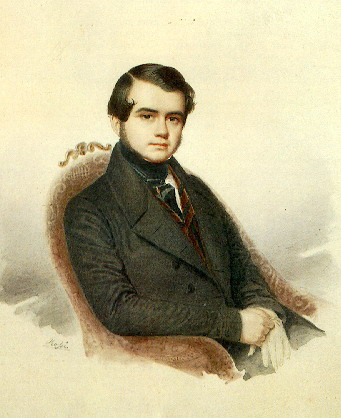
Vladimir Sollogub

Count Vladimir Alexandrovich Sollogub (Russian: Влади́мир Алекса́ндрович Соллогу́б; German: Woldemar Graf Sollogub (Sollohub); 20 August 1813 – 17 June 1882) was a minor Russian writer, author of novelettes, essays, plays, and memoirs.

Born in Saint Petersburg, his paternal grandfather was a Polish aristocrat, and he grew up in the midst of high society. He graduated from the University of Dorpat in 1834 and was attached to the Ministry of Internal Affairs the following year in Vienna. His literary career began in 1837 in the journal Sovremennik. In 1840 he married Sofya Mikhailovna Velgorskaya. In 1843 he visited Nice and met Gogol. From 1856 he was an Officer for Special Commissions in the imperial court; he took an interest in prison reform, and from 1875 was сhair of the Commission for the Reorganization of Prisons in Russia. In 1858 he was sent abroad to study European theater, and in 1877 he became an official historian at court.

Sollogub was a connoisseur of theatrical life and of St. Petersburg society. He hosted a well-known literary and musical salon where he brought to life the atmosphere of St. Petersburg of that era as related in his Memoirs (1887). He is best known for his 1845 novelette Tarantas ("The Tarantass"), "a satirical journey from Moscow to Kazan in a tumble-down traveling cart. The satire, superficial and uninspired, is directed against the ideas of the Slavophils and the unpractical dreaminess of the romantic idealists."

== Biography ==
=== Ancestry ===
Sollogub's origins were of the highest nobility, close to the court thanks to his grandmother Natalia L. Naryshkina (1761–1819). His grandfather, Yan Sollogub, served as an adjutant of the Polish king and was a prominent magnate in Lithuania. He increased his wealth to 80,000 souls by means of the marriage with Natalia Naryshkina, a daughter of the Russian Emperor's relative Lev Naryshkin. Alexander Sollogub (1787–1843), Vladimir's father and the son of Yan Sollogub, quickly wasted his share of the bequest. He held a civil rank of master of ceremonies (Russian: Церемониймейстер, from German "Zermonienmeister") at the court, however in public he was mainly known as a dandy. Pushkin mentioned his name ("Eternal Scollogub is having fun") in the drafts to the 1st chapter of Eugene Onegin. Alexander's love for the theater, music, and painting had a valuable impact on his son, Vladimir.

The mother of the author, Sofia Ivanovna Sollogub (maiden name: Arharova; 1791–1854), was admired by emperor Alexander I, who loved having conversations with her. Сalm and serious, she loved Russian literature and was the addressee of Pyotr Pletnyov's letter "A letter to countess S. I. S. about Russian poets." Vladimir's grandmother was Ekaterina Arharova (1755–1836), a prominent Saint Petersburg's lady, "the keeper of the old-Moscow traditions. Another grandfather, Ivan Arharov (1744–1815), was a military governor of Moscow. Therefore, the family of the author was related both to bureaucratic St. Petersburg and to lordly, patriarchal Moscow.

In childhood, due to his kinship to Alexey Olenin, who was a cousin of his grandmother Ekaterina Arharova, Vladimir became acquainted with a set of famous contemporary writers: Ivan Krylov, Nikolay Gnedich, Alexander Pushkin, and Alexander Griboyedov. This was the time when he started to esteem the arts.

=== Childhood and studying in Dorpat ===
Sollogub's education, to which his parents paid close attention, started at home. The list of his teachers included Pyotr Pletnev (Russian language and literature) and protoiereus Ioakim Kochetov (law of God). Vladimir's gouverneur was Ernest Charrière, a French playwright, historian, poet, and the future translator of Turgenev's "A Sportsman's Sketches." Ernest was the one who induced the future author's love to the literature.

Vladimir spent winters mostly in Saint Petersburg and summers in Pavlovsk. In both cities he socialized with peers from aristocratic society. Young Sollogub was jaunty and witty, and even though he looked quite plain at the time (as people remember), people often invited him to dinners because he was able to "revive and exhilarate". Among Vladimir's entertainments were participation in the court theater, amateur performances and tableau vivant, which were organized by his father, who also participated as a singer and actor.

In 1819–1820, Vladimir traveled to Paris with his parents and brother Lev. In the summer of 1822, the young boy went to his mother's estate, "Nikolskoe", Simbirsk Governorate. There he discovered for himself the world of the Russian province. The manager of the estate was Vasiliy Grigorovich (the father of Dmitry Grigorovich), with whom the writer would keep in touch between 1840–1860.

Having received the perfect home studying and wishing to pursue a diplomatic career, Vladimir entered the philosophical department of the University of Dorpat. The wealth of his family decreased at that time, so his life was modest. However, he didn't skip student games and tried to imitate Nikolay Yazykov, who had studied at the university earlier. Here in the university, Sollogub became acquainted with Vasily Zhukovsky, the family of Karamzin (especially with Andrey Karamzin who also was a student that time), Pyotr Vyazemsky and future surgeons Nikolay Pirogov and Fyodor Inozemtsev, and the future lawyers Pyotr Redkin, Pyotr Kalmikov, Ivan Zolotarev, Yuri Arnold. Sollogub became a habitué of several musical-literary salons hosted by landrat Karl Gotthard von Liphart and Professors Vasiliy Perevoshikov and Ivan Moyer. Besides studying, Sollogub played music, wrote plays, participated in amateur performances, and – all in all – lead a life of a "typical bursch".

Living and studying in Dorpat was a major event in Sollogub's life and was which was reflected in some of his works, e. g., "Dva Studenta" (Russian: "Два Студента", "Two Students"), "Aptekarsha" (Russian: "Аптекарша", "A Lady Chemist"), and a narrative "Neokonchennie Povesti" (Russian: "Неоконченные повести", "Unfinished stories"); and which would later make Sollogub close to Nikolay Yazykov. Summer holidays were spent in St. Petersburg and Pavlovsk, just as before his studying. Here in Pavlovsk in 1831, Sollogub became acquainted with Nikolai Gogol, who was, at that, time a gouverneur of Vladimir's cousin, Count Vasilchikov, who was suffering from dementia. In the same year, he met and became acquainted with Alexander Pushkin.

Sollogub graduated from the university as a "valid student", not as a "candidate." The author himself explained this outcome as the result of a combination of bad luck on exams and a conflict with a professor.

=== The beginning of career ===
==== Civil service ====
After the graduation from the university, Sollogub received a rank of Gubernial Secretary. He began his service in the Ministry of Foreign Affairs where he held the position of an attaché in the Russian embassy in Vienna. However, he didn't demonstrate an inclination towards diplomatic duties, so he returned to Russia, and on 19 January 1835 he started his career in the Ministry of Internal Affairs as an official "for special missions" (attached to the governor of Tver). Under his new duties, he traveled to Kharkiv, Smolensk, Vitebsk, and Tver, with a mission to create descriptions of the provinces. The mission to Tver also contained a task to search and collect information about the Old Believers. While traveling, Count Sollogub spent a lot of time not performing his duties but rather staying in his estates. Mikhail Bakunin mentioned this in his letter: "Spent the whole week alone with Sollogub in his old estate one hundred versts away from Tver. We read Hoffmann, drank 3 bottles of wine per day, and fantasized. When we became bored, we traveled to the Count's next estate..."

In the beginning of 1838, Sollogub focused on work in the minister's chancellery. On April 19, he was instructed to create a comprehensive statistical description of the Simbirsk governorate, which he successfully finished (with an interruption) in September 1839 and which is currently stored in the Russian State Historical Archive. On February 26, 1839, this task was interrupted when Sollogub was assigned with another task to investigate illegal logging in Velikoustuzhskiy and Vesyegonsky uezds, which he successfully finished by April 12 of the same year. In the end of May, he had another journey to Ustyuzhna, in which Sollogub wrote "And so this is my life... a big road by which I often have to ride in a cart". However, Sollogub abandoned neither secular nor literary life. He participated in both during his frequent visits to Saint Petersburg. The public knew him as a witty young man with perfect dancing skills, though as Avdotya Panaeva and Dmitry Grigorovich noticed, his behavior "varied."

Near the end of 1839, Sollogub was promoted from government clerk to valet de chambre. In 1840, Sollogub married Sofia Vielgorskoya, a daughter of Mikhail Vielgorsky. In 1842, Vladimir had already reached the rank of Collegiate Accessor and held the post of head clerk in the minister's chancellery, which he changed to a forwarder in the same year. With his wife, he traveled to Europe (Germany, Paris, Nice). His stay in Baden-Baden (July–August 1843) and Nice (autumn 1843 – winter 1844) was marked by the companionship of Alexandra Smirnova and Nikolay Gogol, who, after having read Sollogub's unfinished novel "Tarantas", gave Vladimir some literary advice. Perhaps, under the influence of Gogol, Sollogub decided to rework the novel.

Sollogub received the rank of Court Councillor in 1845 and then Collegiate councillor in 1848. On 30 January 1849, Vladimir resigned (for unknown reasons) and settled in Nikolskoe, occasionally visiting Moscow.

==== Literature ====
Sollogub first attempted to write at the age of 15. His first texts were full of saloon dilettantisms and imitations. They contained conventional epithets, and the characters were vague. These experiments included poems in Russian and French, couplets for home and student plays, epigrams, elegies, facetious poems, and translations in prose of Lord Byron's stanzas. His most prominent work of that time, in Andrey Nemzer's opinion, was the romantic poem "Stan" (Russian: Стан, Camp).

Vladimir joined Nikolay Karamzin's saloon (which members at the time were Alexander Pushkin, Vyazemsky, Ivan Turgenev, and, later, Mikhail Lermontov), which straitened his literary social network. This was where "Voldemar" (or "Vovo") Sollogub – as Karamzins calls him in their letters – read his first works in public. His first social novels were also read in saloons and to friends without being published.

In the first half of 1830th, before Sollogub's literary debut in "Sovremennik" with the tale "Tri Zheniha" (Russian: Три Жениха, Three Grooms, 1837), Vladimir's name had already been known in the circle of contemporary senior writers. So, in 1832, Sollogub was mentioned as a possible member of a new magazine that had been suggested by Zhukovsky. In 1836, Vladimir was in the list of probable collaborators for the Russkiy Sbornik (Russian: Русский Сборник, Russian Digest) magazine of Andrey Krayevsky and Vladimir Odoyevsky, and to Starina and Novizna (Russian: Старина и Новизна, Old and New) of Vyazemsky, which was never published. In addition, the author also attempted to write a libretto to A Life for the Tsar, an opera by Mikhail Glinka, but the composer did not like it.

Researchers suggest that in the middle of the 1830s the relationship between Sollogub and Pushkin developed beyond secular acquaintance, which explains Vladimir's participation in "Otechestvennye Zapiski". Even after Pushkin's death, Sollogub still remained in the "circle of Pushkin". This fact can be confirmed by his publications in "Sovremennik" ("Two Students", Russian: "Два Студента", 1838), in "Literary addition to the 'Russian Invalid'" ("Seryozha", Russian: "Сережа", 1838; it was warmly received by the public, including Vissarion Belinsky), and in the renewed "Otechestvennye Zapiski".

He was a permanent visitor of the salons hosted by Nikolay Karamzin and Alexander Odoevsky. Researchers note the influence of Odoyevsky's prose, both musical and secular, on Sollogub's narrative "The History of Two Shoes" (Russian: "История двух калош"), which was published in "Otechestvennye Zapiski" in 1839 and which was very popular among readers. This put the Count into the circle of the most well-known writers of the time and made him known as a "mediator between the aristocracy and the turning-to-democratic literacy." On the other hand, his visits to Karamzins played their role too. It was probably there, in the beginning of 1839, that Sollogub became closer to Yuriy Lermontov. Another salon that Sollogub visited was hosted by the family of Velgorskiy, which became for him the "third school" and taught Vladimir to "understand" the art. Eventually, Sollogub became a "leading singer" there, because he "brought the Russian spirit, the Russian speech, and interest to the Russian literature into this house." Vadim Vatsurov suggested that Sollogub's decision to move from the shallowing "Sovremennik" of Pletnyov to "Otechestvennye Zapiski" of Alexander Kraevsky, Odoyevskiy, and Belinsky was an act of self-determination. Soon, Sollogub's name became firmly associated with this magazine.

In the end of September, beginning of November 1839, Sollogub went to Kazan with the painter Prince Grigory Gagarin. The painter's cousin Prince Ivan Gagarin wrote to Vyzaemsky on 30 September 1839 about this art tandem as a "union of a novelist and a painter for the utilization of couleur locale." His words described the initial plan for the future publication. In winter 1940, the work was discussed in literary and musical salons, e.g., in the salons of Karamzins and Odoyevsky. In "Pushkin's circle", the text received a sceptical reception. However, seven chapters of "Tarantas" were published in "Otechestvennye Zapiski" (No.10) with an editorial note about the publication of the new book. In 1840, Sollogub published "Bolshoy Svet" (Russian: "Большой Свет", "Noble Society"), which was written, as Sollogub reminisced, at the order of Grand Duchess Maria Nikolaievna and was dedicated to her (Sollogub often wrote vaudevilles and couplets for the court). One of the main character's prototype was Lermontov, who made fun of the Grand Dutchess (or, according to other sources, of the Empress) on the masquerade on the night of 31 December 1839, and the plot's motive was Sollogub's love to S. Vengerskaya, a lady-in-waiting of the Empress. The second part was written after almost a year.

The next year (1841) was remarkable for Sollogub, as the first part of the digest of his works, "For the Upcoming Dream" (Russian: "На сон грядущий"), was published in Saint Petersburg. The second part was published in 1843. The digest included about 20 of the writer's narratives. As it had obtained great popularity, it was re-published in 1844-1845 (this was very uncommon at the time). The 2nd edition included "Unfinished Narratives" (Russian: "Неоконченные повести"), and it was highly praised in Belinsky's review. Ivan Kireyevsky suggested that the distinguishing features of the digest were its "style and genuine feelings." In his review, he wrote that the narratives were "very intriguing, the language was simple and correct, the plots were vivid, and the feelings were sensuous." Sollogub's "A Lady Chemist" (Russian: "Аптекарша") was praised by Belinsky in 1842. "It was a long time since we had read something, in Russian, that contained such a beautiful, deeply humanitarian content; delicate diplomacy, and the mastery of the shape..." he wrote. The middle of the 1840s was the time when Sollogub gained the most of his popularity. As Ivan Panaev reminisced, "he became the most favorite and fashionable writer."

In 1842, Sollogub published the article "About conscious of a writer," in which he wrote, with a negative tone, about the commercial part of the literary life. Initially, it was harsher than in the final, printed version. Faddey Bulgarin wrote a response to the article, and since that time he became Sollogub's opponent. Vladimir also attempted to write in styles other than of a narrative. So, he wrote a physiological essay "A Bear" (Russian: "Медведь"), a vaudeville "A Lion" (Russian: "Лев", 1841), a lyrical confession "An Occurrence on a Railroad" (Russian: "Случай на железной дороге", 1842). Sollogub's memorialists noted different set of features of the writer. Thus, along with aristocracy and, sometimes, even hauteur, there was awere the strong love to literature and the earnest interest for new talent. He highly esteemed Dostoyevsky's "Poor Folk" and Ostrovsky's "It's a Family Affair-We'll Settle It Ourselves," although later, as he wrote to Countess Sofia Tolstova, he would consider Ostrovsky a mediocre writer. Sollogub warmly welcomed Turgenev and Aleksey Tolstoy, too. Generally, all prominent writers were awarded with nice comments in his memoirs (e.g., he wrote about Nekrasov's literary activity as a "brilliant one"). Sollogub initiated the charity called "The charity of attendance of the poor people under the leadership of Duke Maximilian de Beauharnais" in 1846. In December 1850, Sollogub became acquainted with Lev Tolstoy. Vladimir often visited Nizhniy Novgorod where he stayed at Nikolay Sheremetyev's place. In autumn 1844, Sollogub wrote a libretto for "Undina," an opera of Alexey Lvov, whose plot was based on Zhukovsky's interpretation of Friedrich de la Motte Fouqué's fairy tale. The performance occurred in 1848 and was recommenced in 1860. Tchaikovsky later used this libretto in his own opera of the same name.

Sollogub retired in Bad Homburg, Germany, where he died in 1882.

== English translations ==
- The Tarantas: Travelling Impressions of Young Russia, Chapman and Hall, London, 1850.
- His Hat and Cane: A Comedy in One Act, Walter H. Baker, Boston, 1902.
- "The Snowstorm", (story), from Russian Romantic Prose: An Anthology, Translation Press, 1979.
