= Mikhail Mirkovich =

Imperial Russian regimental commander and ethnographer

Mikhail Fyodorovich Mirkovich
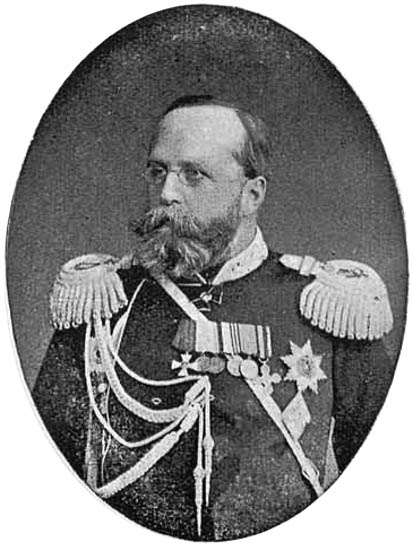
- Born: September 17, 1836
- Died: March 24, 1891 (aged 54) Saint Petersburg, Russian Empire
- Allegiance: Russian Empire
- Branch: Imperial Russian Army
- Commands: 14th Infantry Regiment; Volinsky Regiment
- Conflicts: January Uprising; Russo-Turkish War

Mikhail Fyodorovich Mirkovich (September 17, 1836 – March 24, 1891) was an Imperial Russian regimental commander and ethnographer. He participated in the wars in Poland and against the Ottoman Empire. He is the son of Fedor Yakovlevich Mirkovich.

== Biography ==
He is the son of the Grodno, Minsk and Białystok governor-general, General of Infantry Fedor Yakovlevich Mirkovich. Mikhail Fedorovich Mirkovich was born on 17 September 1836 into a noble Serbian family on an ancestral estate in Tula gubernia.

He received his education in the Corps of Pages in Saint Petersburg. Mirkovich's academic success in the sciences was noticed by a superior who advised Mirkovich to enter the Nicholas General Staff Academy after graduation. He graduated from the Page Corps on 17 June 1854 with the rank of cornet in the Life Guard Horse Regiment. He was set on applying to the prestigious Military Topographic mapping department at the General Staff Academy, but in 1854 the Crimean War was in its ninth month and there were no admissions to the department; it seems admissions would only take place after the war was over. In the same year, he was part of the composition of troops assigned to defend the coast of the Baltic Sea against Charles John Napier's Baltic blockade and from a possible landing by a combined Anglo-French force.

In May 1857, he was seconded to the headquarters of the Separate Guards Corps to prepare for entering the General Staff Academy. On 24 December 1857, he successfully passed the academy exams and enrolled as a student. Mirkovich's time at the academy is mentioned by an engraved plaque bearing the names of the most accomplished pupils. During Mirkovich's sojourn in the academy, he showed great tendencies for mathematical sciences and kept close relationships with outstanding students in Geodesics. During his stay at the academy, he was promoted to lieutenant and shortly after captain.

Captain Mirkovich graduated from the Academy on 12 June 1860. The following year he was incorporated into the Officer Corps of the General Staff under the direction of the Chief of the Main Staff. From 27 September 1861, he was Senior Adjutant of the 2nd Infantry Corps in the Crimea and from 22 March 1862, he was appointed Headquarters Officer for special assignments to the Chief of Staff of the 1st Army. From 10 July 1862 Mirkovich was given the post of special assignments at the Military Headquarters of the troops soon to be relocated in the Kingdom of Poland (Tsarstvo Pol'skoe). His start date coincided with the January Uprising. The HQ in which he served was transferred to Imperial Russia's Poland to bolster the Russian troops. In the period from 20 April and May 1864, Mirkovich as senior HQ adjutant, also took part in combat operations against Polish insurgents, for which he was awarded the Order of Saint Anna, 3rd degree, and on 6 December 1863, he was promoted colonel. The following year, he was awarded the Order of Saint Stanislav, 2nd degree (the imperial crown to this order was granted in 1866).

On 19 March 1864 Mirkovich was appointed an official of special assignments VII class with the Chief of the General Staff at Saint Petersburg. In January 1867 he was named Chief of Staff of the 5th Infantry Division, a post he held until 1869. Then, he was named commander of the 14th Olonets Infantry Regiment, a command he held for the next seven years. And in January 1876, he was in command of the Volinsky Regiment with which he marched into European Turkey. He was promoted major general on 17 June 1877. During this time he was a recipient of multiple awards and decorations (the orders of Saint Anna, 2nd degree in 1870; Saint Vladimir, 4th degree in 1872; and Saint Vladimir, 3rd degree in 1874).

On 12 October 1877 Mirkovich participated at the Siege of Plevna and distinguished himself in the capture of Volyn elevation (Volinska Visochina) on 21–28 November 1877. After the fall of Pleven, the Volinsky Regiment Life Guards was moved to the battlefields in the Balkans.

During an attack on a Turkish position in the Battle of Tashkessen, he received two wounds, one in the back of the head and the other in the right shoulder, while leading the offensive of the 2nd Brigade of the 3rd Guards Infantry on 31 December 1877 (or 19 December Julian Calendar). In the attack on the fortified redoubt the men under his leadership were able to dislodge the enemy completely. Soon, his wounds quickly healed and at the end of February 1878, Mirkovich returned to the regiment. On April 11, 1878, he was awarded a golden weapon with the inscription "For Bravery" and on May 5, 1878, he was awarded the Order of Saint George, 4th degree. In the same year (1878) he was granted the Order of Saint Stanislav, 1st degree. Mirkovich was enlisted in the retinue of His Majesty on 21 August 1879. From February 19, 1881, Mirkovich was Chief of Staff of the Vilna Military District, and from August 30, 1881, promoted to lieutenant general, Mirkovich was transferred to the General Staff Building in Saint Petersburg, where he was made Assistant to the Chief of the Main Staff General. He was also a member of the Military-Scientific Committee and the Mobilization Committee. In this position, Mirkovich was awarded the orders of Saint Anna, 1st degree (in 1882), Saint Vladimir, 2nd degree (in 1885) and the White Eagle (in 1889).

He died on the night of March 24, 1891, in Saint Petersburg, and was buried in the Novodevichy Cemetery. He was 55.

== Awards ==
- Order of Saint Anna, 3rd class, 1863
- Order of Saint Stanislaus (House of Romanov), 2nd class, 1864
- Order of Saint Anna, 2nd class, 1870
- Order of Saint Vladimir, 4th class, 1872
- Order of Saint Vladimir, 3rd class, 1874
- Gold Sword for Bravery, 1878
- Order of Saint George, 4th degree, 1878
- Order of Saint Stanislaus (House of Romanov), 1st class, 1878
- Order of Saint Anna, 1st class, 1882
- Order of Saint Vladimir, 2nd class, 1885
- Order of the White Eagle (Russian Empire), 1889

Preceded by	Chief of Staff of the 5th Infantry Division; 1867–1869	Succeeded by
Preceded by	Commander of the 14th Infantry Regiment; 1869–1876	Succeeded by
Preceded by	Commander of the Volinsky Regiment; 1876–1881	Succeeded by

== See also ==
- Fedor Yakovlevich Mirkovich
- Ivan Adamovich
- Georgi Emmanuel
- Mikhail Miloradovich
- Nikolay Depreradovich
- Ilya Duka
- Ivan Lukačević (soldier)
- Matija Zmajević
- Marko Voinovich
- Semyon Zorich
- Peter Tekeli
- Simeon Piščević
- Simeon Končarević
- Jovan Albanez
- Jovan Šević
- Anto Gvozdenović
- Dmitry Horvat
- Sava Vladislavich
- Dejan Subotić

== Sources ==
- Волков С. В. Генералитет Российской империи. Энциклопедический словарь генералов и адмиралов от Петра I до Николая II. Том II. Л—Я. М., 2009
- Глиноецкий Н. П. Исторический очерк Николаевской академии Генерального штаба. СПб., 1882
- Исмаилов Э. Э. Золотое оружие с надписью «За храбрость». Списки кавалеров 1788–1913. М., 2007
- Милорадович Г. А. Список лиц свиты их величеств с царствования императора Петра I по 1886 год. СПб., 1886
- Полный список шефов, полковых командиров и офицеров лейб-гвардии Конного полка с 1731 по 1886 год. СПб., 1886
- Старчевский А. А. Памятник Восточной войны 1877—1878 гг. СПб., 1878
- Фрейман О. Р. Пажи за 183 года (1711–1984). Биографии бывших пажей с портретами. Фридрихсгамн, 1894
