= Peter Ivelich =

Serb Montenegrin Russian general

Count Peter Ivanovich Ivelich
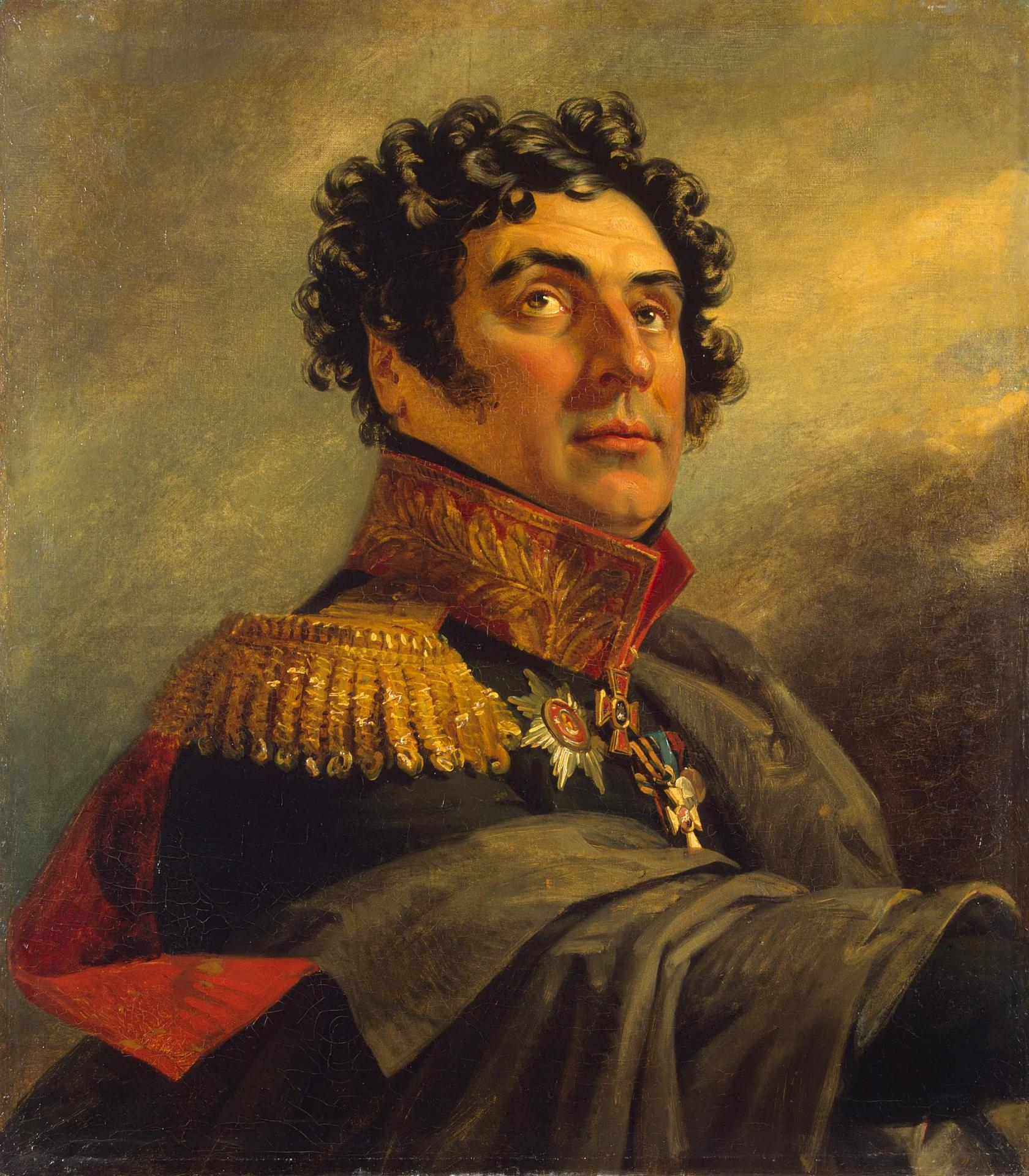
- Portrait by George Dawe in the Military Gallery of the Winter Palace
- Born: 1772; Risan, Venetian Albania
- Died: after 1850; Russia
- Military career
- Allegiance: Russian Empire
- Branch: Army
- Service years: 1788–1815
- Rank: Major General
- Wars: Russo-Turkish War (1787-1792); War of the Fourth Coalition; Finnish War; Patriotic War of 1812; Battle of Vitebsk; Battle of Smolensk; Battle of Borodino
- Awards: Order of St. George 4th class, Order of St. Vladimir 3rd class, Order of St. Anna 1st class

Count Peter Ivanovich Ivelich or Peter Ivelich IV (Russian: Пётр Ивелич, also known as Pyotr Ivanovich Ivelich IV; 1772 - after 1851) was a Serb Montenegrin who ranks among the most important Russian generals who fought during the Napoleonic invasion of Russia. His portrait was added to the Military Gallery of the Winter Palace along with other participants in the Patriotic War of 1812. His uncles are count Marko Ivelich (Ivelich I), major-general Ivan Konstantinovich Ivelich (Ivan Ivelich III) and colonel Simeon Konstantinovich Ivelich (Simeon Ivelich II).

== Biography ==
Ivelich was born to a Serbian family in Risan in the Venetian Republic (now Montenegro) in 1772. He was the nephew of Count Marko Ivelich.

As a captain in the army of the Venetian Republic, he transferred to the Imperial Russian military service on 15 June 1788 as a lieutenant in the Nasheburg Infantry Regiment. In three months he was promoted to captain on 9 September 1788 for recruiting 186 Slav volunteers, and transferred to the Finnish Chasseurs Corps and, on 25 March 1793, to the Shirvan Infantry Regiment. He served in the Russo-Turkish War of 1787 and continued to rise through the ranks. He was promoted to the rank of major and appointed the commander of the Shirvan Musketeer Regiment on 17 January 1799.

He was promoted to colonel on 10 August 1800. He fought the French in Austria (1805) and Prussia (1807). On 24 August 1806, he was appointed chef of the Brest Musketeer Regiment.

Ivelich fought the French in Prussia during the War of the Fourth Coalition and then against the Swedes in the Finnish War of 1808, during which he was promoted to major general and was awarded the Order of St. George for bravery. He participated in the Battle of Lemo against the Swedes (1808-1809); based on merit, on 18 October 1808, he was elevated to major general. He participated in the Patriotic War of 1812 and served in multiple major battles, including Borodino, at which he was severely wounded.

In 1812, as a major general, he participated in battles at Vitebsk, Smolensk, and Valutino. In the Battle of Borodino, he sustained bullet wounds in the right shoulder and on the right side. After recovery, he participated in more battles. In the campaign of 1813, he fought near Dresden and Bautzen.

He participated in the battles of the Great Patriotic War. Between May 1813 and February 1815 he was put on a medical recovery list. In 1815 he became Brigade Commander in the 17th Infantry Division.

On 12 December 1816 (Old Calendar), he took his military retirement on medical grounds, left the service with the uniform and full salary, and joined uncle Marko Ivelich in a business venture with the Russian-American Company. The emperor granted him a large plot of land with serfs in the Tobolsk Governorate.

He died at Tara, Imperial Russia, sometime after 1850.

== Ranks, decorations, and awards ==
Russian Ranks

- Lieutenant - 15 June 1788
- Captain - 9 September 1788
- Major - 17 January 1799
- Lieutenant Colonel - 22 April 1799
- Colonel - 10 August 1800
- Major General - 18 October 1808

Decorations and awards

- Order of St. George
- Order of Saint Vladimir
- Order of Saint Anna

== See also ==
- Serbs in Russia
- Peter Mikhailovich Kaptzevich
- Andrei Miloradovich
- Jovan Horvat
- Nikolay Depreradovich
- Ivan Adamovich
- Ilya Duka
- Ivan Lukačević (soldier)
- Jovan Tekelija
- Matija Zmajević
- Marko Ivanovich Voinovich
- Jovan Albanez
- Jovan Šević
- Simeon Piščević
- Semyon Zorich
- Georgi Emmanuel
- Anto Gvozdenović
- Mikhail Miloradovich
- Pavle Julinac
- Dmitry Horvat
- Nikolai Dimitrievich Dabić
- Nikolai Kuznetsov (admiral)
