= Nikolay Vuich =

Russian general (1765–1836)

Nikolay Vasilyevich Vuich
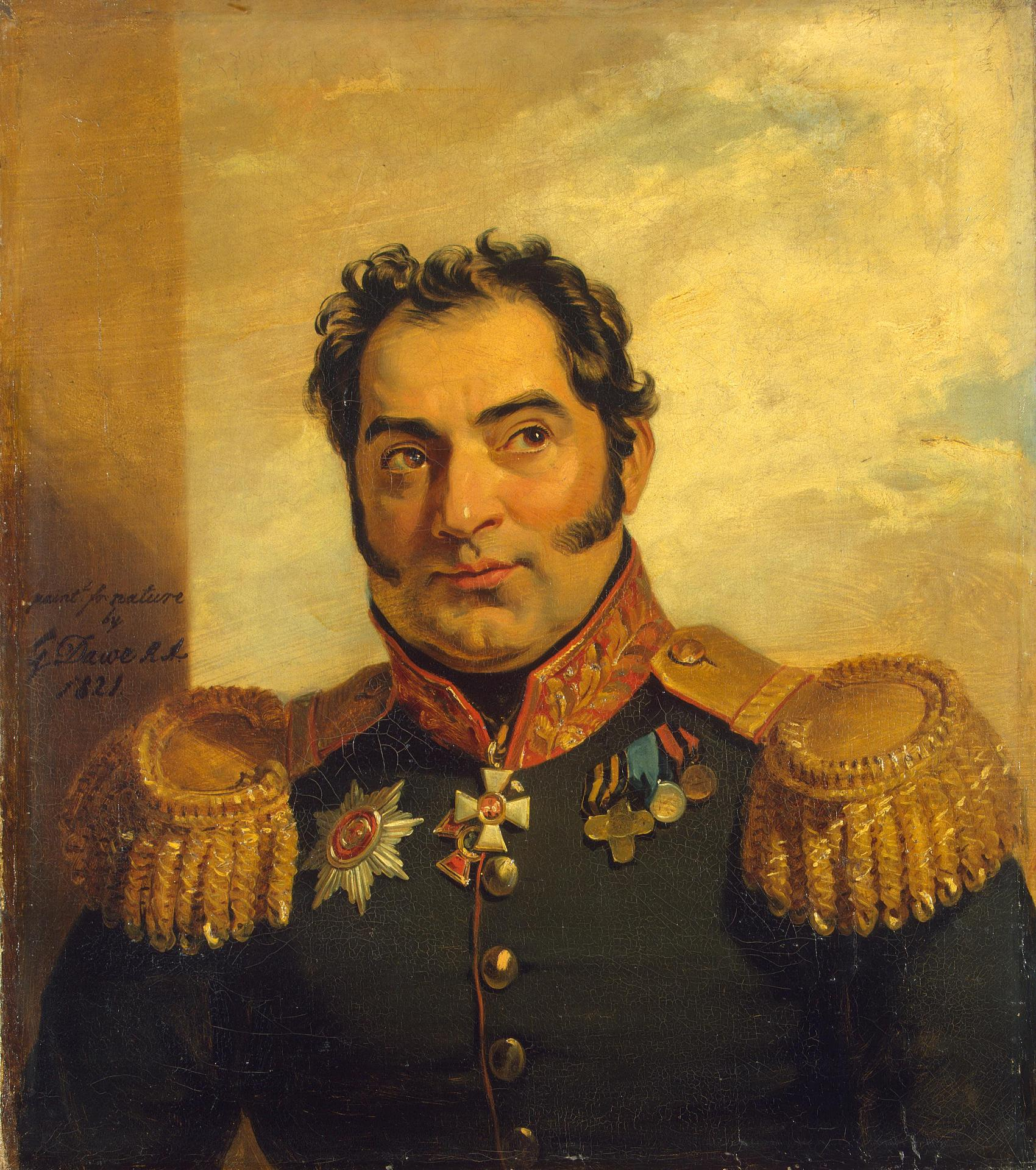
- Portrait by George Dawe in the Military Gallery of the Winter Palace
- Born: 1765; Nizhyn, Russian Empire
- Died: 27 March 1836 (aged 70–71); Nizhyn, Russian Empire
- Military career
- Allegiance: Russian Empire
- Branch: Army
- Service years: 1776–1828
- Rank: Lieutenant General
- Wars: Russo-Turkish War (1787–1792); Finnish War; Napoleonic Wars; Battle of Borodino; Battle of Maloyaroslavets
- Awards: Order of St. George; Order of St. Anna; Golden Sword for Bravery

Nikolay Vasilyevich Vuich (Russian: Никола́й Васи́льевич Ву́ич; 1765–27 March 1836) was an Imperial Russian general who fought in the Russo-Swedish War, Russo Turkish War, the Polish campaign and the Napoleonic Wars. He distinguished himself in all the wars in defense of Imperial Russia and contributed his might in the success of the Coalition forces against Napoleon. His portrait now hangs at the 1812 Military Gallery of the Winter Palace.

== Biography ==
His parents moved to Russia from Serb lands in the mid-18th century. Russian military service records show that he enlisted in the 12th Akhtyrsky Hussar Regiment on 12 December 1777. He moved to the Belarusian Yaeger Corps on 8 April 1787 with the rank of ensign.

In 1790, he was made captain for the assault on the fortress of Izmail. For bravery exhibited in the Polish-Russian War of 1792, he received the rank of major. He was commander of the 11th (previously 12th) Chasseurs Regiment (from 10 September 1800, with a break from 27 March to 28 August 1803). He was promoted to the rank of colonel on 18 September 1803.

In the 1806–1807 campaign in Poland, with the rank of colonel, he was decorated for bravery at Eylau and against the Swedes. Later, in 1812 Vuich fought at Vitebsk and Smolensk with distinction.

=== Battle of Borodino ===
Under commander-in-chief Barclay de Tolly in the Battle of Borodino, Vuich was ordered to mount a bayonet charge to gain control of a bridge over the Kolocha River. Colonel Vuich, whose Jaeger Brigade was closest to the bridge, had only eight battalions but they were intact, and the French were repulsed with heavy casualties. His sappers then blew up the bridge. At the same time, another Russian general Nikolay Raevsky needed help and three Jaeger regiments under Vuich's command went to assist Raevsky to protect the right wing of the Russian Army, better known as the "Raevsky Redoubt". That year (21 November 1812) Vuich was elevated to major general.

=== Last period ===
In the second period of the war, Vuich participated in the attack on the city of Vereya, in the Battle of Maloyaroslavets and the Battle of Krasnoi. For exceptional bravery demonstrated at Maloyaroslavets, he received from the Tsar the Golden Weapon with diamonds. He participated in 1813 and 1814 campaigns against Napoleonic France garnering the Order of St. George, 3rd Class (awarded on 30 March 1813), and taking command of the 24th Infantry Division. Appointed commander of the 3rd Brigade of the 24th Infantry Division, Vuich was part of the Northern Army in the campaign of 1813–1814 that participated in the battles of Dennewitz, Leipzig,Craonne, Laon and the taking of Paris, for which he was awarded Order of Saint Anna, 1st degree, and Order of St. George, 3rd class, as well as diamond signs to the Order of Saint Anna, 1st degree.

On 27 November 1816, he became the head of the 24th Infantry Division and on 11 November 1827, the 18th Infantry Division. He was ennobled on 28 November 1829.

Nikolay Vasilyevich Vuich died in 1836.

His grandson Nicholas Vuich was a Russian senator during the reign of Czar Nicholas II of Russia.

== Awards and decorations ==
- Order of St. Anna, 1st degree with diamonds
- Order of St. Vladimir, 3rd degree
- Order of St. George, 3rd degree
- The Cross for Izmail
- Golden Weapon "For Bravery" with diamonds
- The distinction "for XXX years of immaculate service"

== See also ==
- Ivan Shevich
- Andrei Miloradovich
- Avram Ratkov
- Ivan Adamovich
- Nikolay Bogdanov
- Ilya Duka
- Mikhail Miloradovich
- Peter Ivelich
- Georgi Emmanuel
- Jovan Albanez
- Anto Gvozdenović
- Fedor Yakovlevich Mirkovich
- Marko Ivelich
- Rajko Depreradović
- Andrei Miloradovich

== Annotations ==
1. Also spelt Nikolaj Vasiljevič Vujič (Николај Васиљевич Вујич) and Nikolaj Vasiljević Vujić (Николај Васиљевић Вујић) in Serbian.

== Literatura ==
- Sytin, Ivan (1911–1915). Военная энциклопедия Сытина [Sytin Military Encyclopedia]. Saint Petersburg: Ivan Sytin.
