= Marko Voinovich =

Russian admiral (1750–1807)

Count Marko Ivanovich Voinovich
- Марко Ивановић Војновић / Ма́рко Ива́нович Во́йнович
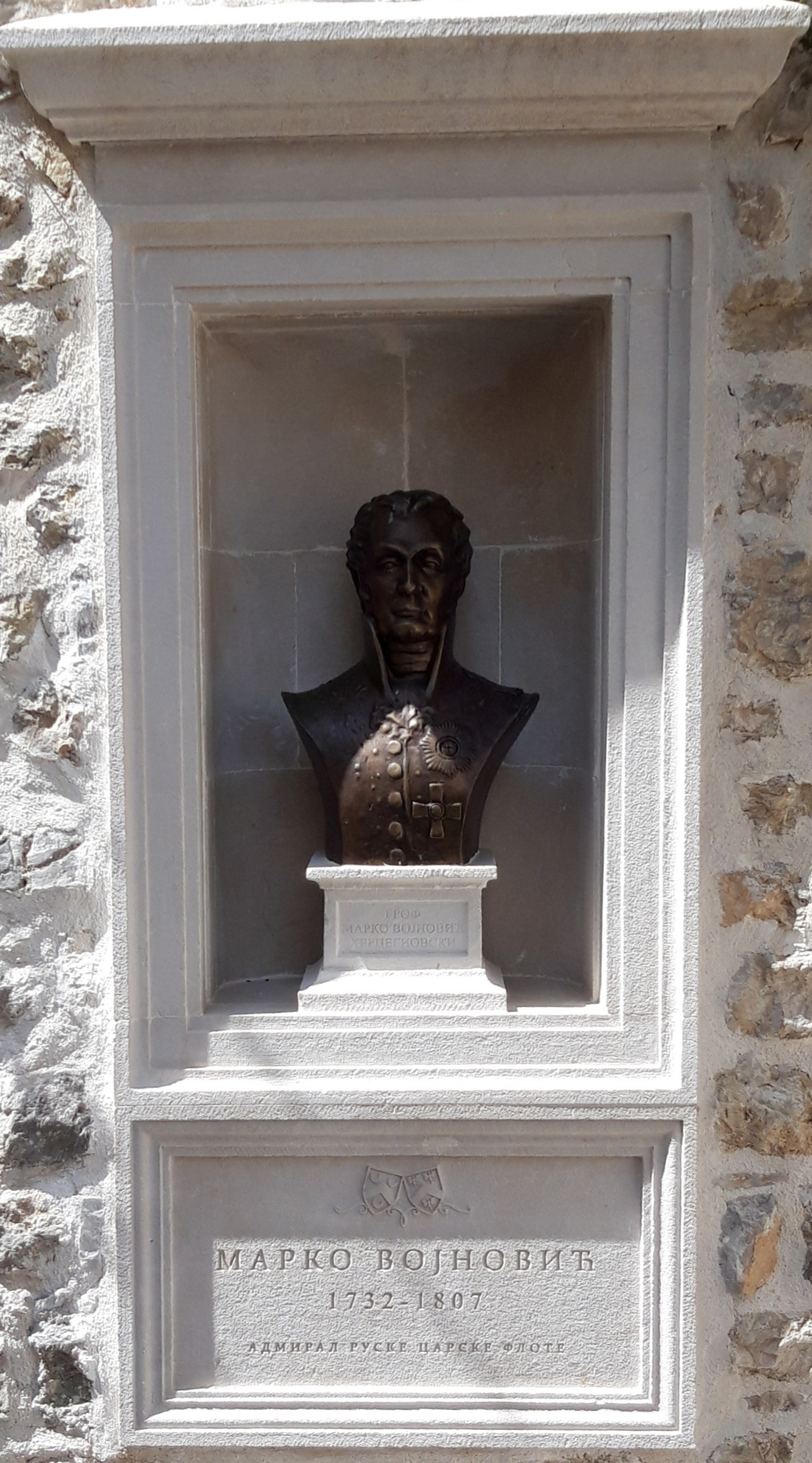
- Bust of Voinovich in Herceg Novi
- Born: 1732; Herceg Novi, Republic of Venice
- Died: 1807 (aged 74–75); Moscow, Moscow Governorate, Russian Empire
- Relatives: Vojnović noble family
- Military career
- Allegiance: Russian Empire
- Branch: Imperial Russian Navy
- Service years: 1770–1805
- Rank: Admiral
- Commands: Black Sea Fleet
- Conflicts: Russo-Turkish War (1768–1774); Astarabad Expedition of 1781–1782 (POW) until 1782; Russo-Turkish War (1787–1792); Battle of Fidonisi

Count Marko Ivanovich Voinovich (Note: The surname is also romanized as Voynovich) (Russian: Ма́рко Ива́нович Во́йнович; Serbian: Марко Ивановић Војновић, Marko Ivanović Vojnović; 1732/1750–1807) was a Serbian and Russian admiral of the Russian Imperial Navy. He was one of the founders of the Black Sea Fleet.

== Life ==
Voinovich was born in Herceg Novi, Republic of Venice (now Montenegro). He was a member of the Voinović noble family, a Serb family recognized as nobility by Venice, Trieste in the Habsburg monarchy, and Imperial Russia.

In 1770 Voinovich was accepted into the Russian Navy as an ensign and saw distinguished service in the Mediterranean expedition of Russian Navy during the Russo-Turkish War (1768–1774).

In 1780 Voinovich was appointed the Commander of the Caspian Flotilla He led an expedition to the Caspian Sea in 1781 and discovered offshore oil and gas deposits near Chilov Island. That same year, he requested permission from the Iranian warlord Agha Mohammad Khan (later Shah of Iran) to found a trading post at Ashraf (today's Behshahr). Agha Mohammad refused, but Voinovich went on to establish a temporary settlement at Qaraduvin and the Ashurada islands. The khan then invited Voinovich and his officers to visit him in Astarabad, where they were held hostage until Voinovich sent orders to his men to dismantle and abandon the settlement.

In 1783 Voinovich was appointed the commander of the first battleship of the nascent Black Sea Fleet. In 1785 he became the commander of Sevastopol Squadron. He fought in the Black Sea against the Turkish Navy led by Hassan Pasha in 1788. From the end of 1789 to the beginning 1790 Voinovich was the Chief of the Black Sea Fleet. Although the Russian Navy won the Battle of Fidonisi under his command, his actions in the Russo-Turkish War (1787–1792) were considered indecisive and he was dismissed from command of the Fleet in March 1790.

In 1797 Voinovich became a member of the Black Sea Admiralty Administration. He was appointed a full Admiral in 1801 and retired in 1805.

== See also ==
- Serbs in Russia
- Ivan Adamovich
- Matija Zmajević
- Sava Vladislavich
- Semyon Zorich
- Peter Tekeli
- Georgi Emmanuel
- Simeon Piščević
- Jovan Albanez
- Simeon Končarević
- Jovan Šević
- Mikhail Miloradovich
- Anto Gvozdenović
- Ilya Duka
- Dmitry Horvat
- Marko Ivelich
- Nikolai Dimitrievich Dabić
- Nikolai Kuznetsov (admiral)

== Sources ==
- "Войнович, Марко Иванович" . Brockhaus and Efron Encyclopedic Dictionary (in Russian). 1906.
- Martinović, Dušan J. (2003). "Admirali i generali Vojnovići u ruskoj vojsci". Project Rastko Boka (in Serbian).
