= Nikolay Bogdanov =

Russian general (1751–1829)

Nikolay Ivanovich Bogdanov
- Николай Иванович Богданов
- Born: 28 August 1751; Slavo-Serbia
- Died: 16 March 1829 (aged 77); Moscow, Imperial Russia
- Military career
- Allegiance: Russian Empire
- Branch: Army
- Rank: Lieutenant General
- Awards: Order of St. George 3rd class

Nikolay Ivanovich Bogdanov (Russian: Николай Иванович Богданов; 28 August 1751 - 16 March 1829) was a Russian general who participated in the wars against Napoleonic France. He received numerous awards and decorations for his work and with his experience also later fought the Ottoman Turks. In the Napoleonic Wars, he took part in the hard-fought Battle of Borodino. Bogdanov also served as Governor of Tula Governorate.

== Biography ==
Nikola Ivanovich Bogdanov's origins are from the ranks of Serbian nobility in Slavo-Serbia. On 27 March 1795, Bogdanov was awarded the Order of St. George, 4th degree "For the zealous service and brave deeds rendered during the defeat of the Polish insurgents" in the Vilnius uprising and during the storming of the city's fortifications, where he, commanding the guns entrusted to him on the 8th through the 31st of July 1794 contributed to the Russian victory with the taking of Vilnius.

Bogdanov rose to a major general in October 1798 and served as chef of the 8th Horse Artillery Regiment from 7 March 1800 to 27 August 1801 (in September 1801, Gregorian Calendar). He commanded the Russian Artillery Regiment at the Battle of Austerlitz in 1805. Later, he took his leave from the army and served as the civil governor of Tula from 1811 to 1814. Before the Battle of Borodino, Bogdanov was recalled to duty, and a new officer (Major General I. I. Miller) was put in charge of the Tula's people's militia, also known as Narodnoe Opolcheniye.

He was already a lieutenant general (1807) and a member of the Privy Council (1808), and civil governor of Tula (1811) shortly before the Battle of Borodino. And during the fateful battle itself, he protected the right wing of the Russian Army, better known as the Raevsky Redoubt, winning the Order of St. George, 3rd degree.

He died in Moscow in 1829. He was 77.

== Awards and decorations ==
- Order of St. George, 4th class (27 March 1795)
- Order of St. George, 3rd class (7 September 1812)

== See also ==
- Nikolay Vuich
- Peter Ivanovich Ivelich
- Andrei Miloradovich
- Avram Ratkov
- Ivan Adamovich
- Ilya Duka
- Georgi Emmanuel
- Mikhail Miloradovich
- Semyon Zorich
- Peter Tekeli
- Ivan Lukačević (soldier)
- Jovan Šević
- Jovan Albanez
- Simeon Piščević
- Dejan Subotić
- Fedor Yakovlevich Mirkovich
- Anto Gvozdenović
- Jovan Horvat
- Marko Ivelich
