= Serbian nobility =

Privileged class in Serbia

Serbian nobility (Serbian: српска властела / srpska vlastela, српско властелинство / srpsko vlastelinstvo or српско племство / srpsko plemstvo) refers to the historical privileged order or class (aristocracy) of Serbia, that is, the medieval Serbian states, and after the Ottoman conquests of Serbian lands in the 15th and 16th centuries, Serbian noble families of the Kingdom of Hungary, Republic of Venice, and the Habsburg monarchy. Some Serbian families were also ennobled in Russian Empire. With the independence of Serbia in the 19th century, a new aristocracy (which however differs from the notion of nobility) arose.

== Middle Ages ==
In the medieval Serbian states, the privileged class consisted of nobility and clergy, distinguished from commoners, part of the feudal society. The nobility (Serbian: vlastela, vlastelinstvo or plemstvo) were roughly grouped into magnates (velikaši or velmože) and the lesser nobility (vlasteličići). Serbia followed the Byzantine model.

== Early Modern period ==
After the Ottoman conquest in the 15th and 16th centuries, large migrations of Serbs followed into the Pannonian Plain. The community in the Kingdom of Hungary, and subsequently Habsburg Monarchy, were known as "Rascians". Serbs distinguished themselves as warriors and diplomats, and enrolled in Austrian, Transylvanian or Wallachian services. After the fall of Vienna in 1683, Serbian warriors left for Austria and Russia where they obtained high ranks and honors in the armies, and once again a new level of nobility emerged. Similarly, towards the Adriatic, the Frontier Serbs, outlaw hajduks (highwaymen, sometimes mercenaries) and Uskoks waged war against the Ottomans, and were bestowed noble titles by the Republic of Venice.

== Serbian Revolution ==
Karadjorde, the Supreme Leader of the First Serbian Uprising, granted titles of nobility during war. Amongst them were duke, prince, and military governing titles, such as voivode.

== Serbs of the Imperial Russian Nobility ==
Other Serbs who were ennobled in Russia include the generals Count Marko Konstantinovich Ivelić, Count Peter Ivanovich Ivelich, Count Georgi Arsenyevich Emmanuel, and Count Mikhail Andreyevich Miloradovich. Count Semyon Zorich also served the Russian Empire, as a lieutenant-general, but he was a Count of the Holy Roman Empire rather than a Count of the Imperial Russian Nobility.
