= Ivan Lukačević (soldier) =

Russian Imperial captain

Ivan Lukačević (Serbian: Иван Лукачевић, Russian: Иван Лукачевич; fl. 1711–12), known as Podgoričanin (Подгоричанин), was a Russian Imperial captain of Serb origin from Podgorica (now in Montenegro) that participated in planning of a Balkan Orthodox uprising with Russian aid against the Ottoman Empire. He was sent with Russian colonel of Serb origin, Mikhail Miloradovich (presumably the grandfather of Mikhail Miloradovich), to deliver documents issued by emperor Peter the Great (and written by diplomat Sava Vladislavich, another Serb in Russian service) on 3 March 1711 that called the Balkan Orthodox to rise up against the Ottomans during the Pruth River Campaign. Miloradović and Lukačević arrived at Cetinje and delivered them to metropolitan Danilo, who had them read at a Montenegrin church assembly. This was the first Russian delegation to Montenegro. Danilo, Miloradović and Lukačević then organized military operations (such as the attack on Nikšić). In September 1712, Lukačević left Montenegro and headed for Russia. However, he was left in Berlin.

== See also ==
- Andrei Miloradovich
- Nikolay Depreradovich
- Ivan Adamovich
- Ilya Mikhailovich Duka
- Avram Ratkov
- Nikolay Bogdanov
- Matija Zmajević
- Semyon Zorich
- Peter Tekeli
- Georgi Emmanuel
- Simeon Piščević
- Jovan Albanez
- Jovan Šević
- Anto Gvozdenović
- Fedor Yakovlevich Mirkovich
- Marko Ivelich

== Sources ==
- Institut za istoriju Sarajevo (1981). Prilozi. Vol. 18. Institut za istoriju Sarajevo. pp. 228–.
- Istorijski institut SR Crne Gore (1951). Istorijski zapisi. Vol. 4–5. Istorijski institut SR Crne Gore.
- Đorđević, Vladan (1912). Evropa i Crna Gora: Crna Gora između Turske, Rusije i Mletaka u XVIII veku. Sv. Sava.
- Popović, Nikola B. (1994). Srbija i carska Rusija. Službeni list SRJ. ISBN 9788635501963.
- Лещиловская, И. И. (2006). Сербский народ и Россия в XVIII веке. Алетейя. pp. 43, 49. ISBN 978-5-89329-792-8.
