= Jovan Horvat =

Russian general of Serbian origin (1713–1786)

Ivan Horvat
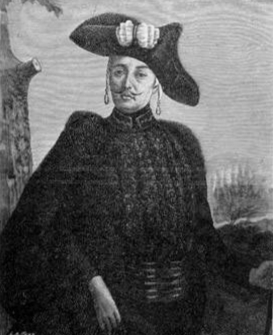
- Jovan Horvat
- Born: 1713; Petrovaradin, Hungary
- Died: 18 November 1786 (aged 72–73) Vologda, Russian Empire
- Allegiance: Russian Empire
- Service years: 1751–1759
- Children: 1 son

Jovan Samuilović Horvat de Kurtič, also referred to as Ivan Horvat (Serbian Cyrillic: Јован Самуиловић Хорват de Куртич, also referred to as Иван Хорват; also known as Jovan Horvat (Serbian Cyrillic: Јован Хорват), Ivan Khorvat (Russian: Иван Хорват), Ivan Samoylovich Khorvat (Russian: Иван Самойлович Хорват), and Ivan Samuilovich Khorvat (Russian: Иван Самуилович Хорват); 1713 — 18 November 1786) was a Russian general of Serbian origin who founded New Serbia in the modern Kirovohrad Oblast.

== Biography ==
Jovan Horvat's ancestors were originally from the town of Arvati, Macedonia, where his ancestors had an estate from the times of the Serbian Nemanjić dynasty. In the 1670s, his grandfather Marko Horvat settled in the Habsburg Military Frontier. He took his last name after his native village. Marko distinguished himself in the Austrian military fighting ancestral enemies and earned a patent of nobility and a coat of arms from Emperor Leopold I. His son Samuil Horvat became a landowner in a village named after their estate Curtici, in Arad county.

In 1726, Samuil received a Nobiliary particle de Kurtič (Serbian: от Куртич / ot Kurtič) from Charles VI after serving as governor of Waradin (now Oradea, Romania). Later, Samuil's son Jovan, born in Petrovaradin in 1722, would carry the nobiliary particle proudly as he advanced through military ranks in an Austrian infantry regiment and later in Russia where his title was also recognized.

In 1751, Jovan Samuilović Horvat de Kurtič, his brother Dimitrije, and Nikola and Teodor Chorba contacted Mikhail Petrovich Bestuzhev-Ryumin, the Russian Ambassador to Austria, and requested his permission to migrate to Russia. Bestuzhev-Ryumin accepted their request on the condition that it be approved by the Russian Government. The Government not only approved their immigration but offered them and their families citizenship and employment in the Russian military. In fact, all the families of the officers who served in the Austrian military were granted citizenship and all officers were given jobs in the Russian army. While waiting for a response from St. Petersburg, Jovan Horvat, along with 281 other military officers and subalterns submitted their resignation request to the Hofkriegsrat, the Aulic War Council of Austria, so that they could be released from the Austrian military and transfer into Russian service. Their resignations were immediately forwarded to Maria Theresa, the Austrian Empress who at the time was on friendly terms with the Russian Empress, had no problem discharging and freeing them from their obligations.

On the 13th of July 1751, Ambassador Bestuzhev-Ryumin received confirmation from Empress Elizabeth of Russia that Horvat and the other officers were given permission to leave for Russia and that jobs would be made available for them in the Russian military. Horvat eventually would be promoted to General and the other officers who showed equal élan achieved high ranks in the Russian military as well. Bestuzhev-Ryumin, his secretary Chemyev, Horvat and brothers Nikola, Todor and Jovan Chorba, Jovan Šević, and Rajko Depreradović set out to organize the migration in three groups.

Led by Jovan Horvat, a convoy of officers and their families and others left Austria and arrived in Imperial Russia at the end of September 1751.

Most of the settlements were named after the ones in their homeland. With the Empress's consent, Jovan Horvat built the foundation of the Fort of St. Elizabeth (named in honor of her Saint patroness, now located in today's Kropyvnytskyi, an administrative center of the Kirovohrad Oblast). The fort would play an important role in Russia's victory over the Ottoman Empire. After the Russo-Turkish War, Lieutenant General Peter Tekeli who was the commander of all armed forces stationed in Novorossiya (formerly New Serbia and Slavo-Serbia), used the Fort of St. Elizabeth to disband the Zaporozhian Cossacks and destroy their base, the Zaporozhian Sich in 1775.

In the New Serbian corpus founded in 1759 that united the regiments under his command, Horvat saw the possibility for the formation of the Serbian national core on the territory of the Russian Empire. He formed and was the head of the executive power with departments for military affairs, foreign affairs, economy, and finances, though he made many enemies along the way, namely Simeon Piščević as attested by his memoir.

The Supreme Court, which he initiated and founded, was the same court that sentenced him in exile for alleged abuse of power and corruption. Thus by decree of Catherine the Great, he was dismissed in 1762 and expelled to Vologda, at the time an insignificant town of Archangelgorod Governorate. He was eventually pardoned by Empress Catherine and allowed to return only after Peter Tekeli's intervention in 1775. Jovan Horvat died in 1780 in Vologda, at the age of 64.

== See also ==
- Dmitry Horvat
- Rajko Depreradović
- Jovan Šević
- Jovan Albanez
- Ivan Adamovich
- Ilya Duka
- Nikolay Depreradovich
- Simeon Končarević
- Pavle Julinac
- Simeon Piščević
- Mikhail Miloradovich
- Semyon Zorich
- Peter Tekeli
- Georgi Emmanuel
- Marko Ivelich
- Peter Ivanovich Ivelich
- Andrei Miloradovich

== Sources ==
- "Хорват-Куртиц, Иван" . Brockhaus and Efron Encyclopedic Dictionary (in Russian). 1906.
