= Macedonian Hussar Regiment =

Military unit in the Russian Imperial Army

- Active: 1759–1783
- Country: (Russian Empire) Imperial Russian Army
- Branch: Cavalry
- Type: Hussars (Light Cavalry)
- Size: Regiment
- Garrison/HQ: New Russia
- Colors: Straw-yellow pelisse and dolman, red cuffs, black cords

The Macedonian Hussar Regiment was a military unit involved in the Russian Imperial Army. The establishment of the Macedonian Hussar Regiment occurred on 10 May 1759. The Hussars were active in defense of Russia's southern borders, which had become volatile due to new migration and the aftereffects of the War of the Austrian Succession. Over the following decades, the regiment was disbanded and reformed frequently, before disbanding permanently in 1783.

== History ==
In the middle of the 18th century started a migration from the Military Frontier of the Habsburg monarchy to the Russian Empire. Russian authorities gave these new settlers a land, which acquired names as New Serbia and Slavo-Serbia, soon after the War of the Austrian Succession. The purpose of these polities was protection of southern borders of the Russian empire as well as participation in Russian military operations near that region.

In 1750, the Russian ambassador in Vienna, Mikhail Petrovich Bestuzhev-Ryumin, informed the Empress Elizaveta that Orthodox peoples such as Serbs, Macedonians, Bulgarians and Vlachs expressed willingness to serve Empress Elizabeth "with blood and arms", and he recommended forming military units composed of Serbs, Macedonians and Bulgarians, who were "renowned for their bravery". The first point of contact between the South Slavic population and Bestuzhev-Ryumin was Colonel of the Military Frontier militia Jovan Horvat. In 1751, commander Horvat, requested and received permission from Empress Elizabeth to leave the Austrian army and resettle in Russia. In his project submitted to the Empress and the Russian Senate, Horvat described the nations involved as Serbs, Macedonians, Bulgarians, and Vlachs. The Senate adopted this definition, and subsequent decrees specified that only settlers “of the Serbian, Macedonian, Bulgarian, and Wallachian nations” could establish colonies in the Don region. Horvat himself distinguished himself as a major and later lieutenant colonel before organizing the first mass migration of Orthodox Slavs into Russia. In 1753, Austrian officers of Serbian origin Jovan Šević and Rajko Preradović were granted the rank of major general and authorized to settle “all Serbian, Macedonian, and other Orthodox peoples” east of Horvat’s regiment and the Dnieper River, between Bakhmut and Luhansk, and to form two hussar regiments of 1,000 men each. This marked the beginning of the largest migration of Orthodox populations from the Balkans to Russia, supported by subsidies from the Russian Senate. The foreign settlement of New Serbia began with the creation of 40 military companies by August 1753, though the 20 companies of the Hussar Cavalry Regiment settled much faster than those of the Pandur Infantry Regiment. Many of the refugees who formed the Macedonian Regiment were described by the imperial authorities as Bulgarians, with Vlachs, Serbs and Greeks also among the participants. In Jovan Horvat’s report to the Russian Senate (1 December 1754) on the national composition of military and newly arrived settlers across the regiments of New Serbia totaled 5,680 people, comprising 4,548 Polish, Muntenian (Vlach), and Arnaut (Albanian) individuals, 663 Serbs, 289 Macedonians, 119 Bulgarians, and 61 Catholic or Lutheran converts from the Holy Roman Empire (Germans and Hungarians). On 9 March 1759, Horvat, with the permission of Empress Elizaveta Petrovna, formed the Macedonian Hussar Regiment. New Serbia and Slavo-Serbia in fact were populated by a different nationalities and the names of the regiments formed there did not reflect exactly their national composition. The commander of the Macedonian Hussar Regiment was Aleksey Kostyurin.

The coat of arms of the Macedonian Hussar Regiment was approved in 1776 and represented: "A silver shield in a red field, with different decorations, and under it two crossed wooden arrows covered with gold dots." On 26 July 1761, the Macedonian Hussars were merged with the existing Bulgarian Hussar Regiment into a general Macedonian Hussars Regiment because of the small number of personnel in both the regiments. On 10 May 1763, by decree of Empress Catherine II, the Macedonian Hussar Regiment was disbanded and its personnel were assigned to the Polish, Moldovan and Serbian Hussar Regiments. On 24 December 1776, a new Macedonian Hussar Regiment consisting of 6 squadrons was created from the 9 foreign regiments established on the territory of Azov and Novorossiysk regions to protect the southern borders of the empire. On 28 June 1783, it was disbanded and his staff assigned to the Alexandrian Hussar Regiment.

=== Modern discourse ===
The designation Macedonian then was popular in Europe only in early modern cultural contexts, but was nearly forgotten in the modern-day region. Austrian and Russian Empires used it during the 17th and 18th centuries about populations coming from the Balkans and this is the case of the name of that regiment. Modern Macedonian historians consider its existence as a confirmation of an ethnic Macedonian continuity. Per Bulgarian researcher Galin Dimitrov, the claims that members of the regiment belonged to the Macedonian nation contradict the historical logic. Along with pointing the example of some participants' belonging to the Macedonian nation, the Macedonian historian Aleksandar Matkovski confirmed that it was too early for the existence of such separate national entity in the modern sense. Macedonian historian Blaže Ristovski agreed that the theories of a distinct Slavic Macedonian identity evolved outside the modern region and existed without the participation of Macedonian Slavs at least until the second half of the 19th century. Bulgarian sources also maintain that the Macedonian Hussar Regiment was not composed of ethnic Macedonians. According to the Bulgarian researcher Ivan Tyutyundzhiev, the regiment was dominated by Aromanians (Vlachs), who were then often treated as Macedonians, which is the reason for the regiment's name. Ristovski argued that the Macedonians were clearly set apart as a distinct nationality in the regiment. Apollon Skalkowski’s demographic data for the Novorossiya Governorate from 1773, published in his 1836 work, likewise listed Macedonians as a distinct group, separate from both Vlachs and Bulgarians. According to Peter von Köppen's 1861 work on immigrants in the European part of Russia, among the Macedonians there was a group of people who called themselves "Black Bulgarians (who use Vlach letters)" or Gagauz. According to Bulgarian academic Nikola Vasilev Mihov, the term "Black Bulgarians" referred to Vlachs from Macedonia. Per Brockhaus and Efron Encyclopedic Dictionary, the regiment consisted of Bulgarians and Greeks. In the book Balkan Military Settlements Strengthened the Southern Border of Russia: Mid‑18th Century, the Russian historian Elena Vladimirovna Belova agrees with this claim, also adding Vlachs to them. In the book From the past of Novorossiya: Serbs Guarding the Russian Borders (1750s–1760s), Belova argued that the regiments were formed according to national affiliation, and as a result, the Macedonian regiment was formed. According to Ukrainian-Bulgarian researcher Vladimir Milchev, the idea of creating these regiments was not a project to build national units, while it preceded the birth of nationalism in Europe, pointing at the significant number of "Montenegrins" in the Macedonian regiment. According to the historian Robert Bartlett, the names of the regiments did not accurately reflect their national composition.

== See also ==
- Karposh's rebellion
- Macedonian nationalism

== Sources ==
- Шумкоски Г. 2024. Македонский полк в российской армии в XVIII веке. DOI: 10.52575/2687-0967-2024-51-4-841-854. Международный институт суверенных наук, Македония, г. Битола. In: Scientific Journal: History and political science Vol. 51 No. 4, pp. 841-854 (in Russian). Belgorod National Research University. 2024. p. 844-849.
