= Marko Ivelich =

Russian general (1740–1825)

Count Marko Ivelich
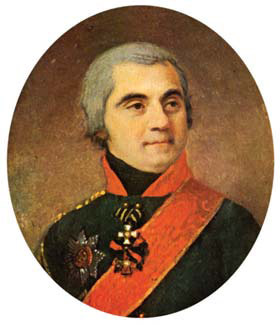
- Born: 1740; Risan, Venetian Albania
- Died: 1825 (aged 84–85)
- Military career
- Allegiance: Venice; Russia
- Branch: Army
- Rank: Lieutenant General
- Wars: Russo-Turkish War (1768–1774); Russo-Turkish War (1787–1792)
- Awards: Order of St. Vladimir; Order of St. Anna; Order of St. George

Count Marko Konstantinovich Ivelić (Note: Russian: Марк Константинович Ивелич, romanized: Mark Konstantinovich Ivelich.) (also spelled Ivelich; 1740–1825) was a Montenegrin-born Russian general who rose to prominence during the reign of Emperor Nicholas I of Russia and Prince-Bishop Petar I Petrović-Njegoš of Montenegro. He became a Russian general and count. In 1811, he was a diplomatic emissary to Revolutionary Serbia.

== Family ==
An old Risan family, the first Ivelich, according to some sources, settled in there at the time of the Nemanjić dynasty. Marko Ivelich was born in 1740. He had two brothers: Ivan, who was a major general in the Imperial Russian army, stationed at Vladikavkaz Garrison Regiment from 1805 to 1810, before he retired; and Semyon, also a high-ranking military officer. His nephew Peter Ivelich fought in the Battle of Borodino and many other battles against Napoleonic France. The Ivelich family produced four high-ranking military officers in the Imperial Russian Army.

== Military career ==
Ivelich's education and military career began in the Republic of Venice. There he received the rank of lieutenant before he moved to Imperial Russia. Ivelich joined the Russian admiral Aleksei Grigoryevich Orlov in 1770 and participated in the fight against the Turks in Boka Kotorska. He was a commander of a part of the Russian Mediterranean fleet. The Russian fleet was under the overall command of Chesmensky, an honorific surname given to Admiral Orlov by Catherine the Great after he defeated the Turkish fleet at the Battle of Chesma, not far from the island of Chios. Ivelich and over a hundred sailors from Boka Kotorska participated in that battle. When the war against the Turks began again in 1788, he was again sent to Montenegro and Herzegovina to stir up the local population; at the same time, he was assigned to form 12 battalions composed of Serbs and other Slavs and to act with them independently. Ivelich successfully completed the task assigned to him and repeatedly defeated the Turks. He became a General of the Russian army in 1800.

In 1805, for the third time sent to Montenegro to induce people to participate in the war against the French. Arriving in the Kotor region after the unsuccessful Battle of Austerlitz, when Venice and the Dalmatian coast were ceded to France by agreement, Ivelich nevertheless managed to arouse the population to resist, which contributed a lot to the success of further actions of Admiral Dmitry Senyavin's Second Archipelago Expedition. In 1812, Ivelich was sent with a diplomatic mission to Wallachia and then contributed to the conclusion of peace between the Turks and Serbs following the 1812 Treaty of Bucharest, which in turn became very unpopular among the Serbs, since it failed to achieve any of the political aims of the First Serbian uprising. He secured for the Russian troops to enter Šabac and Belgrade fortress, for which he had a falling out with Karađorđe, who also, as did Peter I of Montenegro earlier, accused him of being more a proponent of Russian interests than of his own compatriots

In 1814, Ivelich became a senator and an officeholder in the Russian-American Company. He died in 1825.

== See also ==
- Peter Ivanovich Ivelich
- Andrei Miloradovich
- Jovan Horvat
- Nikolay Depreradovich
- Ivan Adamovich
- Ilya Duka
- Ivan Lukačević (soldier)
- Jovan Tekelija
- Matija Zmajević
- Marko Ivanovich Voinovich
- Jovan Albanez
- Jovan Šević
- Simeon Piščević
- Semyon Zorich
- Georgi Emmanuel
- Anto Gvozdenović
- Mikhail Miloradovich
- Pavle Julinac
- Dmitry Horvat
- Nikolai Dimitrievich Dabić
- Nikolai Kuznetsov (admiral)

== Sources ==
- "Ивелич, Марк Константинович" . Brockhaus and Efron Encyclopedic Dictionary (in Russian). 1906.
