= Pavle Julinac =

Writer and military officer

- Born: 1730; Segedin or Čurug
- Died: 1785 (aged 54–55)
- Occupations: writer, historian, traveller, soldier and diplomat

Pavle Julinac (1730–1785) was a Serbian writer, philosopher, historian, traveler, soldier, and diplomat in the Imperial Russian service. Julinac's "A Short Introduction to the History of the Slavo-Serbian People" published in Venice in 1765 was the first historiography on Serbs. Ten years later, Julinac's translation of Marmontel's "Bélisaire" was the first West European literary work in Serbian. The work of Marmontel soon popularized the philosophical ideas of the Enlightenment in Austria among the large Slavo-Serbian population there and in Russia.

== Biography ==
It is not known for certain where Pavle Julinac was born. Some sources state that he was born in Segedin; others believe it was in Čurug. He came from a noble Serbian Military Frontier family, the son of an Austrian soldier Arsenije Julinac, and the nephew of Major Vasilije Julinac of Segedin. Julinac attended the Lyceum in Pozun (Bratislava) from 1747 to 1753. Upon graduation, Julinac spoke Serbian, Slovak, German, Hungarian, Romanian, Russian, and French. He held the greatest esteem for his teacher and mentor, Slovak historian Jovan Tomka Saksi, who taught the importance of geography as an introduction to historical treatises.

Upon retirement, Julinac's father received patent of nobility. A title and an estate too small to support his numerous family Pavle was entrusted to the care of his wealthy godfather, then Lieutenant Colonel Jovan Šević, who took Pavle after graduation with him to Russia. Pavle eventually entered the Russian military service and was assigned to the Russian embassy in Vienna as a courier.

== Slavo-Serbia and New Serbia ==
At the time, free lands in Slavo-Serbia and New Serbia were being offered to Serbs, Vlachs, and other Balkan people of Orthodox Christian denomination to ensure frontier protection and development of this part of Southern steppes. Slavo-Serbia was directly governed by Russia's Governing Senate. Pavle Julinac joined the mass of settlers leaving Austria for Russia, led by Rajko Preradović and his godfather Jovan Šević. Upon his arrival in Russia, Julinac immediately entered the Russian military service.

During the reign of Catherine the Great, Julinac was appointed to the Russian Embassy in Vienna as a courier in 1761. Working under the protection of Prince Dmitry Mikhailovich Golitsyn (1721-1793), the Russian ambassador to Vienna from 1761 to 1793, Julinac was given a mission to liaise between Russia and the disfranchised Serbs whose territories were under both the Habsburg and Ottoman rule since the 15th century. Later, he was active in recruiting Serbian Austrians and Serbian Hungarians into the Russian military service.

In 1781, Julinac was made Russian consul in Naples, while still in military service. As consul in the Port of Naples, he was charged with the duty of attending to the Russian seamen's interests there and other tasks. Eventually, ill-health would compel him to return to Austria to the Russian Embassy, and he died in Vienna on 25 February 1785.

== Works ==
He is best known for four books, each with a historical and literary significance of the time.

Among the Serbian books published in Venice during the eighteenth century, there was the first historiographical work on Serbs, written by Julinac in 1765 with the title: "A Short Introduction to the History of the Slavo-Serbian People". Julinac's books were printed in the Greco-Orthodox typography of Dimitrije Teodosije, a printer of Greek origin.

Marmontel's Belisaire was the first French novel translated into Serbian and published by Pavle Julinac in the year 1775.

Julinac also translated The Song of Roland, an epic poem based on the Battle of Roncevaux in 778, during the reign of Charlemagne who became one of the principal figures in the literary cycle as Matter of France.

He wrote his memoirs and a travel book of his visit to Hilandar Monastery at Mount Athos.

His contemporary, the famous Serbian man of letter, Dositej Obradović, called him "Major Julinac," the highest military rank he attained while in the Russian military and diplomatic service.

== See also ==
- Jovan Horvat
- Ivan Lukačević (soldier)
- Jovan Šević
- Jovan Albanez
- Simeon Piščević
- Anto Gvozdenović
- Mikhail Miloradovich
- Semyon Zorich
- Peter Tekeli
- Georgi Emmanuel
- Marko Ivelich
