= Serbian Hussar Regiment =

Serbian Hussar Regiment — III —
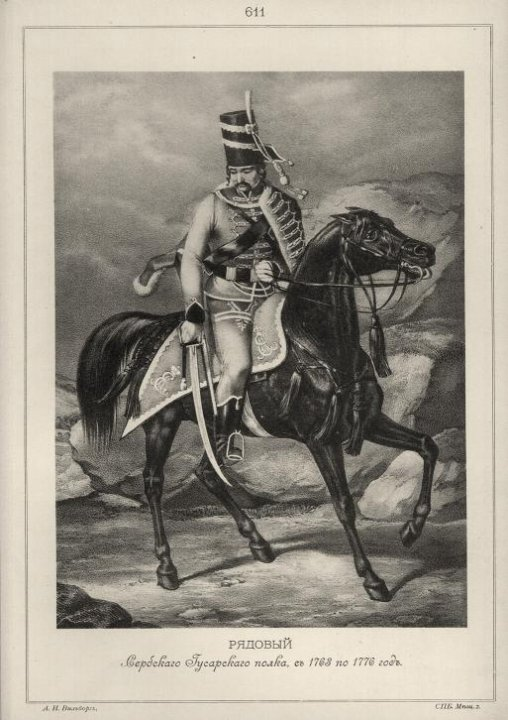
- Serbian hussar in service for the Russian Empire, the 18th century
- Active: 1723–1783
- Country: Russian Empire
- Size: 5,000 (in 1727)
- Engagements: War of the Polish Succession; Russo-Swedish War (1741-43)

Commanders
- First commander: Jovan Albanez

The Serbian Hussar Regiment was a military unit of the Russian Imperial Army that consisted primarily of Serbian colonists in Russia. This cavalry unit served from 1723 to 1783.

== Background ==
Due to Rákóczi's War of Independence (1703–1711), the position of Serbian militiamen in the Military Frontier of the Habsburg monarchy was endangered. In 1704, Serbs first attempted to offer their services to the Russian Empire in its struggle against the Ottomans. Before the Russo-Turkish War (1710–11), Russian Emperor Peter I of Russia invited Serbian militiamen, and Serbs in general, to join the Russian forces. During this period, a small group of Serbs, including Jovan Albanez, emigrated to Russia. A small Serb unit commanded by then-Captain Albanez distinguished itself in the Pruth River Campaign (1710–11), so Peter the Great decided to expand this unit and turn it into a separate Serbian Hussar Regiment.

In 1723, Peter the Great sent Albanez to the Pomorišje and Potisje regions of the Habsburg monarchy's Military Frontier to recruit additional Serbian militiamen. The invitation letter carried by Albanez was signed by Peter the Great on 23 October 1723. Every military man who emigrated to Russia with his wife and children would be granted arable land, while those who emigrated with larger numbers of people were promised additional privileges. Albanez was quite successful with recruitment. On 5 May 1724, Albanez reported from Serbia that he had recruited ten officers, including one colonel. According to some sources, 459 Serbs emigrated to Russia in 1724, and 600 in 1725. A detailed list of the military unit Albanez commanded was made in 1726.

== Establishment and command staff ==
In 1724, a military unit known as the Serb Command (Serbian: Српска команда), consisting of Serbian colonists, was established and put under the command of the Kiev garrison. Between 1724 and 1729, the Serbian Hussar Regiment was expanded and completed its organisational structure. In 1727 this military unit had 459 Serb hussars when it was established as a separate regiment, Serb Hussar Regiment, by the decision of Empress Anna. It was also known as the Old Serbian Hussar Regiment. Its first commander was Major Jovan Albanez; members of the command staff included Captain Jovan Stojanov, Captain Georgije Marjanović, Captain Teodor Petrov, and Lieutenant Stefan Vitković (later promoted to brigadier).

The large-scale recruitment of Serbs from Austria was opposed by Austria, and only smaller groups of Serbs continued to emigrate to Russia and enlist to serve in this regiment. To reach the regiment's planned strength, several hundred Ukrainian Cossacks were transferred to it. The Serbian Hussar Regiment served as a role model for the establishment of three additional regiments (Hungarian, Georgian, and Moldavian) in the 1740s and two more (Bulgarian and Macedonian) during the Seven Years' War.

== Military engagements ==
Until 1734, the regiment had no permanent garrison, although it was established primarily to secure the Ukrainian front line. Between 1729 and 1731, the regiment served with the Russian infantry corps in the southern provinces of Persia. In 1732, the regiment returned from Persia and, from 1733 to 1734, participated in the War of the Polish Succession. When the regiment participated in the Russo-Swedish War (1741–1743), it numbered between 500 and 800 soldiers.

== See also ==
- Jovan Albanez
- Jovan Šević
