= Ilya Duka =

Russian general in the Napoleonic Wars

Baron Ilya Mikhailovich Duka
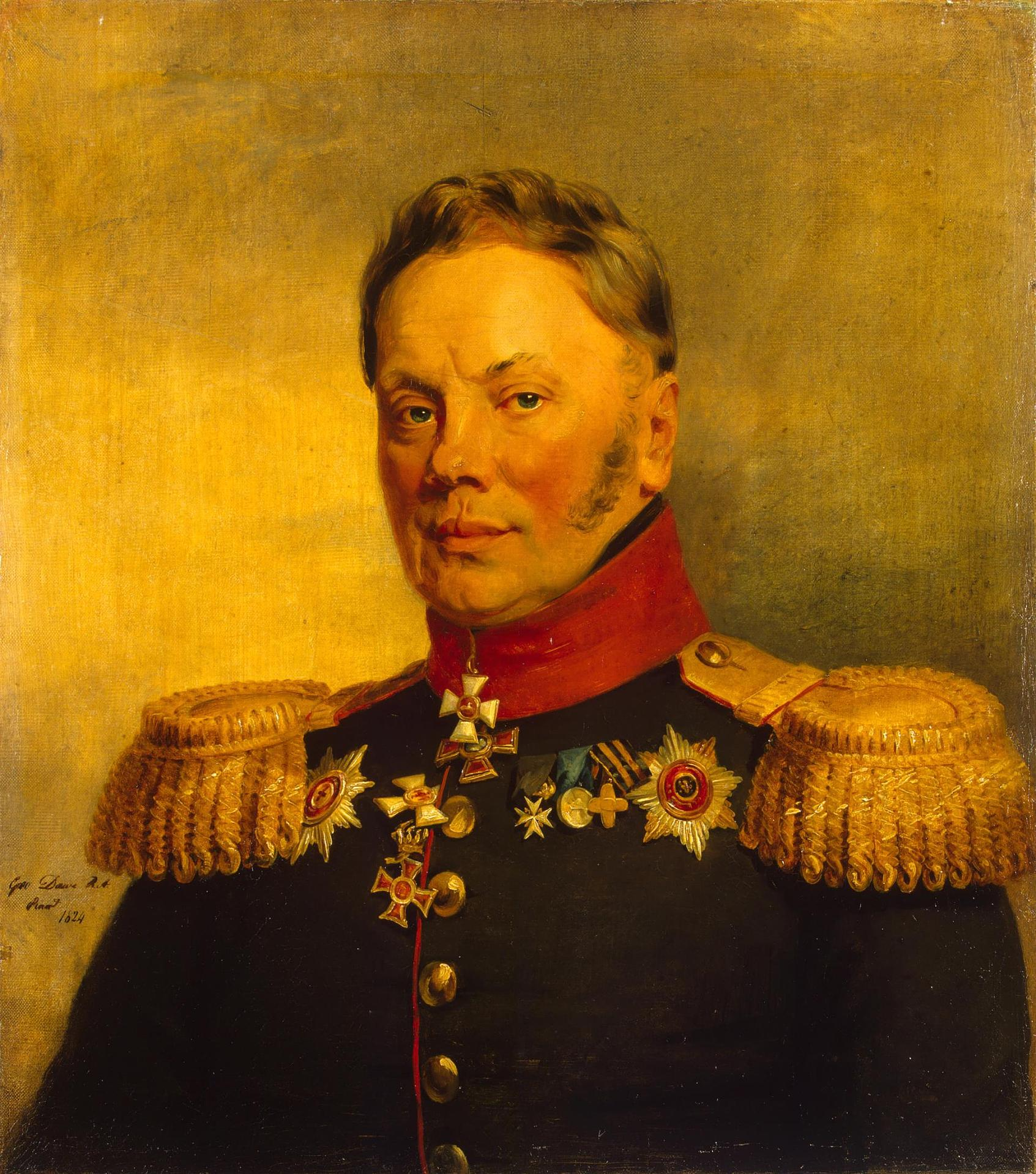
- Portrait by George Dawe in the Military Gallery of the Winter Palace
- Born: 1768; Aachen, Holy Roman Empire
- Died: February 28, 1830; Ivnya, Kursk Governorate, Imperial Russia
- Military career
- Allegiance: Russian Empire
- Branch: Army
- Service years: 1776–1827
- Rank: General of the Cavalry
- Wars: Russo-Turkish War (1787–1792); Kościuszko Uprising; War of the Fourth Coalition; Battle of Eylau; Patriotic War of 1812; Battle of Borodino; Battle of Tarutino; Battle of Maloyaroslavets; War of the Sixth Coalition; Battle of Leipzig; Capture of Paris
- Awards: Order of St. George; Order of the Red Eagle; Order of Leopold; Order of St. Vladimir; Gold Sword for Bravery; Order of Saint Anna

Ilya Mikhailovich Duka (Russian: Илья Михайлович Дука; 1768–28 February 1830) was a Russian general in the Napoleonic Wars and Imperial baron.

== Early life ==
Duka was born in Aachen in 1768. He was described himself as being "of the Serb nation" (Сербской нации). In 1774, with the death of his father, he moved to Russia, the birthplace of his mother, and lived with relatives. In 1776 he joined the Russian army with a lower officer rank.

== Military service ==
In 1776, he served as fourrier at the Nasheburgskiy infantry regiment (polk). In 1780 he commanded a light cavalry regiment in Ukraine, with the rank of vakhmistr. He was elevated to the commissioned officer rank of poruchik (lieutenant).

His first military engagement came in 1788 with the Russo-Turkish campaign, in Kuban. In 1790 he served with the Ostrogozh light cavalry regiment. In 1792 and in 1794 he fought against Polish forces. In the 1794 campaign, he fought at Krupczyce, Brest-Litovsk and Praga. He distinguished himself by capturing General Tomasz Wawrzecki and his officers, and was promoted to major. In 1799, while commanding a Hussar regiment, he was promoted to polkovnik (colonel) and transferred to command the Life Guard Hussar Regiment.

For distinction at Austerlitz (1805), he was decorated with the Order of Saint Vladimir 4th Class. In October 1806, Duka was appointed shef ("chief") of the Little Russia (Malorossiyski) Cuirassier Regiment. With the Malorossiyski Regiment he fought against the Napoleonic forces at Golymin, at Eylau, at Allenstein (February 1807), Yankov. For distinction at Eylau, he was awarded the Order of St. George 3rd Class. In May 1807 he was promoted to general-major. He was also awarded the Golden Weapon "For Bravery".

In 1812, Duka commanded the 2nd Brigade of the 2nd Cuirassier Division, and later commanded the division itself. For his actions at Smolensk and Borodino Duka was awarded the Order of St. Anna (1st Class) and for the battles of Tarutino and Maloyaroslavets—the Order of St. Vladimir (2nd Class); he participated also in the Battle of Krasnoi. In 1813, Duka was promoted to lieutenant general (27 September), fought at Leipzig and was wounded in the head. In 1814 he participated in the capture of Paris. He was awarded the Prussian Order of the Red Eagle and the Austrian Order of St. Leopold.

Upon his return to Russia, Duka commanded the 2nd Cuirassier Division and in September 1823, he was appointed to command the 2nd Reserve Cavalry Corps. In September 1826, he was promoted to the general of cavalry, the next highest rank to Field marshal, and then retired on 17 February 1827 because of ill health. He died on 28 February 1830.

== See also ==
- Peter Ivanovich Ivelich
- Ivan Shevich
- Andrei Miloradovich
- Avram Ratkov
- Ivan Adamovich
- Nikolay Bogdanov
- Nikolay Depreradovich
- Ivan Lukačević (soldier)
- Jovan Šević
- Jovan Albanez
- Simeon Piščević
- Anto Gvozdenović
- Mikhail Miloradovich
- Semyon Zorich
- Peter Tekeli
- Georgi Emmanuel
- Fedor Yakovlevich Mirkovich
- Marko Ivelich
- Rajko Depreradović

== Annotations ==
1. In Russian, his name is spelt Iliya Mikhailovich Duka (Илья Михайлович Дука).

== Sources ==
- Безотосный, Виктор (2021). Российский генералитет эпохи 1812 года. Опыт изучения коллективной биографии. Litres. ISBN 978-5-04-344412-7.
- Шишов, А. В (2013-12-14). 100 великих героев 1812 года. Издательство "Вече". ISBN 978-5-4444-7251-4.
