= Ivan Ivelich =

Ivan Konstantinovich Ivelich (c. 1745 – after 1810) was a major general in Imperial Russian service, originating from Boka Kotorska region (now Montenegro). He was a member of the Ivelich family, and the youngest brother of Marko Ivelich and Semen Konstantinovich Ivelich. Peter Ivelich was his nephew.

== Biography ==
Born in Risan, he came from the noble Ivelich family who trace their Serbian roots back to the 14th century. In 1777 he left the Republic of Venice and entered the Russian military service. He participated in the second Russo-Turkish War.

On 1 December 1799 he was promoted to colonel and commanded the 19th Jaeger Regiment from 12 December 1799 to 20 March 1800 when he took over the 18th Jaeger Regiment until 21 June 1800. He was promoted to a major general on 3 August 1800 (or 22 July 1800 Old Calendar) and served as chef of the 6th Jaeger Regiment between 21 June 1800 and 2 July 1804 and then as chef of the Vladikavkaz Garrison Regiment between 16 January 1805 and 28 February 1810. By then, he transferred powers to major general Ivan Petrovich Del Pozzo and retired "to heal wounds."
