= Nikolai Dabić =

Russian vice-admiral (1857–1908)

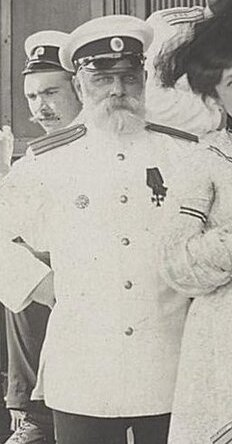
- Dabić aboard the Gromboi, 1903
- Native name: Николая Дабич
- Born: 23 April 1857; Kherson, Russian Empire
- Died: 1908
- Allegiance: Russia
- Branch: Imperial Russian Navy
- Service years: 1869–1908
- Rank: Vice-admiral
- Conflicts: Russo-Japanese War

Nikolai Dimitrievich Dabić (also spelled Dabitch or Dabich; Russian: Николай Дмитриевич Дабич; 23 April 1857 – 1908) was a Russian vice-admiral. He was a highly accomplished commander of the Imperial Russian Navy, decorated numerous times for valor in the Russo-Japanese War. He was of Serbian origin.

== Naval career ==
The Dabić family had several officers in the Russian military, the most prominent among them being Vice-Admiral Nikolai Dimitrievich Dabić. Nikolai's great grandfather was sergeant major Zaharije Dabić, who in February 1754 is mentioned as living in the newly-established Russian province of Slavo-Serbia under commanders Rajko Depreradović and Jovan Šević.

Nikolai Dimitrievich Dabić was born in Kherson on 23 April 1857. His brother was Aleksandar Dimitrievich Dabić (1855–1880), a lieutenant in the navy. Dabić entered the Imperial Russian Navy at the age of 12. He was educated at the prestigious N. G. Kuznetsov Naval Academy in Saint Petersburg, and in 1877 was promoted to michman. He became a senior lieutenant on 17 January 1882. In January 1891 he was in command of Zorka. He was promoted to captain 2nd rank on 28 March 1893. He was in command of the Russian monitor Admiral Spiridov, from 6 December 1895 and on, cruisers Afrika, from 6 December 1898 and on, Yaroslav 2 (ex-Evropa), from 13 September 1900 and on, and Gromoboi, from 1902 to 1906 in the Far East service. He was promoted to captain 1st rank on 17 April 1901.

He participated in the Russo-Japanese War as commander of the ironclad Russian cruiser Gromoboi ("Thunderer"). In a battle with the Japanese on 1 August 1904, he was seriously wounded and received an award for bravery. Because of the courage exhibited in battle by everyone aboard, the greatest praise of all belonged to Captain Dabić of the Gromoboi, who set an example while wounded under fierce barrage shelling by the superior Japanese force. He was again awarded medals of valor. Dabić was promoted to flag rank as rear-admiral on 5 March 1907. He was promoted to the rank of vice-admiral on 20 October 1908. He was then placed on the Retired List at his own request, owing to wounds sustained in the Russo-Japanese War.

Dabić died in 1908.

== Awards ==
- Order of Saint George IV degree (awarded on 27 September 1904),
- Order of St. Vladimir III and IV,
- Order of St. Anna II and III degree,
- Order of St. Stanislav II and III level.
- Prussian Order of the Red Eagle III level

== See also ==
- Matija Zmajević
- Marko Voinovich
- Marko Ivelich
- Nilolai Kuznetsov

== Notes ==
- Translated and adapted the Dabich biography from the Russian website.
- Photograph of Nikolai Dimitrievich Dabić.
