= Preradović =

Origin
- Language: Serbo-Croatian

Preradović (Serbian Cyrillic: Прерадовић) is a Serbian surname, derived from Prerad. The surname is traditionally widespread in territories of the historical Military Frontier. At least 100 individuals with the surname died at the Jasenovac concentration camp. It may refer to:

- Petar Preradović (1818–1872), Austro-Hungarian general
- Paula von Preradović (1887–1951), Austrian poet
- Rajko Depreradović (c. 1700 – after 1764) was a Serbian leader of colonists who settled the Donbas region in 1752. He is the father of Nikolay and Leontii.
- Nikolay Depreradovich (1767–1843) one of the most decorated Russian Generals who fought against Napoleonic France.
- Leontii Depreradovich (1766-1844) also fought against Napoleonic France with distinction.

== Families ==
The Preradović hail from Old Serbia, from where they settled the Kingdom of Hungary. Jovan Preradović from Bačka received Hungarian noble status in 1626. The nobility status was confirmed in 1667 for Jovan's son, Ivan. A Preradović family moved from Počitelj in Lika to Donja Krajina (modern Bjelovar-Križevci County) in 1750. Lieutenant Rajko Preradović from Bačka brought Serbs from Potisje to Russia in 1751. The Preradović family was one of several families that had settled New Serbia and Slavo-Serbia. The Preradović family in Hungary were kin to the Preradović family in the Military Frontier. The Preradović family in the Tisa Military Frontier received nobility status in 1704. General and poet Petar Preradović belonged to this family.

== See also ==
- Preradović Square, Zagreb
