= Jovan Šević =

Serbian military officer (died c. 1764)

- Јован Шевић
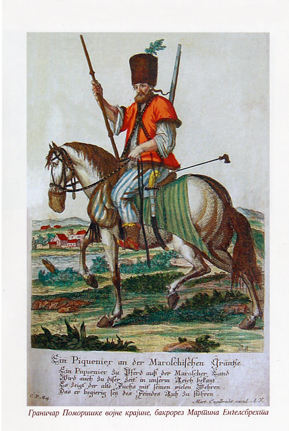
- Frontier man from Pomorišje, first half of the 18th century
- Born: unknown Military Frontier of the Habsburg monarchy
- Died: c. 1764; Slavo-Serbia, Russian Empire (modern day Ukraine)
- Military career
- Allegiance: Habsburg monarchy Russian Empire
- Rank: General
- Commands: (Habsburg monarchy) Serbian Militia in Čanad (modern-day Magyarcsanád) (–1750) (Russian Empire) Serb Hussar Regiment in Slavo-Serbia (1753–1764)

Jovan Šević or Ivan Šević (Serbian Cyrillic: Јован Шевић, Russian: Иван Егорович Шевич; died c. 1764) was an 18th-century military officer of Serb origin. He reached the rank of lieutenant colonel in the Serb militia forces in the Pomorišje region, then in the Military Frontier of the Habsburg monarchy. When it became obvious that privileges granted to Serb militiamen would be reduced or completely revoked after Pomorišje and Potisje lost their frontier status, Šević left Habsburg military service in 1750 and moved to Russia. At the end of 1752, he led the second wave of colonists who migrated from Pomorišje, Potisje and Slavonia to the Russian Empire (modern-day Ukraine) where they settled the newly established administrative region of Slavo-Serbia at the beginning of 1753. To enable him to recruit more of his fellow officers, Šević was promoted to the rank of General by the Russian Empress, Elizabeth. He commanded a Serb Hussar Regiment consisting of the colonists he brought to Russia. After Šević's death, Slavo-Serbia was disestablished, and many of his descendants became notable military officers in the Russian Imperial Army. Over time, all the Serb colonists became assimilated. Miloš Crnjanski described the migration led by Šević in his most notable work, the novel Migrations (Serbian: Сеобе).

== Family ==
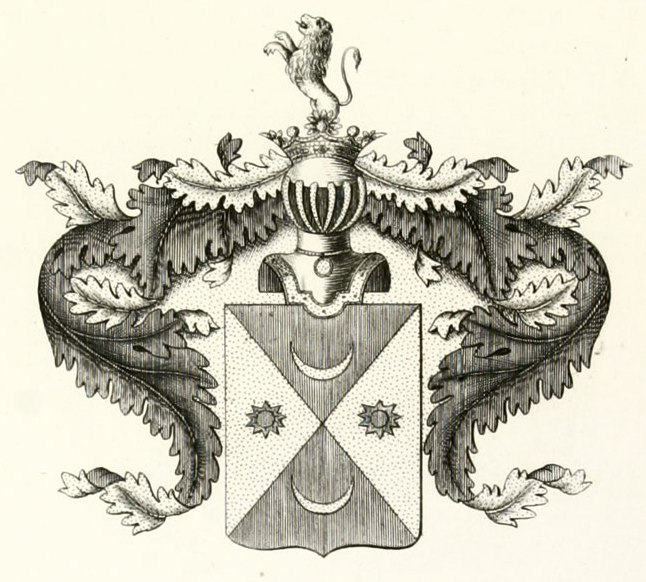
Šević family coat of arms

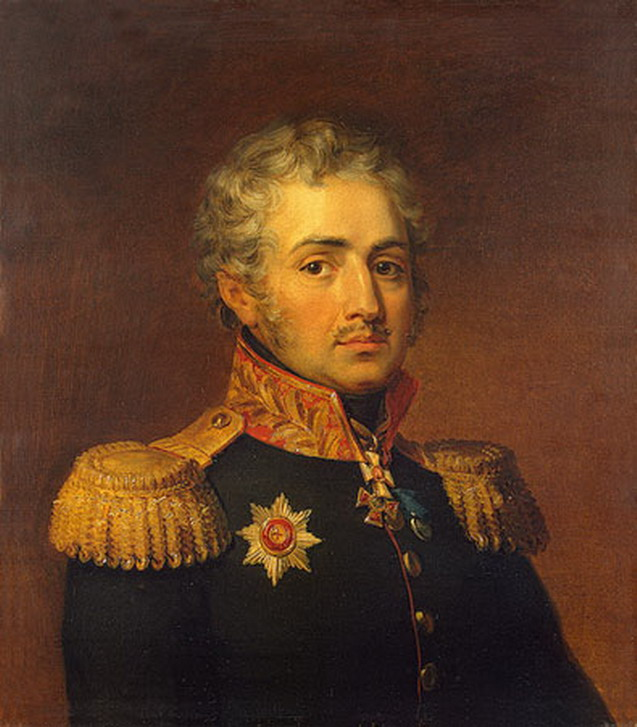
Russian General Ivan Shevich, grandson of Jovan Šević

Jovan Šević was born into a Serbian noble family that had migrated from Ottoman-occupied Serbia to the territory of the Serbian Despotate in Hungary in the first half of the 16th century. In some accounts, he is referred to as Ivan or Živan. Šević's grandfather was named Radoslav. Šević's father was Georgije, better known as Đurka Šević, who was an oberkapitän (upper captain) in the Serb militia in the Pomorišje military frontier (near Arad). Đurka succeeded Jovan Tekelija in this position in the first half of 18th century, while at that time, his son was an oberkapitän in Čanad (modern-day Magyarcsanád).

By the end of the 18th and the beginning of the 19th century, many of Šević's descendants had become successful officers in the Imperial Russian Army. Šević had a son named Petar, who was a lieutenant in the Moriš Brigade before the migration to Russia, where he reached the rank of lieutenant colonel. Another one of Šević's sons, Ivan, was a colonel, and his son Georgije later reached the rank of General in the Imperial Russian Army. Georgije's son, Ivan (Šević's great-grandson) also became a Russian General. In 1812, he was decorated for bravery at the Battle of Borodino, during Napoleon's invasion of Russia. Šević's daughter was married to Stevan Petrović (formerly Šarović), who had moved from Podgorica to Slavo-Serbia.

== Pomorišje Military Frontier ==
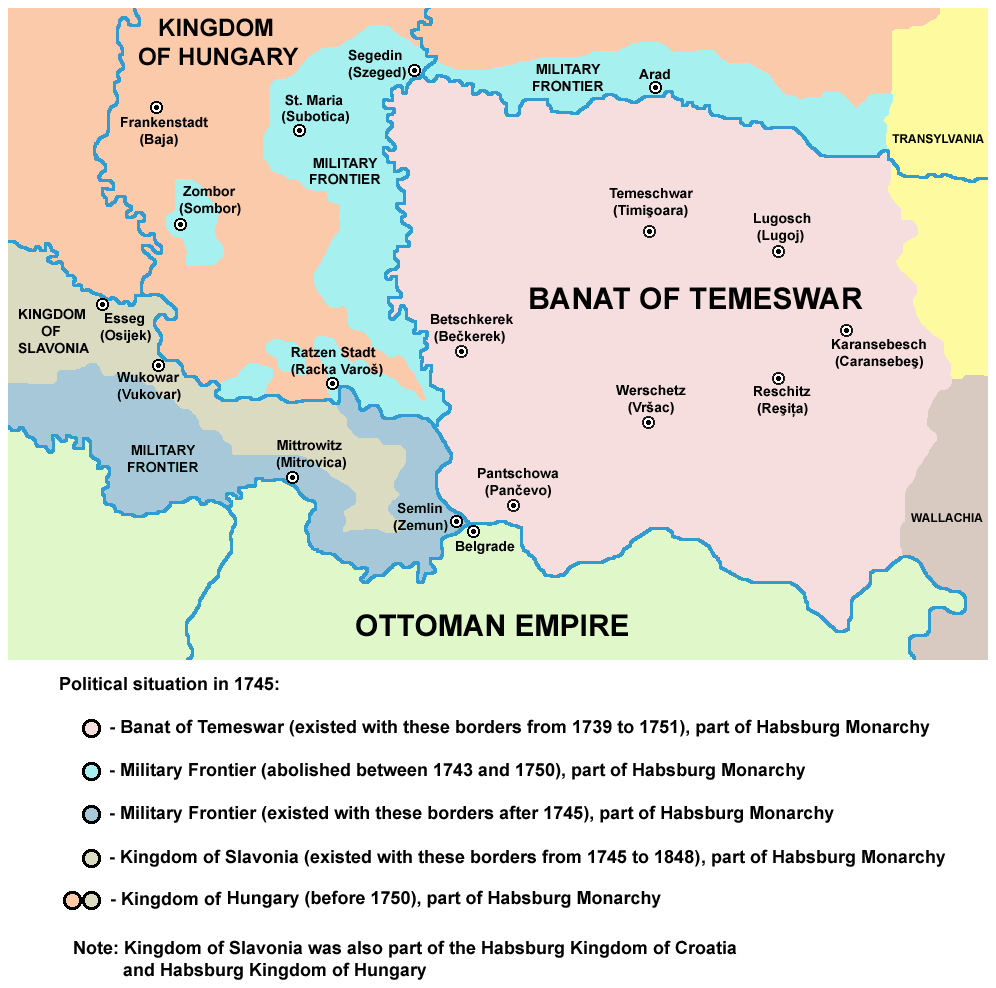
Military Frontier in Pomorišje and Potisje in 1745

Šević was firmly opposed to the plans to disestablish the Military Frontier in Pomorišje. When it was obvious that Pomorišje and Potisje would lose their frontier status, Šević decided to migrate to Russia. In the November 1750 plebiscite, he was the first higher-ranking officer who left the Habsburg army; he applied to be regular citizen and requested a passport to emigrate to Russia. To avoid issuing the passport to Šević, the government officials staged a trial against him and arrested him, but eventually lost the case because of the lack of evidence for their accusations. When Šević was in prison, the prosecution canvassed his rival, ambitious Jovan Horvat, who additionally accused Šević to support their case. When the prosecution lost their case because of the lack of evidence, Horvat left their side and became one of the most ardent supporters of migration to Russia. On 19 October 1751, Šević's passport was issued, but he did not travel to Russia immediately after he received it. He gradually sold his property and secretly tried to convince other military officers to join him and migrate to Russia.

To prevent emigration of a larger number of Serbs to Russia, Habsburg Empress Maria Theresa issued a special decree (German: Pönal-Patent) on 19 June 1752. People who would try to convince citizens of the Habsburg monarchy to move to another country and serve another empire would be executed. The Russian empress Elizabeth promoted Šević to the rank of General with the right to appoint other subordinated military officers who would join him to migrate to Russia. In September 1752, about a year after he received his passport, Šević led the second group of Serb colonists to Russian Empire.

== Slavo-Serbia ==
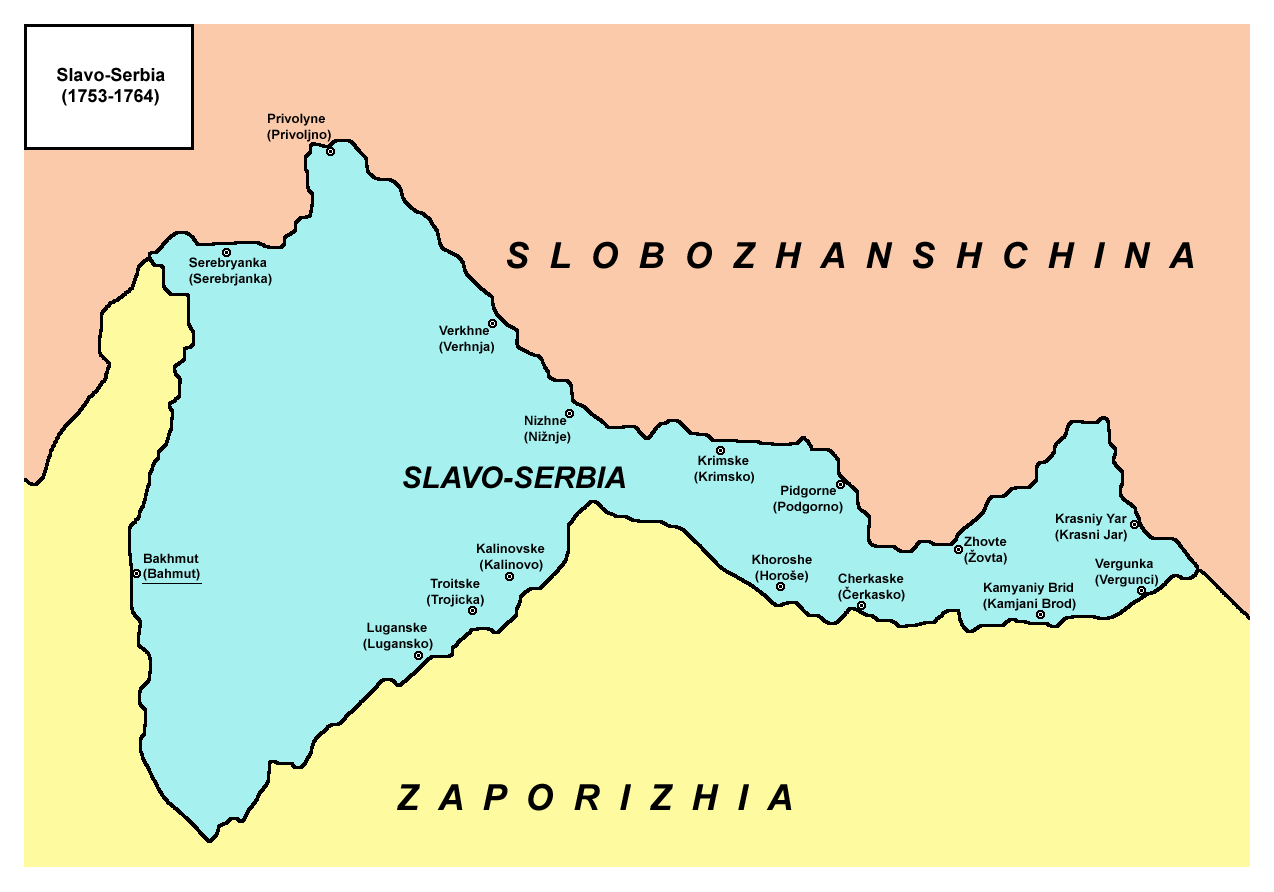
Map of Slavo-Serbia

Šević was among the Serbian military officers who led about 3,000 Serb families that emigrated to the region along river Donets. The group led by Šević was the second group of Serb emigrants to the Russian Empire. The first group settled the region which was referred to as New Serbia for some time. The second group, led by Šević, settled the territory which they named Slavo-Serbia. This name was initially proposed by Šević. They left Pomorišje in September 1752 and reached Kiev in December 1752. There, they were instructed to settle New Serbia governed by Jovan Horvat. They refused to do so and Šević accompanied by Rajko Preradović, a Colonel of the Slavonian Hussar Regiment, went to St. Petersburg where they submitted an application to the Governing Senate to allow them to settle another territory, separated from New Serbia. On 17 May 1753, Russian empress Elizabeth signed a decision to allow colonists from Pomorišje led by Šević to populate the territory between Bakhmut and Luhansk. The New Serbia was established and populated by Serb colonists, while colonists to the Slavo-Serbia, besides the Serb majority, include people of other ethnicity, such as Bulgarians, Aromanians, Vlachs and Greeks. Horvat tried to convince people brought by Šević to Slavo-Serbia to move to his New Serbia, but his attempts failed and only a small number of people moved using small boats to float downstream on the Dnieper.

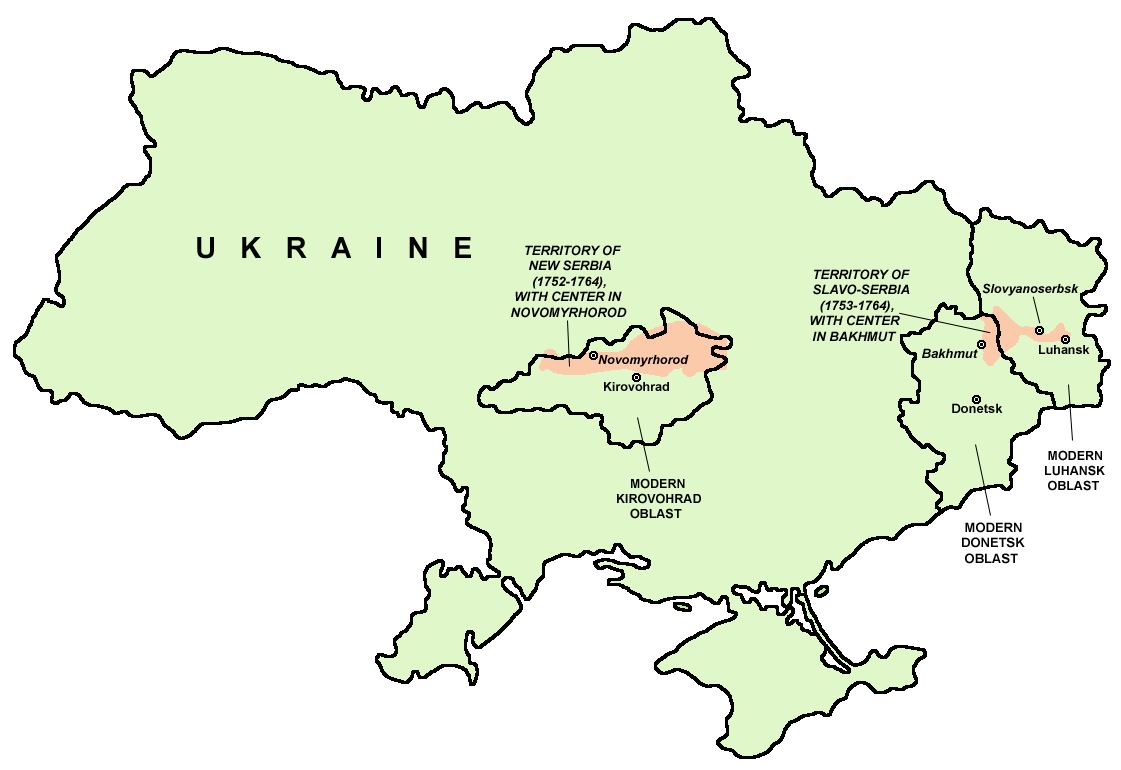
Map of modern-day Ukraine with New Serbia and Slavo-Serbia

Šević and his men were included in the Serb Hussar Regiment. During wartime, they fought in the army of the Russian Empire while in peacetime, they cultivated the land. The Serb Hussar Regiment participated in the Seven Years' War, together with regiments from New Serbia, under the command of Stepan Fyodorovich Apraksin. Cossacks did not accept new settlers as well as their government did. It was recorded that they made raids into New Serbia and Slavo-Serbia and that in one of those raids, they stole the horses of Jovan Šević. According to contemporary accounts, the land settled by Šević and other Serb military officers was cultivated and flourished. Slavo-Serbia was disestablished in 1764, which according to some authors happened soon after Šević's death.

== Legacy ==
Miloš Crnjanski described the migration to Russia in 1752 in his novel Migrations (Serbian: Сеобе). The territory of former Slavo-Serbia administrative region today belongs to the modern Ukrainian territories of Luhansk Oblast and Donetsk Oblast. A town in Luhansk Oblast (Slovianoserbsk) was developed from the village populated by one rota of Serb colonists. In its center, there is an impressive monument which depict Serb and Russian Hussars and Ukrainian Cossack. It was erected in 2003 to commemorate 250 years of Serb migration to this region. The inscription on Serbian, Ukrainian and Russian language which says, "There Are No Holier Ties Than Brotherhood Bonds".

== See also ==
- Ivan Shevich
- Rajko Depreradović
- Andrei Miloradovich
- Jovan Horvat
- Ivan Adamovich
- Avram Ratkov
- Nikolay Bogdanov
- Nikolay Depreradovich
- Ilya Duka
- Simeon Končarević
- Pavle Julinac
- Jovan Albanez
- Simeon Piščević
- Anto Gvozdenović
- Mikhail Miloradovich
- Semyon Zorich
- Peter Tekeli
- Georgi Emmanuel
- Marko Ivelich

== Sources ==
- Bataković, Dušan T., ed. (2005). Histoire du peuple serbe [History of the Serbian People] (in French). Lausanne: L’Age d’Homme. ISBN 9782825119587.
- Kostić, Mita; Lalić, Sredoje; Gavrilović, Slavko (2001). Nova Srbija i Slavenosrbija. Srpsko-ukrajinsko društvo. ISBN 978-86-902499-1-6.
