= Jovan Albanez =

Serbian military officer

- Native name: Јован Албанез
- Born: second half of the 17th century Podgorica
- Died: c. 1732 Russian Empire
- Allegiance: Russian Empire
- Rank: major (майор), captain (капитан)
- Commands: Serb Hussar Regiment
- Conflicts: Pruth River Campaign

Jovan Albanez (Serbian Cyrillic: Јован Албанез; fl. 1711–d. c. 1732) or Ivan Albanez (Serbian, Russian: Иван Албанез, Ukrainian: Іван Албанез) c. 1732) was a military officer of Montenegrin Serb origin who led the first group of colonists from the Military Frontier of the Habsburg monarchy to the Russian Empire in the first half of the 18th century.

== Early life ==
An ethnic Serb, born in the second half of the 17th century in Podgorica, his real name was Mojsije Mitanović (Serbian: Мојсије Митановић, Russian: Моисей Митанович). He was originally an Orthodox monk.

== Russian service ==
Owing to Rákóczi's War of Independence (1703–1711), the position of Serbian militiamen in the Military Frontier of the Habsburg monarchy was endangered. In 1704 the first Serbian attempts were made to offer their services to Imperial Russia in the latter's struggle against the Ottomans. Prior to the beginning of the Russo-Turkish War (1710–11) Russian Emperor Peter the Great invited Serbian militiamen and Serbs in general to join the Russian forces.

Albanez travelled to St. Petersburg with a Montenegrin delegation that was sent in 1711 together with vojvoda Slavuj Đaković (Russian: Славуй Требинскій), the third delegation sent to Russia by metropolitan Danilo. Albanez became a captain of a small Serb unit that took part in the Pruth River Campaign (1710–11), where he distinguished himself. He became known by the pseudonym Albanez. Russian captain Ivan Lukačević and colonel Mikhail Miloradovich (grandfather of Mikhail Miloradovich), both of Serb origin, were sent to Montenegro to deliver documents issued by emperor Peter the Great (and written by diplomat Sava Vladislavich, another Serb in Russian service) on 3 March 1711 that called the Balkan Orthodox to rise up against the Ottomans during the Pruth River Campaign. Miloradović and Lukačević arrived at Cetinje and delivered them to metropolitan Danilo, who had them read at a Montenegrin church assembly. This was the first Russian delegation to Montenegro. Danilo, Miloradović and Lukačević then organized military operations (such as the attack on Nikšić). These Serbs in Russian service provided the Russian state with valuable information on political and social matters and the status of Serbs in the Ottoman Empire (primarily those of Old Montenegro, Brda and Old Herzegovina).

Peter the Great eventually decided to expand this Serb unit and turn it into a separate Serbian regiment. In 1723 Peter the Great sent Albanez to the Pomorišje and Potisje regions of the Military Frontier of the Habsburg monarchy to recruit additional Serbian militiamen. The invitation letter carried by Albanez was signed by Peter the Great on 23 October 1723. Every military man who emigrated to Russia with his wife and children would be granted arable land, while those who emigrated with larger numbers of people were promised additional privileges. Albanez was quite successful with recruitment. On 5 May 1724, Albanez reported from the Habsburg Kingdom of Serbia that he had recruited ten officers, including one colonel. According to some sources, 459 Serbs emigrated to Russia in 1724, and 600 in 1725. A detailed list of the military unit commanded by Albanez was made in 1726. They formed a small military unit commanded by Albanez and referred to as the Serb Command. In 1727 Albanez was appointed the first commander of the newly established Serb Hussar Regiment.

== See also ==
- Rajko Depreradović
- Jovan Šević
- Jovan Horvat
- Andrei Miloradovich
- Nikolay Depreradovich
- Ivan Adamovich
- Avram Ratkov
- Nikolay Bogdanov
- Ilya Duka
- Ivan Shevich
- Simeon Končarević
- Pavle Julinac
- Peter Tekeli
- Ivan Lukačević
- Simeon Piščević
- Semyon Zorich
- Georgi Emmanuel
- Mikhail Miloradovich
- Anto Gvozdenović

== Sources ==
- P. M. Rudi︠a︡kov (1995). Seoba Srba u Rusiju u 18. veku. Službeni list SRJ. ISBN 9788635502502.
- Prudyakov, Pavlo (2003). "Переселение сербов в Россию в 18 веке" (PDF). pp. 359–.
- Institute for Slavic Studies (2011). "Chernogorcy v Rossii" (PDF). Indrik; Russian Academy of Sciences.
- Istorijski institut SR Crne Gore (1951). Istorijski zapisi. Vol. 4–5. Istorijski institut SR Crne Gore.
- Đorđević, Vladan (1912). Evropa i Crna Gora: Crna Gora između Turske, Rusije i Mletaka u XVIII veku. Sv. Sava.
- Popović, Nikola B. (1994). Srbija i carska Rusija. Službeni list SRJ. ISBN 9788635501963.
