= Andrei Miloradovich =

Russian military leader (1727–1796)

Andrei Stepanovich Miloradovich
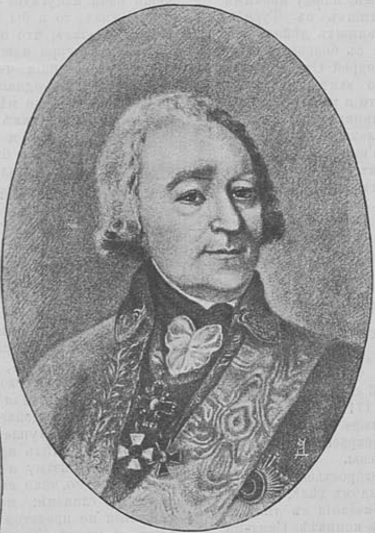
- Born: 1727; Pozniki, Cossack Hetmanate
- Died: 2 May 1796 (aged 68–69) Chernigov, Imperial Russia
- Allegiance: Russian Empire
- Branch: Army
- Service years: 1747–1796
- Rank: Lieutenant General
- Wars: Seven Years' War; Russo-Turkish War
- Awards: Order of St. George; Order of St. Vladimir; Order of Saint Anna; Order of Saint Alexander Nevsky

Andrei Stepanovich Miloradovich (Russian: Андре́й Степа́нович Милора́дович; 1727–2 May 1796) was a Russian military leader, statesman and lieutenant general. He is the father of general Mikhail Miloradovich.

== Biography ==
He was born in 1727 in the village of Pozniki in the Chornukhy (that became a sotnia town of Lubny Regiment of the Hetmanate). The Miloradovichs descended from an Eastern Orthodox Serbian family from Hum, in present-day Bosnia and Herzegovina, who rose to a station of prominent Bosnian Ottoman nobility of Sanjak of Herzegovina.

The Russian branch of the Miloradovich family was established in 1715, when Mikhail Miloradovich (the first) (Serbian Cyrillic: Михаило Милорадовић), one of three brothers recruited by Peter I to incite rebellion against the Turks four years earlier, fled from Herzegovina to Russia and joined Peter's service as a colonel. He was a commander of the Hadiach Regiment. Towards the end of Peter's reign he was imprisoned in connection with Pavlo Polubotok's treason case, but was spared from further misfortune by Peter's death. His grandson Andrey served thirty years in the Russian Army and later moved into civil administration as the Governor of Little Russia and the Chernigov governorate. After graduating from the Kiev Theological Academy, he entered the military service in Little Russia, and in 1747 he received the title of ensign; in 1749, he was promoted to a lieutenant of a Life Guards company. The Seven Years' War with Prussia from 1756 until 1762 gave Miloradovich a chance to show his courage, and gain several ranks on the field of honor, particularly in the battles of Kay, Kunersdorf and the Siege of Kolberg. In 1771 during the Russo Turkish War Brigadier Miloradovich, fighting under the command of Pyotr Rumyantsev, distinguished himself in the very first campaign. Rumyantsev's 1800 infantry soldiers and 300 Cossacks crossed the Danube and defeated a Turkish force of 7,000 at Măcin in the Dobrudja region of Romania. Rumyantsev, in his report to Empress Catherine II, wrote the following about the battle:

"... Major General Miloradovich, first with light actions that served to draw attention to himself, gained surface over the enemy at the town of Măcin, and on the 21st, having crossed to the fertile shore with his corps, attacked the enemy in their encampment at Măcin, ousted them, captured the town and a significant number of guns."

For this conspicuous act, Miloradovich was awarded the Order of Saint Anna, 1st degree and Empress Catherine II even reported the fact in her letters to Voltaire with whom she often corresponded.

Alexander Suvorov, Semyon Petrovich Ozerov (1725–1807) and Miloradovich stood out as heroes of the Battle of Kozludzha in 1773; the defeat of the Turks was complete. As a reward for his brave actions in the war of 1771–1774, Miloradovich received the Order of St. George, 3rd degree (No. 44) on 10 July 1775. In addition, he was given the Voronky village in the Horodyshche sotnia of Lubny regiment. In 1779, Miloradovich was promoted to lieutenant general and soon was appointed the governor of the newly established Chernigov Governorate, which he ruled for more than fifteen years, but the governorship existed for a relatively short time and was replaced by the establishment of Little Russia. In 1786 he was awarded the Order of Saint Vladimir, 2nd degree and the Order of Saint Alexander Nevsky.

He died on 2 May 1796 in Chernigov, and was buried in the Yeletskyi Dormition Monastery.

The Miloradović noble family is listed in the nobility of the Russian Empire.

== Awards and decorations ==
- Order of Saint Anna, 1st degree (1773)
- Order of St. George, 3rd degree (No.44; 10 July 1775)
- Order of Saint Vladimir, 2nd degree (1786)
- Order of Saint Alexander Nevsky (1786)

== See also ==
- Peter Mikhailovich Kaptzevich
- Mikhail Miloradovich
- Ivan Shevich
- Avram Ratkov
- Ivan Adamovich
- Nikolay Bogdanov
- Nikolay Depreradovich
- Ivan Lukačević (soldier)
- Jovan Šević
- Jovan Albanez
- Simeon Piščević
- Anto Gvozdenović
- Semyon Zorich
- Peter Tekeli
- Georgi Emmanuel
- Dejan Subotić
- Fedor Yakovlevich Mirkovich
- Marko Ivelich
- Rajko Depreradović
- Skarzynski
