= Simeon Piščević =

Serbian memoirist (1731–1798)

Simeon Piščević (Šid, 4 September 1731 – Imperial Russia, November 1798) was a Serbian memoirist and imperial Russian general.

== Biography ==
Originally from the famed Serbian Paštrovići tribe, the Piščević family took their name from their own native village of Pišči. During the Great Migration of 1690, the Piščević family (in question)^{[clarify]} were soldiers in the Austrian service. Simeon's grandfather, Gavril(o) Piščević, was a light infantry officer on the Military Frontier dividing the Ottoman and Habsburg empires. Simeon's father Stevan Piščević was also a Military Frontier officer in the service of Empress Maria Theresa. His mother was from the famous Vitković family and Simeon went to school away from his parents' home in the Petrovaradin šanac (later to become Novi Sad), lodging with his uncle, Sekula Vitković, who in 1731 was appointed regimental commander of the Danube Serbian Militia.

Simeon Piščević received his education in Šid, Novi Sad, Segedin, Osijek and Vienna. During the last two years of the War of the Austrian Succession, (1741–1748) Stevan Piščević took Simeon, his son, along as a volunteer in the Slavonian regiment of the Austrian Army. Being well-educated Simeon became an adjutant in no time. At 17 Simeon was promoted to the rank of lieutenant in the Srem Hussar regiment. In 1749 General Jovan Šević gave him the rank of captain and ordered him to prepare to move to Russia. In the mid-eighteenth century, the demilitarization of the Military Frontier of the Tisza River and Mures River districts compelled thousands of Serb frontiersmen to immigrate to Russia where they established a number of settlements, notably New Serbia and Slavo-Serbia. A reorganization of Serb border militias in Slavonia lead to the immigration of a number of high-ranking officers who distinguished themselves in the Russian military service, Peter Tekeli, Semyon Zorich, Rajko Depreradović, Jovan Horvat, Jovan Šević and Simeon Piščević, among many others.

Piščević received his Russian visa four years later (1753), but it would be another three years before he made the move. He first emigrated to Imperial Russia in 1756, ending up in the Russian Imperial Army.

All Serbian settlements were called "retrenchments" in the popular idiom, although only a few of them were fortified. Piščević wrote that such districts (oblast) as Hlyns'k, Krylov, and Kryukiv in today's Ukraine were the only fortified places in the Pandur regiment. Simeon Piščević left a most vivid description of General Jovan Horvat's broad use of powers. He refers to the latter as "our absolute and tyrannical ruler" and, sometimes with indignation, sometimes with envy for Horvat's versatility, quotes many episodes, shocking even to contemporaries, who were accustomed to the crude rule of singular power.

After the death of his father Stevan who was himself in the Russian service, in 1777 Piščević traveled to St. Petersburg where he met Potemkin and was received at an audience with the Empress Catherine the Great. Promoted to the rank of Major-General he was given a governorship in the Mogilev province.

Piščević had a son, Aleksandar, who also served in the Imperial Russian Army, and later wrote about his experiences in a biography entitled Moj život (My Life).

== Works ==
"The Diary of General Piščević" (Zapisi Djenerala Piščevića) which first appeared in Russian towards the end of the 19th century, was a model of Serbian eighteenth-century memoirist literature and was ranked equal to the "Memoirs of Prota Matija Nenadović" about the Serbian Uprising of 1804. Piščević tells about the Serbian migration to Imperial Russia, Serbian activities there, and his own role in this emigration. He also describes the participation of Hungarian Serbs in the war between Austria and France in 1774–1775. He emphasized that the Islamized Turkish subjects in Bosnia are Serbs like all the rest, for they have the "Serbian language and traditions" (Jezik i obicaji srpski), Piščević is using for his time modern terminology, and together with Dositej Obradović, but earlier than Stevan Stratimirović, Lukijan Mušicki and Vuk Karadžić, and showing knowledge of the language spoken by the common folk. In the section on the Turks, Simeon Piščević refers to the German geographer and scholar Johann Hubner's Kurtze Fregen aus der neuen und eaten Geographie (Regensburg und Wein, 1755). The other work by Simeon Piščević is "Knjiga o naciji srpskoj" (A Book About the Serbian Nation).

== See also ==
- Andrei Miloradovich
- Avram Ratkov
- Jovan Horvat
- Ivan Adamovich
- Nikolay Bogdanov
- Matija Zmajević
- Jovan Šević
- Jovan Albanez
- Peter Tekeli
- Mikhail Miloradovich
- Pavle Julinac
- Marko Ivelich

== Sources ==
- Jovan Skerlić, Istorija nove srpske književnosti (Belgrade, 1914)
