= Ivan Adamovich =

Russian general

Ivan Stepanovich Adamovich
- Born: 1752; Slavo-Serbia, Imperial Russia
- Died: after 1813; Saint Petersburg, Imperial Russia
- Military career
- Allegiance: Russian Empire
- Branch: Army
- Service years: ?–1798; 1806–1813
- Rank: Major General
- Conflicts: Persian Expedition of 1796; War of the Fourth Coalition; War of the Fifth Coalition; Patriotic War of 1812; Battle of Borodino
- Awards: Order of St. Anna 2nd class Golden Sword for Bravery

Ivan Stepanovich Adamovich (Russian: Иван Степанович Адамович; 1752–1813) was a highly decorated Russian general who fought at the Battle of Borodino, commanding the 1st Corps of the Reserve Army.

Ivan Adamovich fought the Ottoman Turks and Napoleonic France as a seasoned and highly experienced warrior who long ago earned his stripes under fire. In 1794, Adamovich was pensioned with the rank of major general, aged 41. It was Alexander I, Paul I's successor, who recalled him to active service on 17 September 1812 with great honors. The events of 1812 forced him to come out of retirement and engage himself in the battle against the invading French by leading the 1st Corps of the Reserve Army during the Battle of Borodino. The last written traces about him are from 1813 where it is said that he died with his boots on while serving Imperial Russia.

== Biography ==
Adamovich came from an old noble family based in the region of the Serbian Banat Military Frontier (now part of Serbia and Romania), where his father Stepan Adamovich, an officer in the Austrian military in 1752 emigrated with his family to Imperial Russia. After graduating from the Cadet Corps in Saint Petersburg, he joined the Imperial Russian Army as a young, career soldier.

He was a lieutenant colonel with the Preobrazhensky Regiment before being promoted to major general and appointed chef of the Pavlovsky Grenadier Regiment on 14 February 1789. He was awarded the Russian Order of Saint Anna on 10 November 1796. Two years later, on 26 August 1798, he took his first retirement, but a few years later he became determined to be in the army, once again. On 8 January 1807, during the War of the Fourth Coalition, he was awarded a Golden Weapon "For Bravery". On 13 May 1809 a patent for the rank of General was issued to Major General Ivan Adamovich signed by Alexander I and Count Aleksey Arakcheyev for Adamovich's conspicuous role in the War of the Fifth Coalition. Three years later, he retired for the second time, but on 5 September 1812, he returned to the army once again, joining his comrade-at-arms in the Battle of Borodino.

In the autumn of 1812 Field Marshal Mikhail Kutuzov determined to create a proper reserve from the Narodnoe Opolchenie or people's militia. In October he sent Ivan Adamovich to Arzramas to organize reserve formations as part of this program. This done, in 1813 Adamovich was named to serve as commander of one of four brigades making up to 20,000- men Reserve Army that backed the main Russian force as it crossed the Niemen river.

Finally, on 16 December 1813, he retired for good.

== Awards and decorations ==
- Order of Saint Anna, 2nd degree (10 November 1796)
- Golden Weapon "For Bravery" (8 January 1807)

== See also ==
- Peter Ivanovich Ivelich
- Ivan Shevich
- Andrei Miloradovich
- Avram Ratkov
- Nikolay Bogdanov
- Nikolay Depreradovich
- Mikhail Miloradovich
- Georgi Emmanuel
- Ilya Duka
- Jovan Albanez
- Jovan Šević
- Jovan Horvat
- Semyon Zorich
- Anto Gvozdenović
- Marko Ivanovich Voinovich
- Matija Zmajević
