= Nikolay Depreradovich =

Russian general

Nikolai Ivanovich Depreradovich
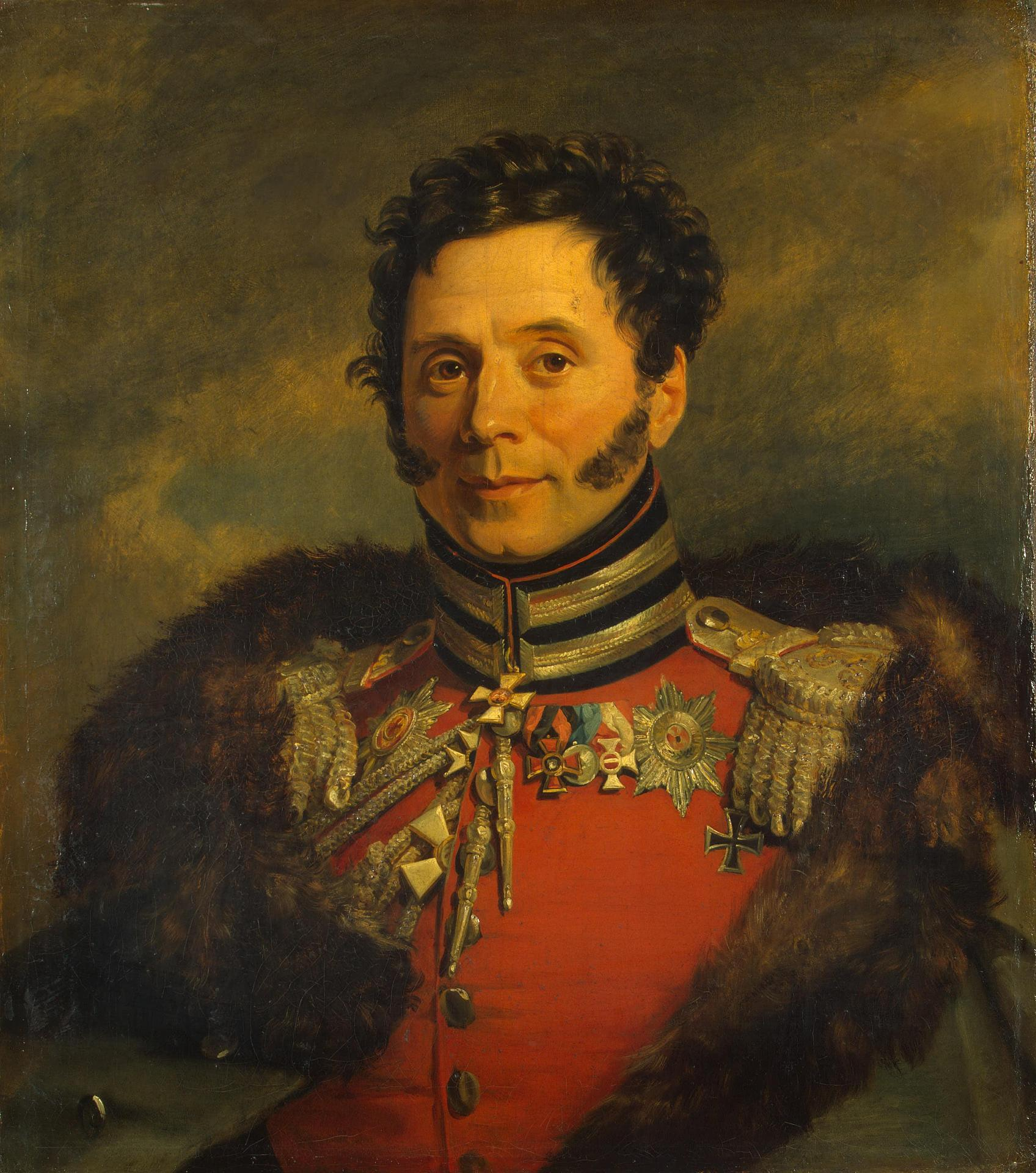
- Portrait by George Dawe in the Military Gallery of the Winter Palace
- Native name: Nikola Preradović
- Born: 23 October 1767; Novorossiya, Imperial Russia
- Died: 16 December 1843 (aged 76) St. Petersburg, Imperial Russia
- Allegiance: Russian Empire
- Branch: Army
- Service years: 1777–1835
- Rank: General of the Cavalry
- Commands: Guard Reserve Cavalry Corps
- Wars: Russo-Turkish War (1787–1792); War of the Third Coalition; Battle of Austerlitz; War of the Fourth Coalition; Battle of Eylau; Battle of Friedland; Patriotic War of 1812; Battle of Vitebsk; Battle of Smolensk; Battle of Borodino; Battle of Tarutino; Battle of Maloyaroslavets; Battle of Krasnoi; War of the Sixth Coalition; Battle of Kulm; Battle of Lützen; Battle of Bautzen; Battle of Dresden
- Awards: Order of St. George; Order of the Red Eagle; Order of St. Vladimir; Order of Saint Anna; Order of Saint Alexander Nevsky; Order of St. John of Jerusalem; Military Order of Maria Theresa; Iron Cross; Gold Sword for Bravery

Nikolai Ivanovich Depreradovich (Russian: Депрерадович, Николай Иванович; Serbian: Никола Прерадовић; 23 October 1767 in Novorossiya, Imperial Russia – 16 December 1843 in St. Peterburg, Imperial Russia) was one of the most decorated Russian generals who fought against Napoleonic France. He was a general of the cavalry and adjutant general who took part both in Napoleonic Wars and Finnish Wars. His family, with roots in Serbian lands, moved to Imperial Russia in 1752.

He played an important role with Illarion Vasilyevich Vasilchikov (1776–1847) in the grand strategy of the Russian Empire after Alexander I ascended the throne.

== Biography ==
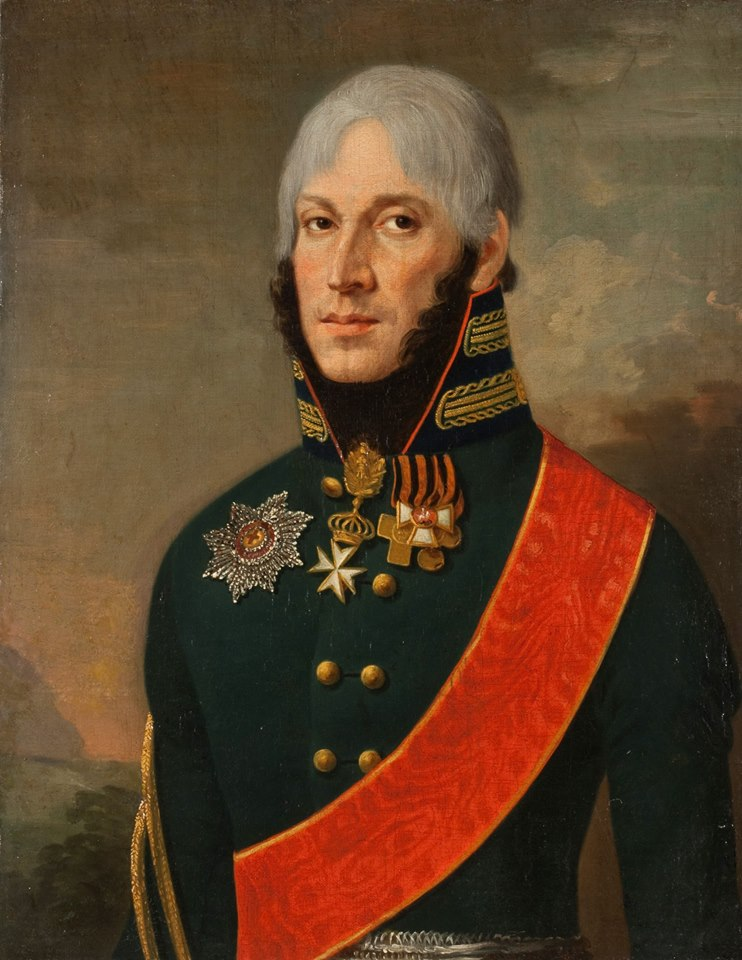
Major General Leontii Depreradovich, brother of Nikolay

He was a Serb originally from an old border officer's family that moved from what was then part of the Austrian Empire's Military Frontier to Slavo-Serbia in Imperial Russia. His brother, Leontii Depreradovich, came close to achieving the same success if it were not for a scandal that got him dismissed from the army.

At the age of ten, Depreradovich enlisted as a cadet in the Volozh Hussar Regiment on 12 December 1777. He rose to sub-lieutenant in 1782 at 15. He fought in the Russo-Turkish War (1787–1791) at Koushani, Akkerman, and Bender, and commanded the Semyonovsky Regiment, from 1799 to 1807.

Depreradovich participated in the last wars of Empress Catherine the Great against the Turks and Poles. He was one of the officers involved in the conspiracy against Paul I in favor of the son, Alexander I.

On May 16, 1803, he was promoted to major general and appointed commander of the Chevalier Guard Regiment. In this position, he served during all the wars with Napoleon. On 26 November 1804, he was awarded the Order of St. George 4th class. Commanding the chevalier-guardsmen, he led a brilliant attack near Austerlitz, giving the guard the opportunity to retreat. The regiment lost 15 officers and 200 privates during the attack. On 24 February 1806, he was awarded the Order of St. George, 3rd class.

Depreradovich participated in all the major battles of the Eylau Campaign of 1806–1807.

In 1810, he was appointed the commander of the 1st Cuirassier Division, which at the beginning of the Patriotic War of 1812 was part of the 1st Western Army. In this capacity, Depreradovich participated in the Patriotic War of 1812 and foreign campaigns. On 30 August 1813, he was promoted to the rank of lieutenant general. Depreradovich especially distinguished himself in the battles of Kulm and Fère-Champenoise. At Fère-Champenoise, it was Depreradovich's actions that decided the outcome of the battle.

He rose to general of the cavalry and adjutant general on 3 September 1826 and commanded the Guard Reserve Cavalry Corps between 14 April 1833 and 12 March 1835.

He died on 28 December 1843. He was 76.

== See also ==
- Peter Mikhailovich Kaptzevich
- Peter Ivanovich Ivelich
- Nikolay Vuich
- Ivan Shevich
- Andrei Miloradovich
- Avram Ratkov
- Ivan Adamovich
- Nikolay Bogdanov
- Ilya Duka
- Georgi Emmanuel
- Mikhail Miloradovich
- Semyon Zorich
- Peter Tekeli
- Marko Ivelich
