= Dmitry Horvat =

Russian lieutenant general

Dmitry Leonidovich Horvat
- Дмитрий Леонидович Хорват
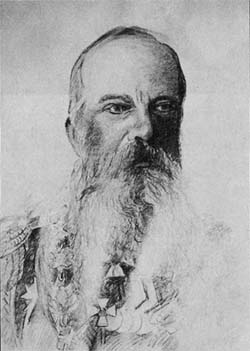
- Portrait of Horvat

Commissioner of the Provisional Government on the CER
- In office 1917–1920
- Preceded by: Position established
- Succeeded by: Position dissolved

Personal details
- Born: July 25, 1858 Kremenchug, Poltava Governorate, Russian Empire
- Died: May 16, 1937 (aged 78) Beijing
- Spouse: Camilla Albertovna Benois
- Children: Evdokia Dmitrievna Williams
- Awards: Order of the White Eagle; Order of Saint Stanislaus; Order of Saint Vladimir; Order of Saint Anna

Military service
- Allegiance: Russian Empire; Provisional Siberian Government; Russian State
- Branch/service: Imperial Russian Army; White Army
- Years of service: 1878–1920
- Rank: Lieutenant general
- Battles/wars: Russo-Turkish War (1877–1878); Russian Civil War

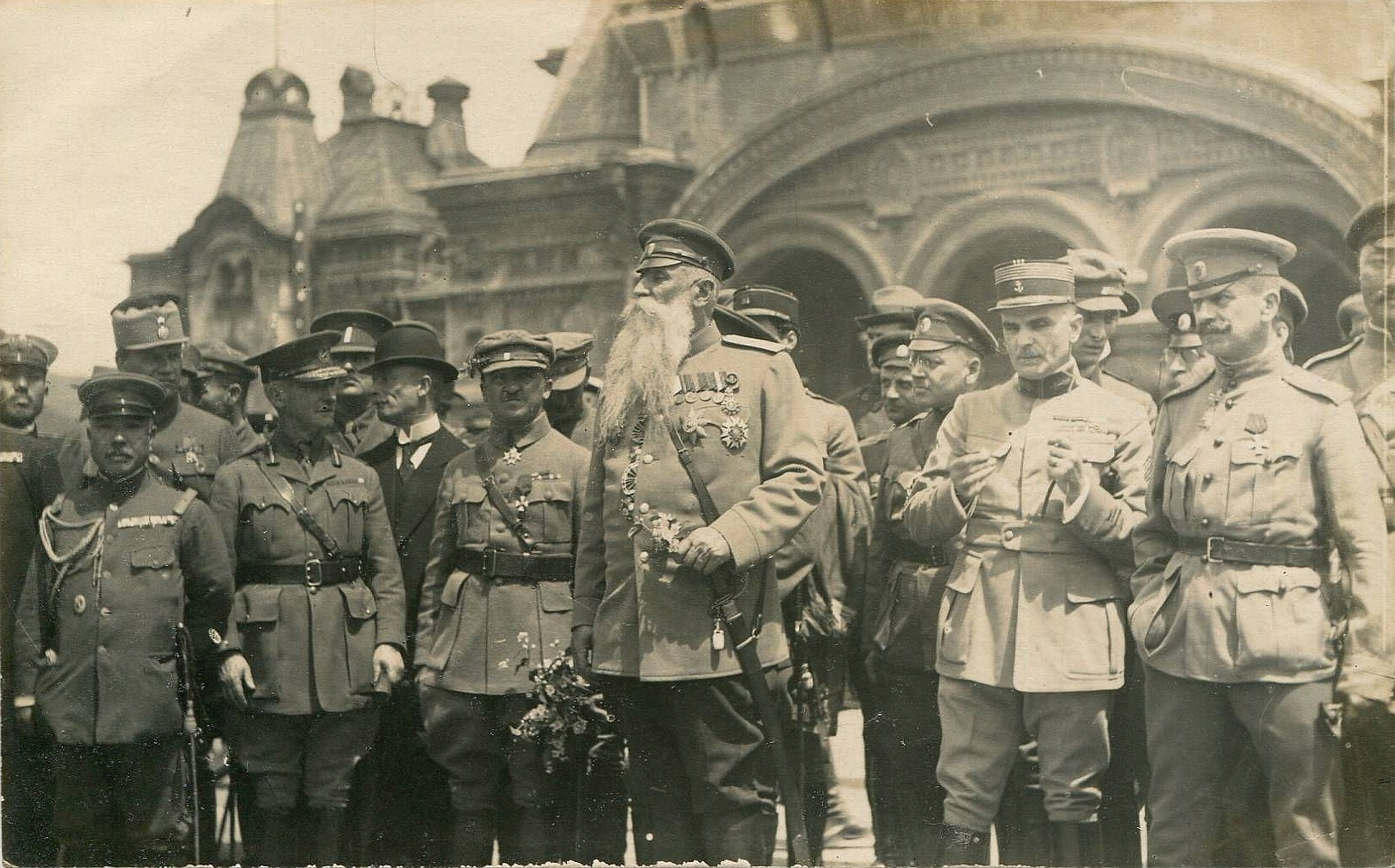
General Horvat in Vladivostok, 1918

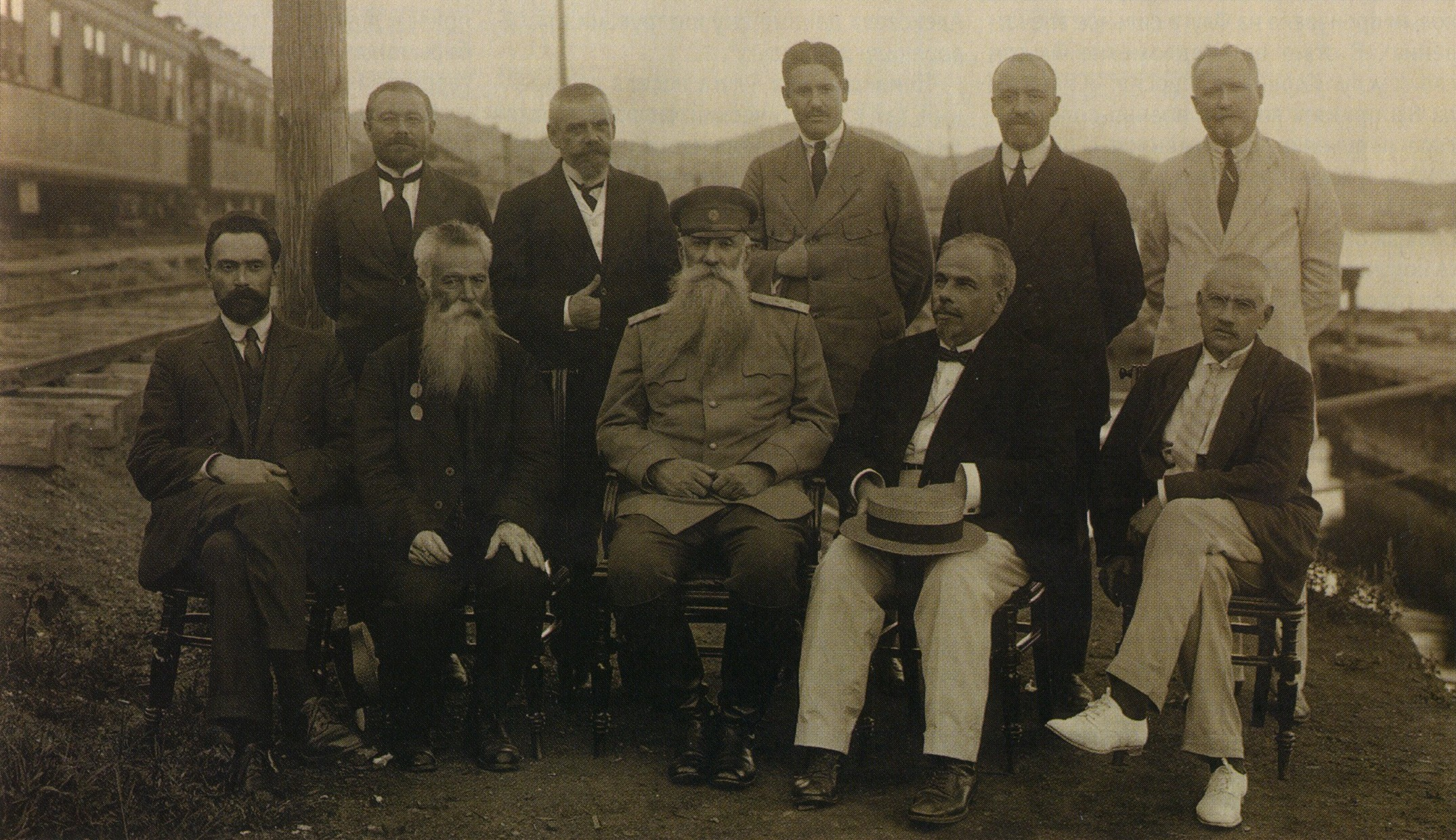
Government (business office) of General Dmitry Horvat. Vladivostok, 1918. Sitting: Leonid Ustrugov, Mikhail Kursky, Dmitry Horvat, Stepan Vostrotin, Vasily Flug. Standing: Sergey Taskin, Vasily Alferev, Alexander Okorokov, Vladimir Glukharyov, Professor Jacob Brandt

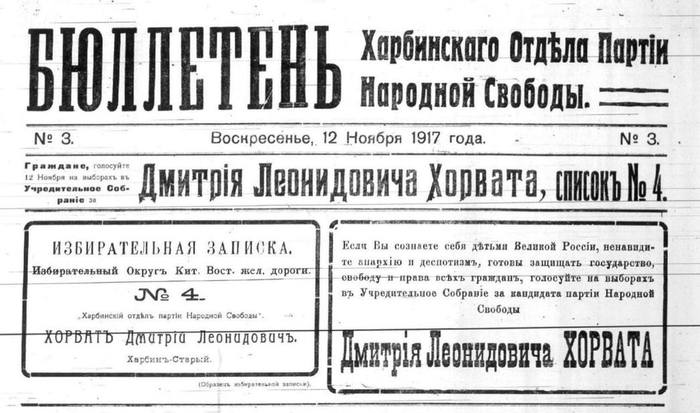
Electoral propaganda of the Kadet Party for Horvat's candidature for the Chinese Eastern Railway electoral district in the 1917 Russian Constituent Assembly election.

Dmitry Leonidovich Horvat (Note: Russian: Дмитрий Леонидович Хорват, romanized: Dmitry Leonidovich Khorvat) (25 July [O.S. 13 July] 1859 – May 16, 1937), a Russian lieutenant general and railway engineer, worked on and led various sections of the Russian Empire's railways during his career. During the Russian Civil War of 1917 to 1922 he became one of the leaders of the White movement, taking control of the Chinese Eastern Railway until 1919.

== Biography ==
=== Early life and career ===
Horvat was born in Kremenchug, Kremenchugsky Uyezd, Poltava Governorate, Russian Empire on July 25, 1859, to a family of hereditary nobles of the Kherson Governorate. His father was the magistrate judge Leonid Nikolaevich Horvat, the great-grandson of General Jovan Horvat, who founded New Serbia. His mother was Baroness Maria Pilar von Pilhau, one of the daughters of General Karl Pilar von Pilhau and the great-granddaughter of Field Marshal Mikhail Kutuzov.

In 1875, he entered the Nikolaevsky Engineering School, from which he graduated in 1878 in the 1st category and in the rank of second lieutenant, and was assigned to a Lifeguard Sapper Battalion. He participated in the Russo-Turkish War of 1877–78, serving from May to September 1878 in the village of Stefano, regularly making business trips to the engineering part to take gunpowder, electric carriages and other equipment to the city of Ruschuk and other cities.

In October 1881, he passed the entrance examinations and entered the junior class of the Nikolaev Academy of Engineering, where he was expelled two years later due to "domestic circumstances". He would return to his battalion and work as a teacher in the training team at the battalion.

=== Railway service ===
In March 1885, Horvat was promoted to lieutenant and in June was assigned to the construction of the Trans-Caspian military railway, having been appointed to the position of official on special assignments under General Mikhail Annenkov, head of road construction. The Trans-Caspian Military Railway is notable for the fact that it became the first railway in the world, built in a loose sand area. Its construction was initially intended for the strategic needs of the military department of the Russian Empire, but in 1899 it was passed to the civilian Ministry of Railways.

The laying of the railway track superstructure was carried out by two railway battalions. As the road was built and stations opened, all posts in the service of the railway's operation, such as track repair, were also performed by the members of these battalions: officers, non-commissioned officers, and privates. Horvat, being a special assignment officer of the construction manager, had to do the work of the foreman, the traveling foreman, and even the locomotive engineer in order to complete and carry out the operation of the railway track in the shortest possible time.

Due to his natural talents and exceptional service qualities, he quickly moved up in the service, occupied several posts. In 1889, when the railway line was built to the city of Samarkand, he was appointed head of the operating distance of the Samarkand section of the Trans-Caspian military railway. in April 1889 he was promoted to the rank of stabs-kapitan, and in 1894 he was promoted to captain.

In 1895, he was assigned to the Ussuri krai, for the construction of the Ussuri railway, as the head of the 1st Ussuri battalion.

In May 1898, promoted to colonel. In September 1896, he was appointed the head of the South Ussuriisk railway, leaving his previous post. In April 1899, he became the Acting Head of the Trans-Caspian Railway. In November 1902, he received an offer to take the post of manager of the then Chinese Eastern Railway (CER). In 1903, he became the head of construction, then, until April 27, 1918, he was promoted to the manager of the CER. He worked under the Minister of Finance as the head of the department in charge of the CER.

In 1904, he was promoted to the rank of Major general and received seniority on November 26, 1906, for distinction. On December 6, 1911, he was promoted to the rank of lieutenant general, and received seniority on November 26, 1912, for distinction.

=== Russian Civil War ===
After the February Revolution of 1917 he became the Commissioner of the Provisional Government on the CER.

After the October Revolution of 1917, the CER was still in full order, and life was generally stable. People believed that as long as Horvat was there, everyone would be protected from misfortunes. The area around the CER became known as "Happy, blessed Horvatia". However, due to the collapse of central power in Russia, the area was effectively independent, left to its own devices.

General Horvat did not long agree on general persuasion to take upon himself the heavy burden of exercising the authority of the supreme power, but on July 10, 1918, he conceded, declaring himself the Temporary Ruler until Russian national sovereignty was restored. The acting manager of the CER from the period of April 28, 1918, to November 5, 1920, was the former head of the road traction service engineer Vasiliy Lachinov. He remained in this high ranking post until September 13, 1918, when, after long and difficult negotiations, he recognized the Provisional Siberian Government. He transferred his sovereign powers to the Provisional Government, resigning as the Temporary Ruler and remaining High Commissioner for the Far East. Having relinquished the title of Temporary Supreme Ruler, he became the Supreme Commissioner in the Far East, with the subordination of all troops and military flotillas located in the region. He retained his authority after the Provisional All-Russian Government formed in the city of Ufa, and after power passed to Supreme Ruler, Admiral Alexander Kolchak.

On August 31, 1919, with the appointment of General Rozanov as the Chief of the Amur Region, General Horvat returned from Vladivostok to Harbin. There he remained at the head of the administration of a vast territory of the railway alienation line until the Karakhan Manifesto appeared, in which the Bolshevik government relinquished Russian rights over the CER to China.

=== Emigration ===
After the Karakhan Manifesto was given to China, Horvat retired from the railway and in 1920 left for Beijing, where he engaged in political and social activities. From 1921 to 1924, he served as the Advisor to the Society of the Chinese Eastern Railway in Beijing, and starting in 1924, he served as the Chairman of the Department of the Russian All-Military Union in China. He remained there until his death, being the officially recognized head of the Russian emigrés in the Far East. He worked tirelessly to protect the rights of émigrés and arranged their well-being.

He was buried near one of the walls of the Church of All Holy Martyrs in the Beijing spiritual mission.

== Family ==
- Wife – Camilla Albertovna Benois (1879 – July 4, 1959, Vancouver) – the daughter of the architect Albert Benois.
- Son – Dmitry Dmitrievich Horvat, wife – Olga Olegovna (born Isaeva);
- Daughter – Evdokia Dmitrievna Williams.

== Military ranks ==
- Entered the service (September 1, 1875);
- Podpraporshchik (April 16, 1878);
- Praporshchik (May 11, 1879);
- Lieutenant (March 24, 1885);
- Staff-captain (April 6, 1889);
- Captain (August 30, 1894);
- Colonel (May 17, 1896);
- Major general (November 26, 1906);
- Lieutenant general (November 26, 1912).

== Awards ==
- Order of Saint Stanislaus, 3rd class (1889);
- Order of Saint Anna, 3rd class (1893);
- Order of Saint Stanislaus, 2nd class (1895);
- Order of Saint Anna, 2nd class (1899);
- Order of Saint Vladimir, 3rd class (1902);
- Order of Saint Stanislaus, 1st class (1905);
- Order of Saint Anna, 1st class (1905);
- Order of Saint Vladimir, 2nd class (1910);
- Order of the White Eagle (1915).

foreign:

- Golden Star of the Order of Noble Bukhara, 2nd class (1892);
- Tunisian Officer's Cross of Order of Glory (1897);
- Prussian Order of the Crown, 2nd class (1900);
- Golden Star of the Order of Noble Bukhara, 1st class (1901).

== See also ==
- Jovan Horvat
- Chinese Eastern Railway
- White Army
