= Anto Gvozdenović =

Montenegrin diplomat and general (1853–1935)

- Анто Гвозденовић
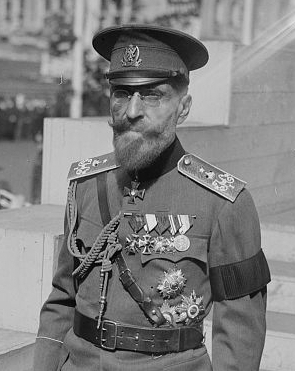

Co-regent of Kingdom of Montenegro
- In office 7 March 1921 – 17 March 1923 Serving with Milena of Montenegro
- Nominated by: Milena of Montenegro
- Monarch: Michael
- Preceded by: Danilo (as king)
- Succeeded by: Himself (as regent)

Regent of Kingdom of Montenegro
- In office 17 March 1923 – 14 September 1929
- Monarch: Michael, Prince of Montenegro
- Preceded by: Himself and Milena Vukotić (as co-regents)
- Succeeded by: Mihailo renounced his dynasty's claim to the throne of Montenegro and declared allegiance to the Kingdom of Yugoslavia.

7th Prime Minister of the Kingdom of Montenegro in Exile
- In office 23 September 1922 – 14 September 1929
- Monarch: Michael
- Regent: Milena Vukotić; Himself
- Preceded by: Milutin Vučinić
- Succeeded by: Position abolished

7th Minister of Foreign Affairs of Kingdom of Montenegro in-Exile
- In office 23 September 1922 – 14 September 1929
- Monarch: Michael
- Prime Minister: Himself
- Regents: Milena Vukotić; Himself
- Preceded by: Pero Šoć
- Succeeded by: Position dissolved

1st Minister Plenipotenciary of Kingdom of Montenegro to the United States
- In office 20 September 1918 – 18 December 1918
- Monarch: Nicolas I
- President: U.S president Woodrow Wilson
- Prime Minister: Evgenije Popović
- Minister of Foreign Affairs: Evgenije Popović
- Preceded by: Position created
- Succeeded by: Yefrem Simitch

Personal details
- Born: 26 January 1853 Ćeklići, Montenegro
- Died: 2 September 1935 (aged 82) Ćeklići, Yugoslavia
- Occupation: General, politician

Anto Gvozdenović (Serbian Cyrillic: Анто Гвозденовић; 26 January 1853 – 2 September 1935) was a Montenegrin, Russian, and French general, a member of the Imperial Russian Privy Council, and a diplomat and statesman.

== Biography ==
A descendant of the Montenegrin royal family and close associate of the exiled King Nikola, he was appointed ambassador of Montenegro to the United States of America in 1918. Later he served as the President (Prime Minister) of the Government-in-exile of Montenegro for two terms and the Regent to Michael, Prince of Montenegro.
