= Semyon Zorich =

Imperial Russian lieutenant-general and count of the Holy Roman Empire

Count Semyon Zorich
- Simeon Zorić
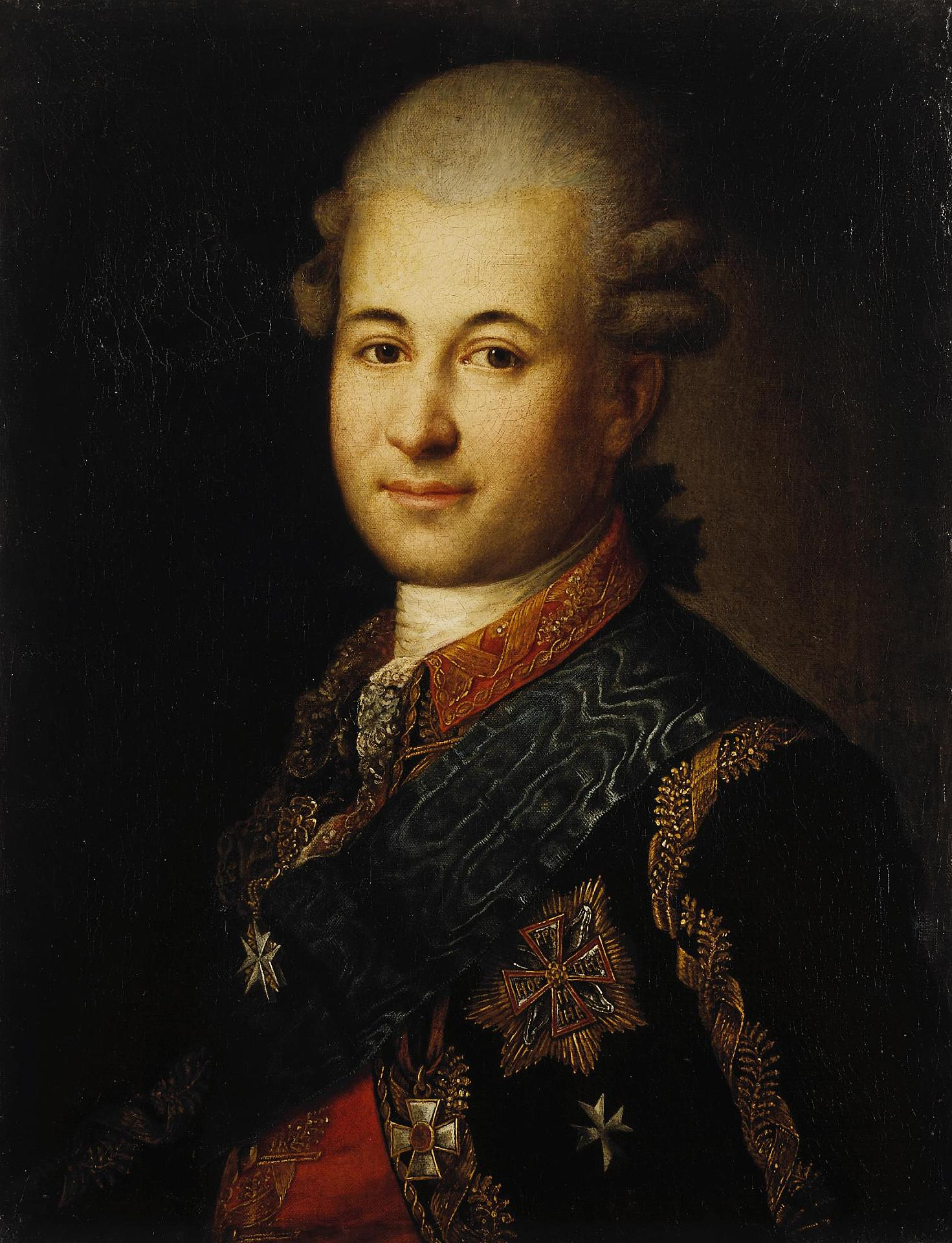
- Portrait, 1790–1800
- Born: 1 September 1743; Čurug, Military Frontier, Austrian Empire
- Died: 6 November 1799 (aged 56)
- Military career
- Allegiance: Russia
- Service years: 1754–1799
- Rank: Lieutenant General
- Unit: 12th Akhtyr Hussar Regiment
- Conflicts: Seven Years' War; Russo-Turkish War (1768–1774)
- Awards: Order of the White Eagle; Order of the Sword; Order of St. George

Count Semyon Zorich (1743–1799) was a Serbian-born Russian lieutenant-general and count of the Holy Roman Empire. He served Russia against the Prussians and Turks. A member of the Russian court, he was presented to Empress Catherine the Great by Grigory Potemkin and, after having been tested by Praskovja Bruce and doctor Rogerson, became the Empress' lover. He was most influential in the commercial development of Shklov and Mogilev.

== Sources ==
- "Зорич, Семен Гаврилович" . Brockhaus and Efron Encyclopedic Dictionary (in Russian). 1906.
