= Fyodor Uvarov =

Russian general of cavalry

Fyodor Petrovich Uvarov
- Фёдор Петрович Уваров
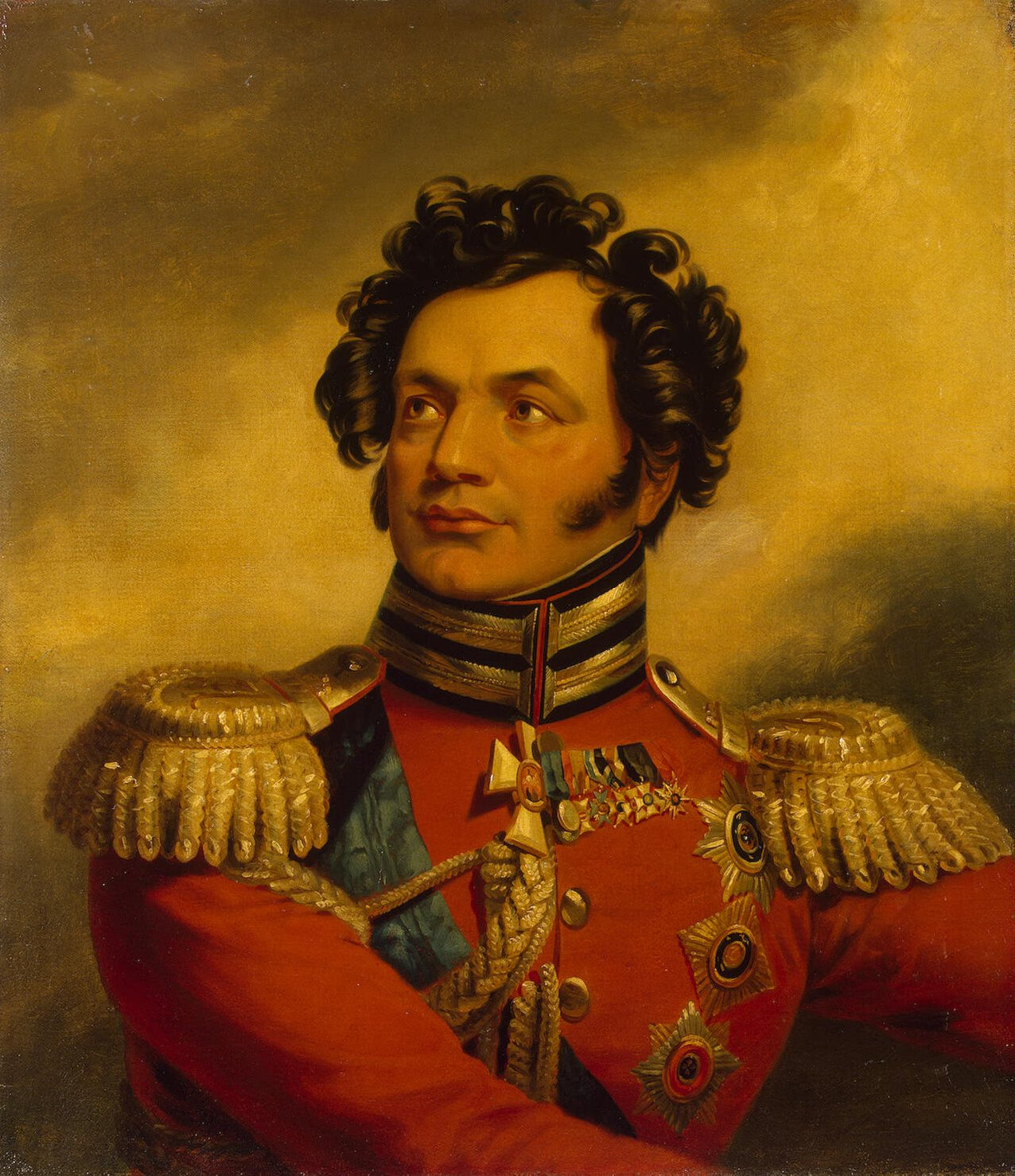
- Portrait by George Dawe (1824) in the Hermitage Museum
- Born: 27 April 1769 (Note: Old Style date: 16 April 1769); Venyovsky Uyezd, Tula Governorate
- Died: 2 December 1824 (55) (Note: Old Style date: 20 November 1824); Saint Petersburg, Saint Petersburg Governorate
- Other name: Fedor or Feodor (first name)
- Relatives: ru:House of Uvarov
- Military career
- Allegiance: Russia
- Branch: Imperial Russian Army
- Service years: 1775–1823
- Rank: General of the cavalry Adjutant general
- Commands: Russian Guards
- Awards: Order of St. George 3rd (1806) & 2nd (1810) degrees Order of St. Alexander Nevsky (1806); Order of St. Vladimir 1st degree (1814); Order of St. Andrew (1823); Golden Weapon for Bravery (1807)

Member of the State Council
- In office 1823–posthumously
- Monarch: Alexander

Fyodor Petrovich Uvarov (Note: Russian: Фёдор Петро́вич Ува́ров) (27 April 1769 – 2 December 1824) was a Russian military commander, who received the rank of general of the cavalry.

== Biography ==
He was the participant in the Russo-Swedish War (1788–1790), Polish–Russian War of 1792, and Kościuszko Uprising (1794). During the Coalition Wars, he participated in the Battle of Austerlitz (1805) and in the battles in Prussia (1807), including Friedland. From 1807 he commanded the Guards Cavalry Brigade. In the Russo-Turkish War (1806–1812), in 1810, he commanded the vanguard of the Army of the Danube. In the Patriotic War, he was the commander of the 1st Reserve Cavalry Corps. At the Battle of Borodino, at the lead of this corps and Cossacks together with Matvei Platov, he attacked the left flank of Napoleon's army, thanks to which Bonaparte was unable to bring his Imperial Guard into action.

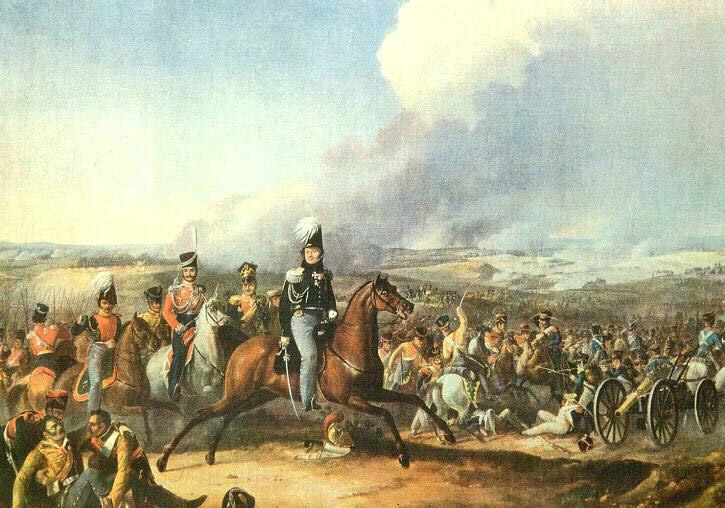
Attack of the Uvarov Cavalry at Borodino, painting by Auguste-Joseph Desarnod in the Hermitage

He further participated in the counteroffensive, namely at Tarutino, Maloyaroslavets. Together with Platov, he led raids in the battles of Vyazma and Krasny. From 1813 he served under Alexander I of Russia. During his campaigns abroad (1813–14), he participated at Bautzen, Dresden, Kulm, and Leipzig. From 1821 he commanded the Guard Corps. In 1823 he became a member of the State Council.

== Sources ==
- "Уваров Фёдор Петрович" [Uvarov Fyodor Petrovich]. Great Russian Encyclopedia. 2023.
