= Léonard Jean Aubry Huard de Saint-Aubin =

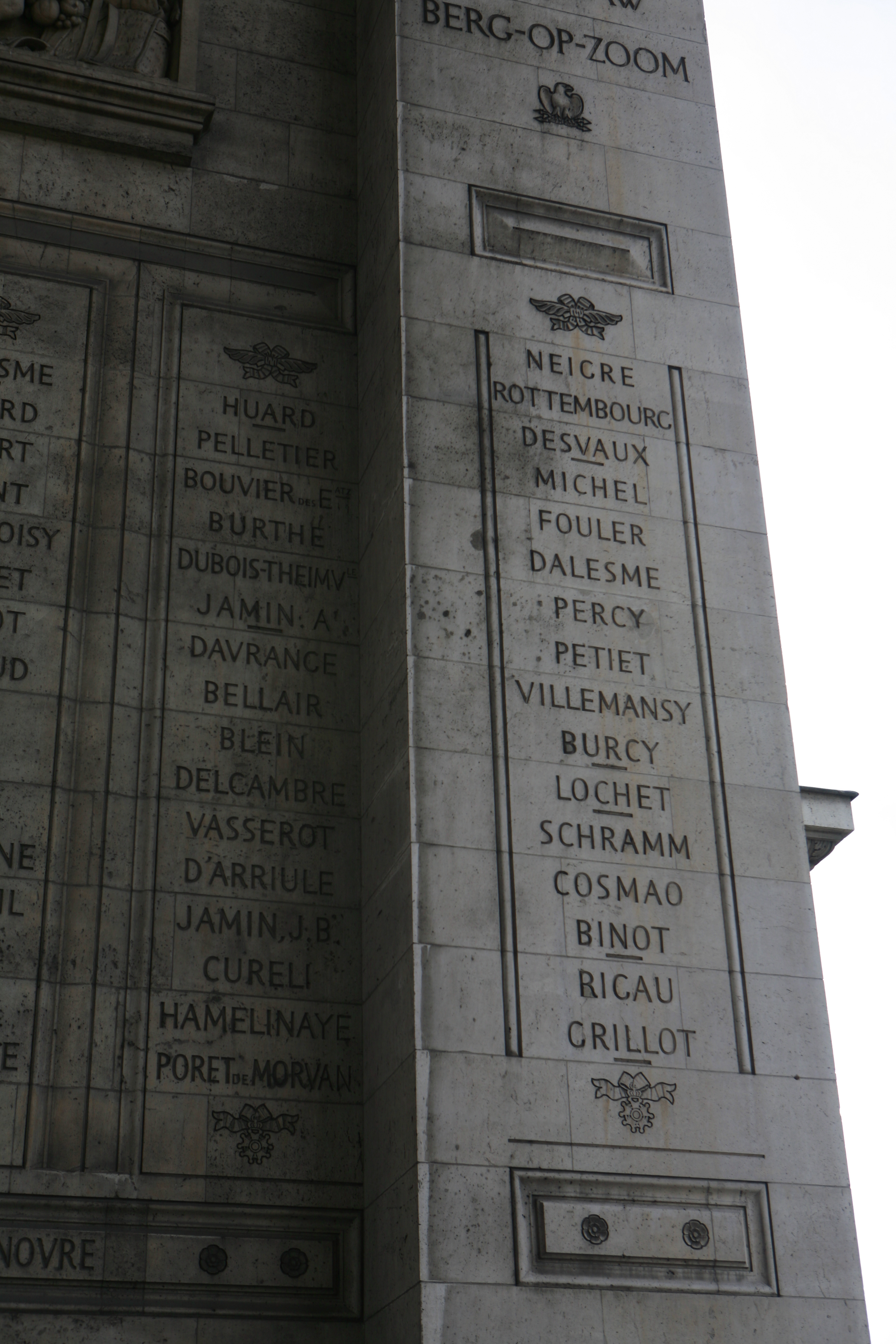
Huard's name on the Arc de triomphe

Léonard Jean Aubry Huard de Saint-Aubin (French pronunciation: [le.ɔnaʁ ʒɑ̃ obʁi ɥaʁ də sɛ̃ obɛ̃]; January 11, 1770 - September 7, 1812) was a French general of the First French Empire during the Napoleonic Wars. He was born in the department of Manche in Normandy. He started his military service in 1792. He was promoted to general de brigade (brigadier general) in 1807. He was killed in action at the Battle of Borodino at the age of 42.
