= François-Étienne de Damas =

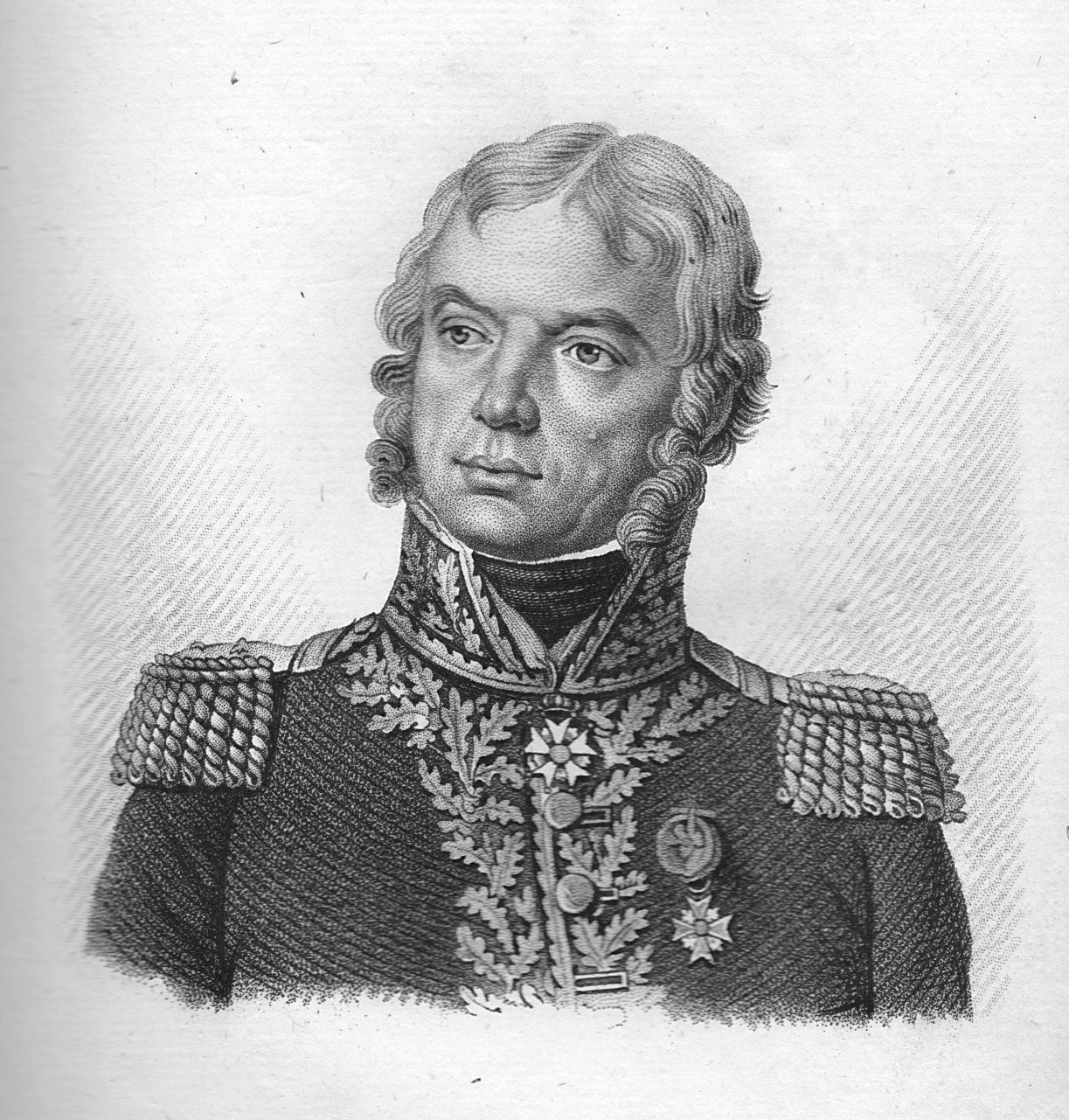
François-Étienne de Damas, an 1818 engraving

François-Étienne de Damas (French pronunciation: [fʁɑ̃swa etjɛn də damɑ]; 22 June 1764 - 23 December 1828) was a French general.

== Life ==
Damas was born in Paris. Destined by his family for a career in architecture, instead he joined the National Guard on 14 July 1789 and served in the camp sous Paris in 1792. Damas's mathematical knowledge led général Meusnier of the engineers to choose him as his aide-de-camp on coming to take command of Paris. Damas went with Meusnier when Meusnier moved to the armée du Rhin, which was commanded by Custine. He was in Mainz when it was besieged in 1793 and found himself close to Meusnier when Meusnier was mortally wounded crossing the Main.

Damas was then made an adjudant-général, then chef d'état-major under Jean-Baptiste Kléber and finally général de brigade on 6 December. He distinguished himself in the crossing of the River Rhine, during which he took an Austrian position at bayonet-point and was wounded in the leg by a bullet just as, in the words of Jean-Baptiste Jourdan, he was showing the army the path to victory. He was also noted for his conduct at the assault on Alexandria, the capture of Rosetta, the battle at Chebreiss, the battle of the Pyramids and the battle at Ghemélié, all during the French invasion of Egypt. He also took part in the destruction of the Mameluk camp before El-Arichet and caught the plague in Jaffa. He then rose to général de division and commanded part of Upper Egypt after Kléber's death.

After the battle unwisely begun by Jacques-François Menou, general Damas was ill-treated in the reports back to Paris and disgraced by Napoleon Bonaparte. Damas left the army and was jobless for five years. He was implicated in the trial of Jean Victor Marie Moreau and only freed at the request of Joachim Murat. When Murat became Grand Duke of Berg in 1806, he made Damas his secretary of state and military commander. He fought in the French invasion of Russia, distinguishing himself at the battle of Berezina. His brother, General François Auguste Damas, was killed in the same campaign. He then returned to the Duchy of Berg, then in 1815 to France with the title of inspector general of the infantry. The restored king Louis XVIII made him a colonel and commander of the Royal Guard de Paris (later known as the gendarmerie royale). He remained loyal to the king during the Hundred Days, during which he served as inspector general of infantry.

== Death ==
He held his posts from 1816 until his death in Paris in 1828.

== Sources ==
- (in French) Dictionnaire Bouillet
- Mullié, Charles (1852). "Damas (François-Étienne)" . Biographie des célébrités militaires des armées de terre et de mer de 1789 à 1850 (in French). Paris: Poignavant et Compagnie.
