= François Auguste Damas =

French brigade general

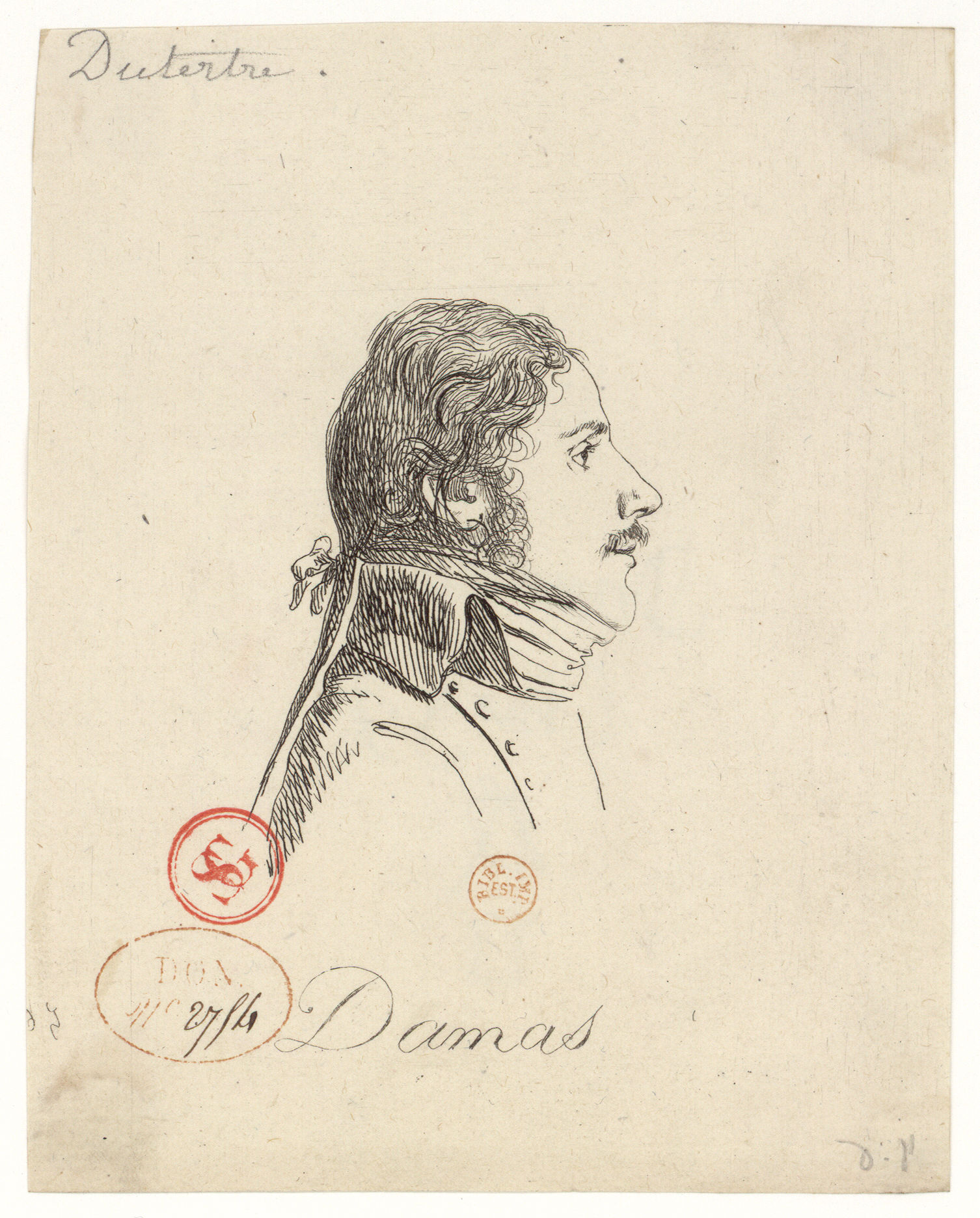
- Portrait by André Dutertre, 1798–1801.
- Born: 2 October 1773; Paris, France
- Died: 7 September 1812 (aged 38) Borodino, Russia
- Allegiance: Kingdom of France; First French Republic; First French Empire (Netherlands) Kingdom of Holland; Kingdom of Westphalia
- Rank: General of brigade
- Conflicts: French Revolutionary Wars; Napoleonic Wars; Battle of Borodino †

François Auguste Damas (French pronunciation: [fʁɑ̃swa oɡyst damɑ]; 2 October 1773 – 7 September 1812) was a French general of brigade during the Napoleonic Wars.

Damas entered military service in 1789 and served in the cavalry, infantry and on numerous staffs. He accompanied General Jean-Baptiste Kleber during the campaign in Egypt and Syria. In 1806 he entered the service of the Napoleonic Kingdom of Holland and became a brigadier in the next year. In 1811 he was taken into Westphalian service as a general de brigade. He accordingly served as brigade commander in the VIII Corps during the Invasion of Russia and was killed in the Battle of Borodino. He was the brother of General François-Étienne de Damas.

== See also ==
- List of French generals of the Revolutionary and Napoleonic Wars
