= Oleg Sokolov =

Russian historian and convicted murderer (1956)

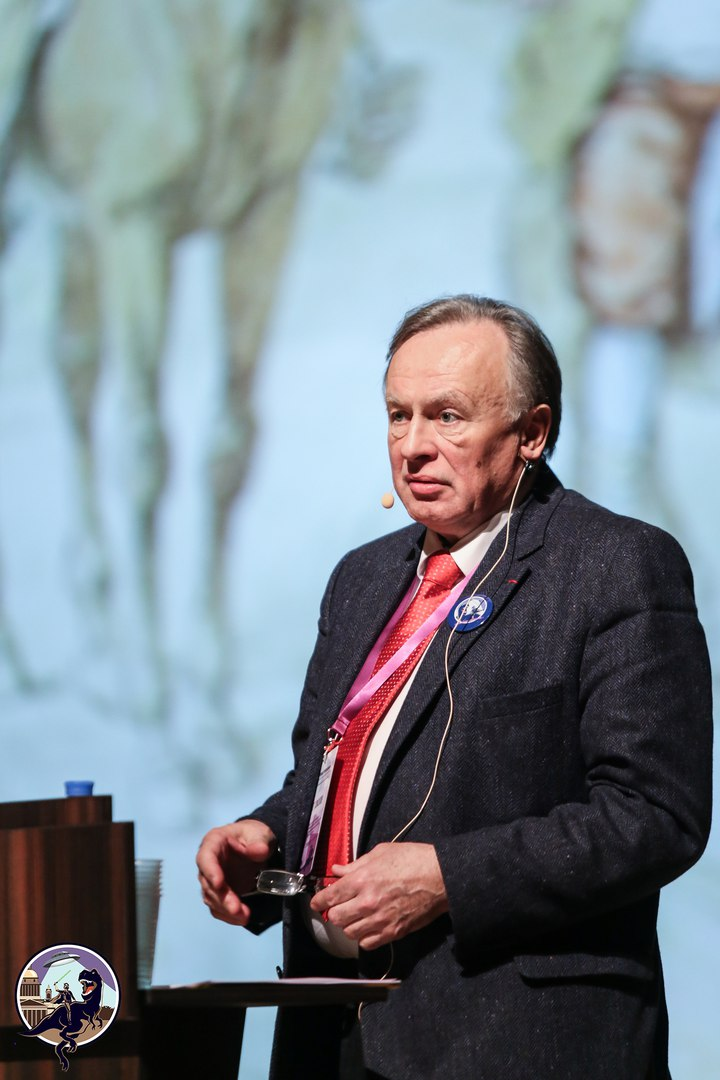
- Sokolov speaking at the 2018 Scientists Against Myths forum in Saint Petersburg
- Born: 9 July 1956 (age 70); Leningrad, Russian SFSR, USSR
- Education: Leningrad Polytechnic Institute; Leningrad State University
- Known for: Napoleonic historian, murderer
- Awards: Legion of Honour (Chevalier) (The procedure for the withdrawal of the award was initiated)
- Scientific career
- Fields: French history
- Workplaces: Saint Petersburg State University
- Thesis: The Officer Corps of the French Army Under the Ancien Régime and During the Revolution of 1789–1799 (1991)
- Doctoral advisor: Vladimir Revunenkov

Oleg Valeryevich Sokolov (Russian: Оле́г Вале́рьевич Соколо́в; born 9 July 1956) is a Russian convicted murderer and former historian who specialized in the Napoleonic era. In November 2019, he murdered, then subsequently dismembered and decapitated his 24-year-old mistress and former student Anastasia Yeshchenko. In December 2020, he was found guilty of intentional murder and sentenced to 12.5 years in high-security prison. He was an associate professor (docent) in history at Saint Petersburg State University until his dismissal.

== Biography ==
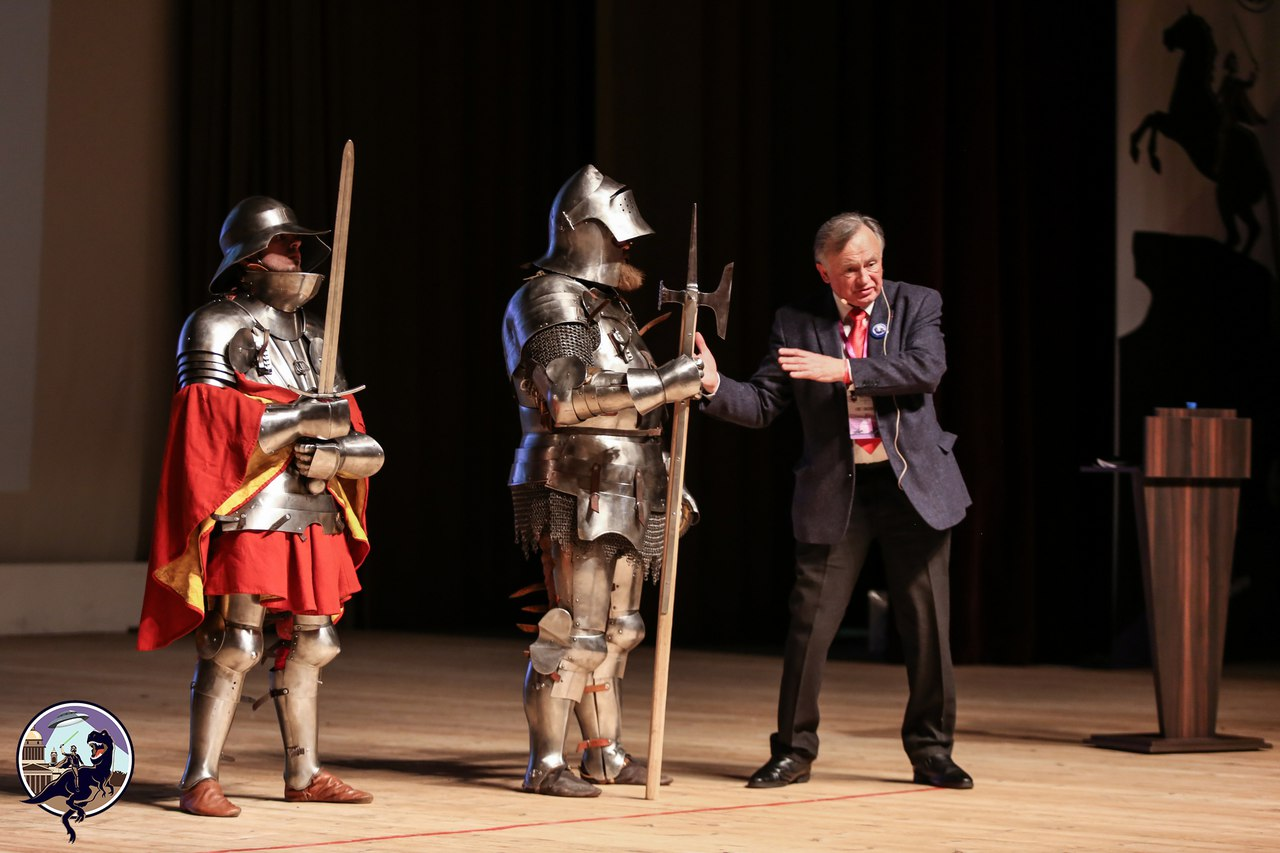
Sokolov and historical reenactors in armor of medieval knights at the 6th scientific and educational forum Scientists Against Myths in Saint Petersburg, 2018

Oleg Sokolov was born on 9 July 1956 in Leningrad (present-day Saint Petersburg), Russian SFSR, Soviet Union.

In 1979, he graduated with a specialist degree in physics and engineering from the Faculty of Physics and Mechanics of the Leningrad Polytechnic Institute.

In 1984, he graduated with honors from the Department of Modern and Contemporary History, Faculty of History of Leningrad State University.

In 1991, under the supervision of Professor Vladimir Revunenkov, a Doctor of Historical Sciences, he defended his dissertation at St. Petersburg State University for the degree of Candidate of Historical Sciences on the topic of The Officer Corps of the French Army Under the Ancien Régime and During the Revolution of 1789–1799 (speciality 07.00.03 – general history). The official opponents were Professor David Pritzker, a Doctor of Historical Sciences, and researcher at the Leningrad Branch of the Institute of History of the USSR Sergey Iskyul, a Candidate of Historical Sciences. The external review was conducted by the Herzen State Pedagogical University of Russia.

Since 2000, he had been an associate professor of the Department of Modern History, Faculty of History of St. Petersburg State University.

He is the author of a number of works on the military history of Europe of the 17th–early 19th centuries. In 1999, he published a major study, Napoleon's Army, which was translated into French in 2003. In 2006, he published the two-volume monograph Austerlitz. Napoleon, Russia and Europe, 1799–1805, a study of the premises and course of Napoleon's first war against the anti-French coalition. He translated into Russian and supplemented with extensive commentary Memoirs of the Napoleonic Wars 1802–1815 (French: Souvenirs militaires d'Octave Levavasseur : officer d'artillerie, aide de camp du Maréchal Ney (1802–1815)) by French officer Octave Levavasseur, who took part in all military campaigns (except for the Russian campaign of 1812) by Napoleon Bonaparte.

He was a prominent figure in Russian historical reenactment. In 1976, he founded the first reenactment group of the Napoleonic era. In February 1989, the Federation of Military History Clubs of the USSR was created and Sokolov became its president. In subsequent years, Sokolov continued to lead the association of clubs involved in reenactment (Military-Historical Association of Russia (1996), All-Russian Military-Historical Social Movement (2006)).

He became a chevalier of the Legion of Honour in 2003.

== Arrest for murder and sentence ==
On 9 November 2019, Sokolov was detained on suspicion of the murder of Anastasia Yeshchenko, his 24-year-old lover, his graduate student at St. Petersburg State University and his co-author of scholarly works. There is an ongoing investigation by the Investigative Committee of Russia. On 11 November, Sokolov was charged with wilful murder (article 105 of the Criminal Code) and was arrested for two months until 8 January 2020 with the detention in the Kresty Prison. On 13 November, his defense lawyer said that Sokolov had given full testimony on the case (he had previously refused to do so, referring to the 51st article (Note: «1. No one shall be obliged to give evidence incriminating themselves, a husband or wife or close relatives the range of whom is determined by federal law.») of the Constitution of the Russian Federation).

According to the investigation, Sokolov was found in the Moyka River in Saint Petersburg with a backpack containing the woman's arms and a weapon. Local media claims he was drunk and fell into the river as he tried to dispose of the body parts. Police found more body parts in his home, but the package with the victim's torso was not retrieved from the river until 11 November. He has admitted guilt and was willing to cooperate in the investigation. According to Sokolov's defense lawyer, his client filed a confession, but the defense team did not intend to exclude the version of self-incrimination. In addition, his lawyer noted that Sokolov was assigned a psychiatric examination. As Sokolov himself stated during a meeting of the Oktyabrsky District Court of St. Petersburg, the crime was committed on the basis of a personal conflict, because, according to him, Yeshchenko had “recently a terrible reaction to my children” and “she started to freak at their mention” and then they both “lost control” during a quarrel and then “she attacked me with a knife”. During the trial, a video recording made by Sokolov on the day of the murder was published, which recorded a quarrel with Anastasia, who, under great stress, ran out into the cold without outerwear.

On September 23, 2020, during the announcement of the results of the forensic examination in court, the state prosecutor stated that Anastasia Yeshchenko died from a gunshot to the head from a close range. She was shot four times in total, and before that she was strangled, causing non-fatal injuries. According to the conclusion of forensic experts, before her death, Anastasia Yeshchenko was strangled by the neck from both sides. Despite the fractures of the hyoid bone and laryngeal cartilages caused by this strangulation, the cause of her death was a gunshot wound to the head with 5.6 mm lead bullets. She was shot four times, all shots were made in the head, one of the bullets hit the victim in the eye, but by that time Anastasia was already dead from the first shot. Three bullets went through, one remained in the skull.

He is said to have planned to get rid of the body before publicly committing suicide dressed as Napoleon at the Peter and Paul Fortress.

The representative of the Investigative Committee also promised to verify Sokolov's involvement in the beating of another woman. In 2018, the Moskovskij Komsomolets newspaper published an article in which Sokolov's student accused the lecturer of brutal beating in 2008.

Soon after reports of his detention, the Russian Military Historical Society (RMHS), chaired by Minister of Culture Vladimir Medinsky, removed from its website all mention of Oleg Sokolov, who formerly was a member of its scientific council, and the adviser to the RMHS chairman announced that she had heard his name for the first time. French Institute of Social Science, Economics and Politics (ISSEP), founded by Marion Maréchal, the niece of Marine Le Pen, had removed him from his position on its scientific committee on Saturday (9 November).

He was subsequently dismissed from his post at Saint Petersburg State University.

On 25 December 2020, Sokolov was sentenced to twelve years and a half in jail after being convicted of the murder.

== Works ==
Oleg Sokolov is the author of five monographs and over 300 articles on the history of the Napoleonic Wars.

=== Monographs ===
in Russian

- Sokolov, O. V. (1999). Армия Наполеона [Napoleon's Army] (PDF) (in Russian). Saint Petersburg: Imperiya. ISBN 5-93914-001-7.
- Sokolov, O. V. (2006). Аустерлиц. Наполеон, Россия и Европа, 1799—1805 гг. [Austerlitz. Napoleon, Russia and Europe, 1799–1805] (PDF) (in Russian). Vol. I. Moscow: Russkiy Impuls. ISBN 5-90252521-7.
- Sokolov, O. V. (2006). Аустерлиц. Наполеон, Россия и Европа, 1799—1805 гг. [Austerlitz. Napoleon, Russia and Europe, 1799–1805] (PDF) (in Russian). Vol. II. Moscow: Russkiy Impuls. ISBN 5-90252522-5.
- Sokolov, O. V. (2012). Битва двух империй. 1805—1812 [Battle of Two Empires. 1805–1812] (in Russian). Moscow: Astrel. ISBN 978-5-271-42347-5.
- Sokolov, O. V., ed. (2012). Наполеон Бонапарт: pro et contra (Образ Наполеона Бонапарта в культурной памяти об Отечественной войне 1812 года) [Napoleon Bonaparte: Pro et Contra (The Image of Napoleon Bonaparte in the Cultural Memory of the Patriotic War of 1812)] (PDF) (Anthology). Russkiy put (in Russian). Saint Petersburg: Russian Christian Academy for the Humanities Press. ISBN 978-5-88812-517-5.
- Vozgrin, V. E.; Goncharova, T. N.; Plenkov, O. Y.; Sokolov, O. V. (2014). Smolin, A. V. (ed.). Из истории конституционного строительства в Западной Европе в Новое и новейшее время [From the History of Constitution-Building in Western Europe in Modern Era] (PDF) (in Russian). Saint Petersburg: Russian Christian Academy for the Humanities Press. ISBN 978-5-88812-664-6.
- Baryshnikov, V. N.; Vozgrin, V. E.; Goncharova, T. N.; Evdokimova, N. P.; Klimova, G. S.; Sidorenko, L. V.; Sokolov, O. V.; Plenkov, O. Y.; Fokin, V. I. (2016). Smolin, A. V. (ed.). От национальных государств к единой Европе: проблемы европейской интеграции в XIX—XXI вв. [From Nation-States to the European Unity: Issues of European Integration in the 19–21st Centuries] (PDF) (in Russian). Saint Petersburg: Russian Christian Academy for the Humanities Press. ISBN 978-5-88812-792-6.
- Sokolov, O. V. (2016). Первая Итальянская кампания Бонапарта 1796—1797. Часть I. Битва за Пьемонт. [Bonaparte's First Italian Campaign of 1796–1797. Part I. The Battle of Piedmont]. Polya srazheniy napoleonovskoy epokhi (in Russian). Saint Petersburg: Kordegardiya. ISBN 978-5-4465-1065-8. Archived from the original on 11 November 2019.
- Sokolov, O. V. (2018). Стратегия и тактика Наполеоновской армии [Strategy and Tactics of the Napoleonic Army] (PDF) (in Russian). Moscow: Synergy University. ISBN 978-5-4257-0372-9.
- Sokolov, O. V. (2019). Битва трёх императоров. Наполеон, Россия и Европа. 1799—1805 гг. [The Battle of the Three Emperors. Napoleon, Russia and Europe. 1799–1805]. Razvedopros (in Russian). Saint Petersburg: Piter. ISBN 978-5-4461-1047-6.

in French

- Sokolov, O. (2003). L'Armée de Napoléon. Paris: Commios.
- Sokolov, O. (2006). Austerlitz. Napoléon, l'Europe et la Russie (PDF). Paris: Commios.
- Sokolov, O. (2012). Le Combat de deux empires. La Russie d'Alexandre I^{er} contre la France de Napoléon, 1805–1812. Paris: Fayard. Archived from the original on 10 November 2019.

in Polish

- Sokołow, O. (2014). Armia Napoleona. Oświęcim: Napoleon V.
- Sokołow, O. (2014). Austerlitz Śmiertelne zmagania Francji z Europą i Rosją. Oświęcim: Napoleon V.
- Sokołow, O. (2016). Napoleon, Aleksander i Europa 1806–1812. Oświęcim: Napoleon V.

=== Articles ===
in Russian

- Соколов О. В. Высшие офицеры французской армии и революционное правительство в 1792—1794 гг Archived 16 May 2021 at the Wayback Machine. // От Старого порядка к Революции / под ред. проф. В. Г. Ревуненкова. — Л., 1988.
- Соколов О. В. Ульмская операция 1805 года // Орел. — 1993. — № 1, 2, 3.
- Соколов О. В. Офицеры короля // Империя истории. — 2001. — № 1.
- Соколов О. В. Генерал Антуан-Анри Жомини и его роль в развитии российской военной науки // Швейцарцы в Петербурге. — СПб, 2002.
- Соколов О. В. Испания в огне. Сомо-Сьерра // Империя истории. — 2002. — № 2.
- Соколов О. В. Рыцарство как элита средневекового общества // Империя истории. — 2002. — № 2.
- Соколов О. В. Час отваги и мужества. Битва при Никополе // Империя истории. — 2002. — № 2.
- Соколов О. В. Испания в огне. Погоня за Муром // Империя истории. — 2002. — № 3.
- Соколов О. В. Дух армии Наполеона // Империя истории. — 2002. — № 3.
- Соколов О. В. Французская армия и переворот 18 брюмера // Наполеон. Легенда и реальность. Материалы научных конференций и наполеоновских чтений. 1996—1998 / Сост. А. Васильев, Г. Л. Медынцева. — СПб.: Минувшее, 2003. — 444 с. — 500 экз. — ISBN 5-902073-16-2.
- Соколов О. В. Начало Польской кампании или должны ли французы умирать за Польшу? // Империя истории. — 2006. — № 4.
- Соколов О. В. Рокруа — триумф юной отваги // Империя истории. — 2006. — № 4.
- Соколов О. В. Записки генерала В. И. Левенштерна", Подготовка текста, вступительная статья и комментарии // Труды кафедры истории Нового и новейшего времени. 2013. № 10 / Сост. Т. Н. Гончарова. — СПб, 2013. — С. 120—150
- Соколов О. В. Поляки на службе Наполеона в сражении на Березине, 28 ноября 1812 г. // Desperta Ferro (Madrid), 2013 г.
- Соколов О. В. Русско-французские отношения накануне войны 1805 г. // Труды кафедры истории Нового и новейшего времени. 2013. № 11. / Сост. Т. Н. Гончарова. — СПб., 2013. С. 67—84
- Соколов О. В. Вступление // к монографии А. Королёва: «По следам Великой армии Наполеона»
- Соколов О. В. Военно-политическая обстановка во время подписания Тильзитского мира и реакция на договор в свете синхронных источников // Вестник СПбГУ. Серия 2. — 2015. — Выпуск 1. — С. 35—46
- Соколов О. В. Итальянская армия Бонапарта накануне похода 1796 г. // Труды кафедры Новой и Новейшей истории. — 2015. — № 15. — С. 50—67

in French

- Sokolov O. V. Le regiment Pavlovski en 1811 // Tradition Magazine. № 52, 1991.
- Sokolov O. V. La campagne de Russie. Les origines du conflit // Napoléon Ier. № 5, 2001.
- Sokolov O. V. La campagne de Russie. L’offensive de Napoléon, de Vilna a Witebsk // Napoléon Ier. № 6, 2001.
- Sokolov O. V. La campagne de Russie. La bataille de Smolensk // Napoleon Ier. № 7, 2001.
- Sokolov O. V. La campagne de Russie. La Moskowa // Napoléon Ier. № 8, 2001.
- Sokolov O. V. La campagne de Russie. De Moscou a Viazma // Napoléon Ier. № 9, 2001.
- Sokolov O. V. La campagne de Russie. Berezina // Napoléon Ier. № 10, 2001.
- Sokolov O. V. 1805 — Napoleon marche vers Austerlitz (1). Wertingen — Haslach — Elchingen // Revue de l'histoire napoléonienne. № 3, 2005.
- Sokolov O. V. 1805 — Napoleon marche vers Austerlitz (2). Amstetten — Durrenstein — Hollabrunn // Revue de l'histoire napoléonienne, № 6, 2006.
- Sokolov O. V. Austerlitz 1805. Le plan de Napoléon — la bataille d’Austerlitz — le bilan // Revue de l'histoire napoléonienne. № 27, 2009.
- Sokolov O. V. «Los Polacos en el Berezina» // Historia militar y política del mundo moderno, siglos XVI—XIX. Desperta Ferro, Madrid, 2014, № 8, р. 46—53.

=== Translations ===
- Levavasseur, Octave (2014). Воспоминания о наполеоновских войнах 1802—1815 [Memoirs of the Napoleonic Wars 1802–1815] (in Russian). Translated by Sokolov, O. V. Saint Petersburg: Eurasia. ISBN 978-5-906518-16-3.

=== Fiction ===
- Sokolov, O. V. (2015). Испанская война и тайна тамплиеров [The Spanish War and the Templars' Mystery]. Plashch i shpaga (in Russian). Saint Petersburg: AST. ISBN 978-5-17-087617-4. Archived from the original on 10 November 2019.
