= Auguste-Joseph Desarnod =

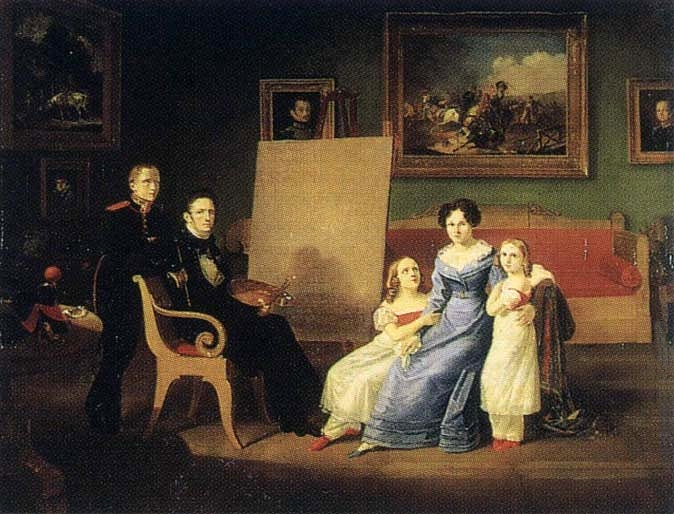
- The Artist and His Family
- Born: 1788; France
- Died: 15 April 1840 (aged 51–52); Saint Petersburg
- Education: Member Academy of Arts (1827)
- Known for: Painting

Auguste-Joseph Desarnod, or Desarnot (French: [oɡyst ʒozɛf dezɑʁno], Russian: Август Осипович Дезарно; 1788 in France – 15 April 1840, in Saint Petersburg) was a French-born engraver and battle painter who spent most of his life in Russia. He is sometimes referred to as "The Elder", to distinguish him from his son of the same name, who lived from 1812 to 1850, and was also a painter.

== Biography ==
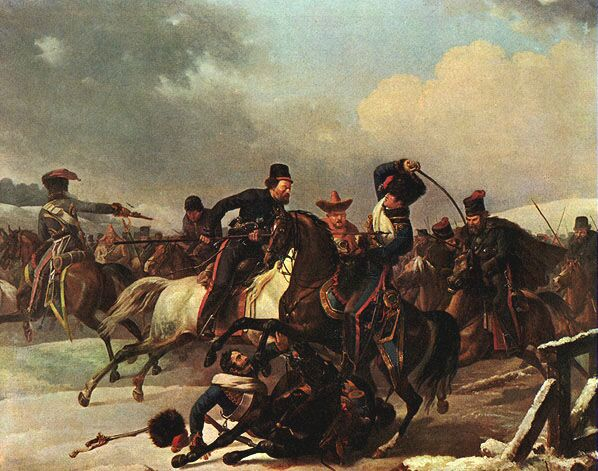
Cossacks pursuing the French at the Battle of Krasnoi. The figure being thrown from his horse in the foreground is Desarnod.

He received his first lessons in painting at the École des Beaux-Arts from Antoine-Jean Gros. In 1812, he enlisted as an officer in the Hussars, participated in the French invasion of Russia, and was captured by cossacks during the Battle of Krasnoi. After his release in 1814, he remained in Russia and became a citizen; having married a Russian woman.

In 1815, he presented some of his paintings at the Imperial Academy of Arts, depicting various activities of the Russian cavalry. One of them showed a horseman pursuing a French carabinier and, on the basis of this picture, he was elected to the Academy. Two years later, he presented more paintings with the hope of being named an "Academician", but the judges found these works to be unsatisfactory. In 1827, he was finally granted that title for a work depicting himself being captured.

In 1829, he accompanied the troops of Count Hans Karl von Diebitsch on their campaigns in the Russo-Turkish War. Upon his return in 1830, he was awarded the Order of Saint Vladimir. The drawings he made were turned into lithographs and, with the cooperation of the Tsar's librarian, they were published in France in 1834 by Firmin Didot Frères. The collection was called Album d’un voyage en Turquie fait par ordre de Sa Majesté l’Empereur en 1829 et 1830.

During his career, he received the patronage of Alexander I, Nikolai I and the Grand Duke Mikhail Pavolovich, and produced many paintings of the uniforms worn by the various guard regiments.
