= Serbs in Russia =

Сербы в России Срби у Русији Srbi u Rusiji

Total population
- 2,151 (2020) (Note: see Ethnic groups in Russia)

Regions with significant populations
- Moscow, Moscow Oblast, Stavropol Krai

Languages
- Russian and Serbian

Religion
- Eastern Orthodoxy

Related ethnic groups
- Serbs in Belarus, Serbs in Ukraine

Serbs in Russia are Russian citizens and residents of ethnic Serb descent or and/or Serbia-born persons living in Russia. According to the data from the 2020 census, there were 2,151 people that declared Serb ethnicity.

== History ==
=== Middle Ages ===
After the Ottoman invasion of Serbia in the 14th century, Serbian refugees found refuge in Russia. Lazar the Serb (built the first mechanical public clock in Russia) and Pachomius the Serb (hagiographer and translator) were some of the notable Serbs in Russian medieval history. Elena Glinskaya (1510–1538), the mother of Russian emperor Ivan the Terrible (r. 1547–84), was maternally Serbian. The veneration of Saint Sava was established in Russia in the 16th century.

=== Russian Empire ===
In the 1750s, in a re-settlement initiated by Austrian Colonel Ivan Horvat, a vast number of Orthodox Serbs, mostly from territories controlled by the Habsburg monarchy (the Serbian Grenzers), settled in Russia's military frontier region of New Serbia (with the centre in Novomirgorod, mainly in the territory of present-day Kirovohrad Oblast of Ukraine), as well as in Slavo-Serbia (now mainly the territory of the Luhansk Oblast of Ukraine). In 1764, both territorial entities were incorporated in Russia's Novorossiya Governorate. Serbs continued to settle in Russian lands, and many, such as Sava Vladislavich, Nikolay Depreradovich, and Peter Tekeli, became high ranking generals and imperial nobility. As of 1890, there were approximately 9,500 ethnic Serb citizens in the Russian Empire.

During the Napoleonic Wars, many Russian generals were either Serbian-born or of Serbian descent, including Georgi Emmanuel, Peter Ivelich, Nikolay Vuich, Ivan Shevich, and multiple others. The most esteemed Serb in the service of the Russian Empire at the time of the Napoleonic Wars was Count Mikhail Miloradovich, a leading commander during the French invasion of Russia and governor-general of Saint Petersburg.

Other prominent Serbs in the imperial era included Fedor Mirkovich, who served as Governor-General of Lithuania, Alexander Knyazhevich, who served as Minister of Finance, and Vasily Karazin, the founder of Imperial Kharkov University, which now bears his name.

=== Soviet Union ===
Throughout the existence of the Soviet Union, many Serbs in Russia continued to play prominent roles in society. Notable figures at the time include and renowned sculptor and Hero of Socialist Labour Yevgeny Vuchetich, who designed primarily The Motherland Calls, the largest statue in the world at the time of its construction.

== Notable people ==
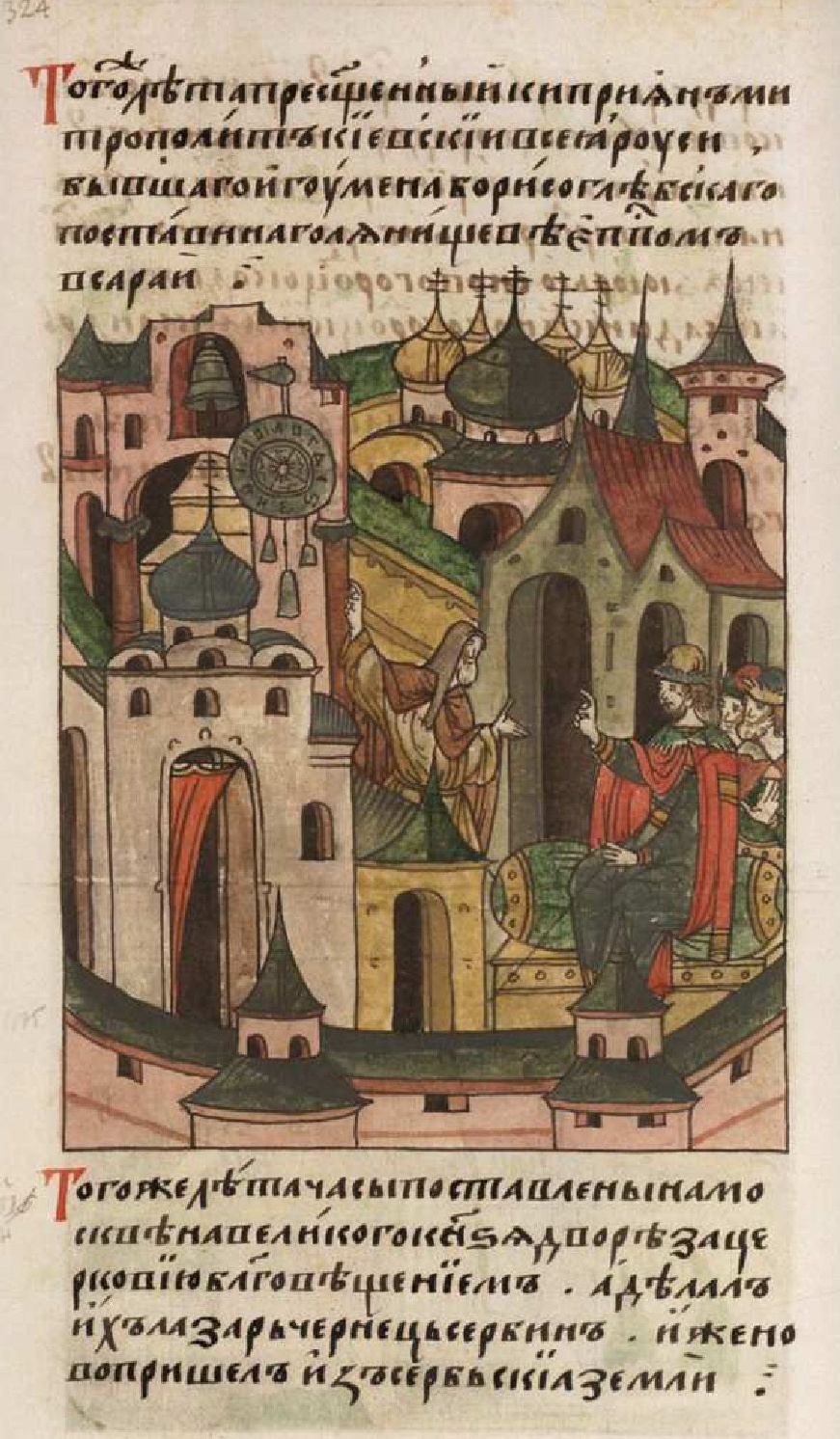
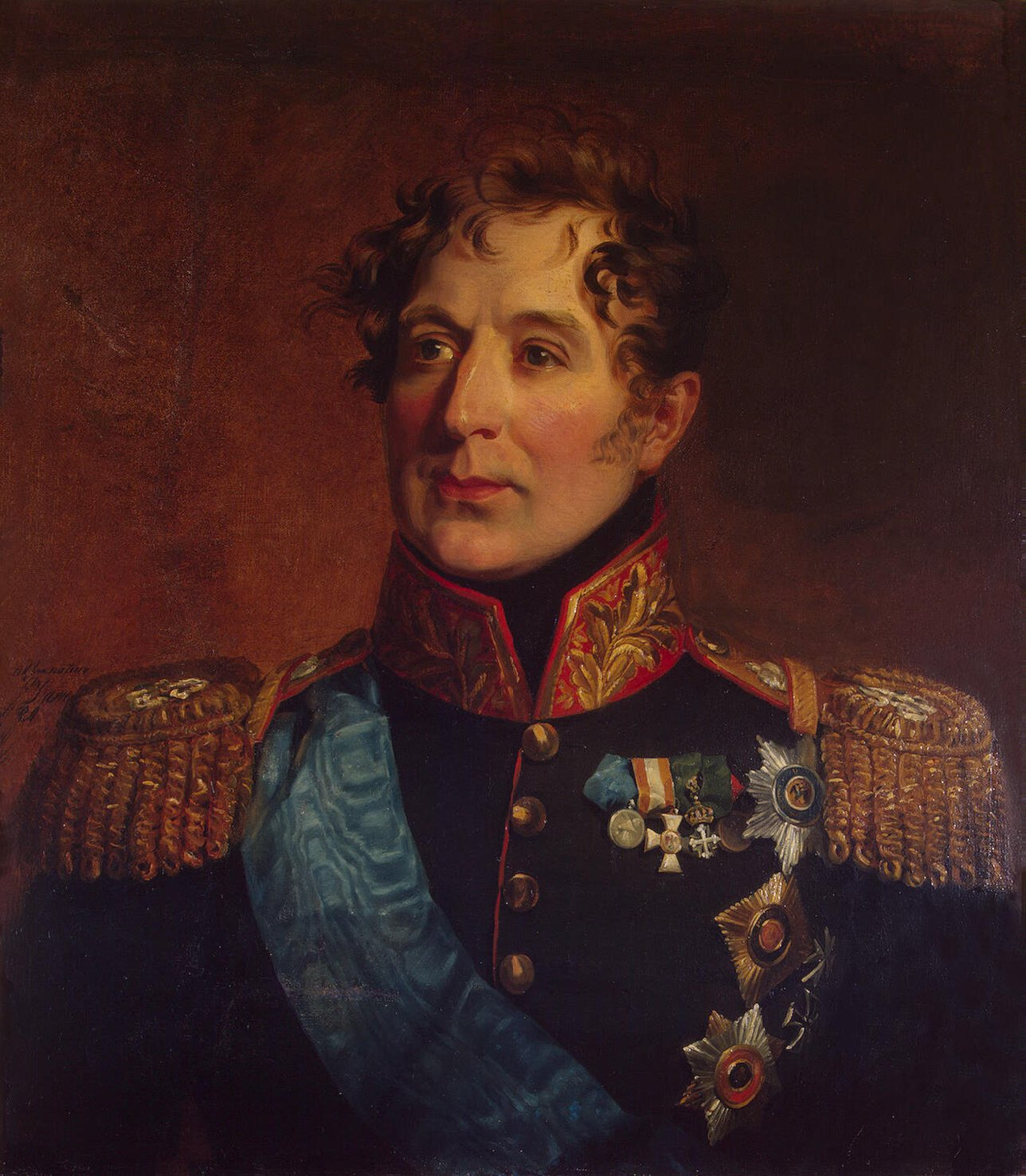
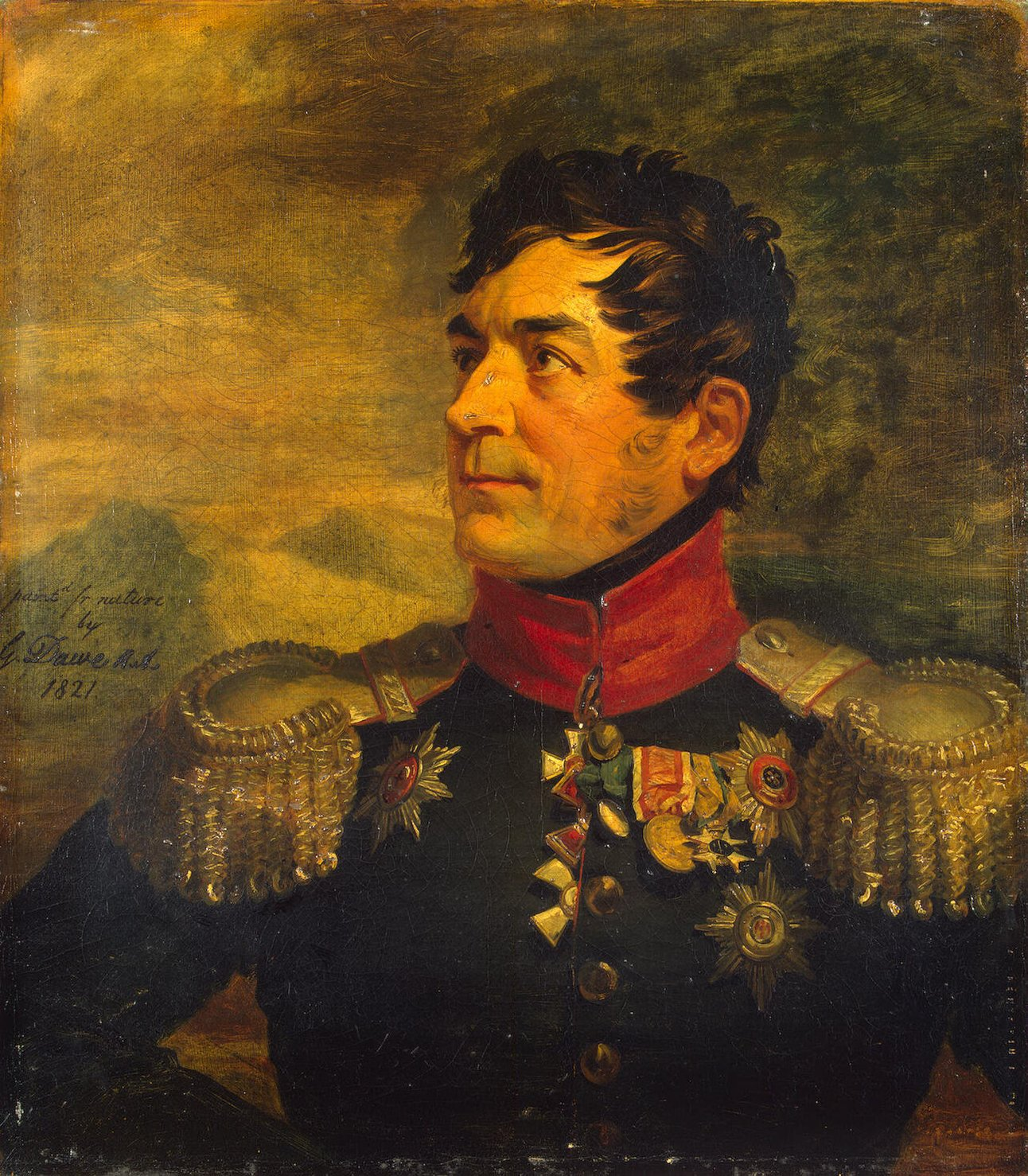
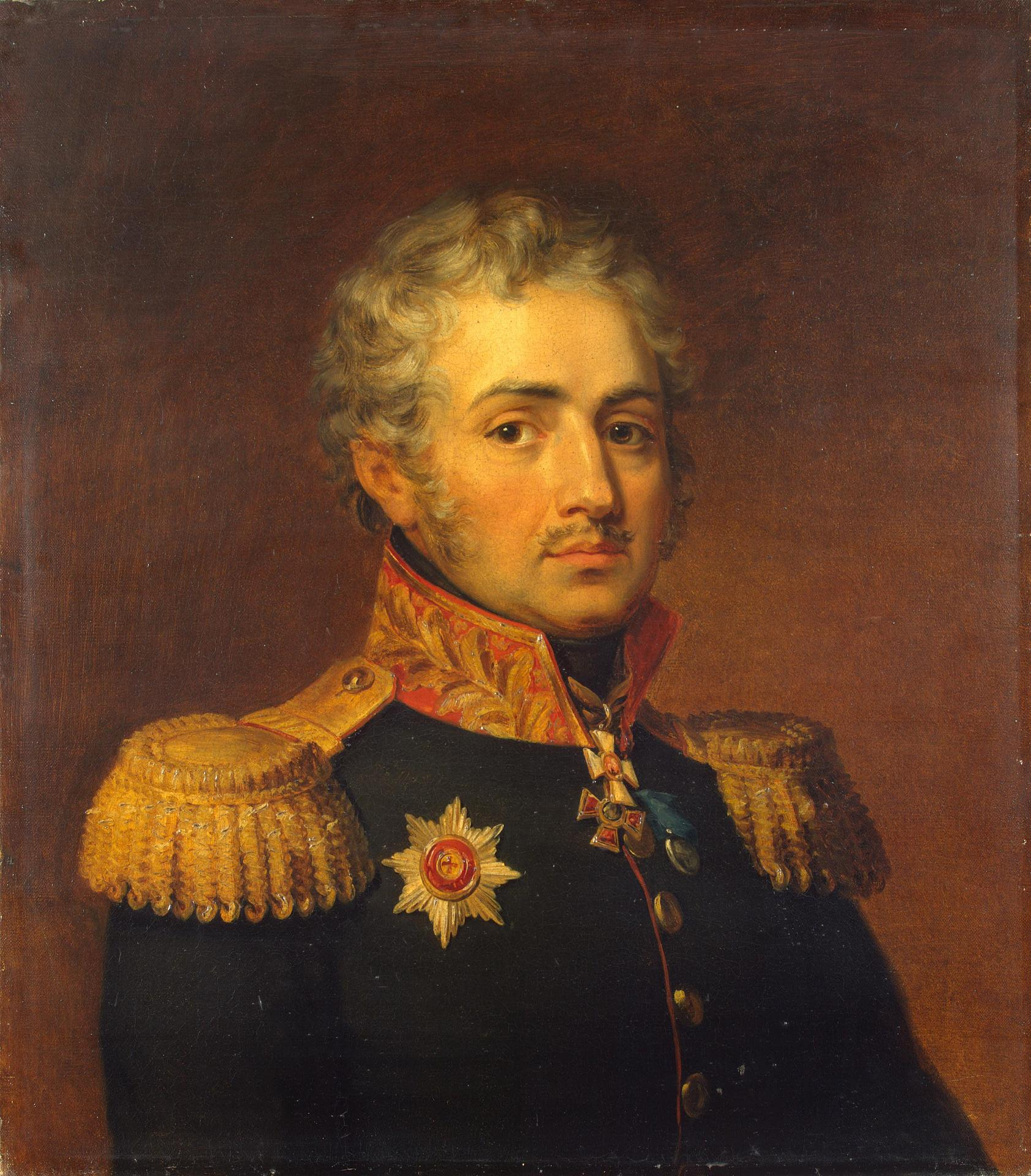
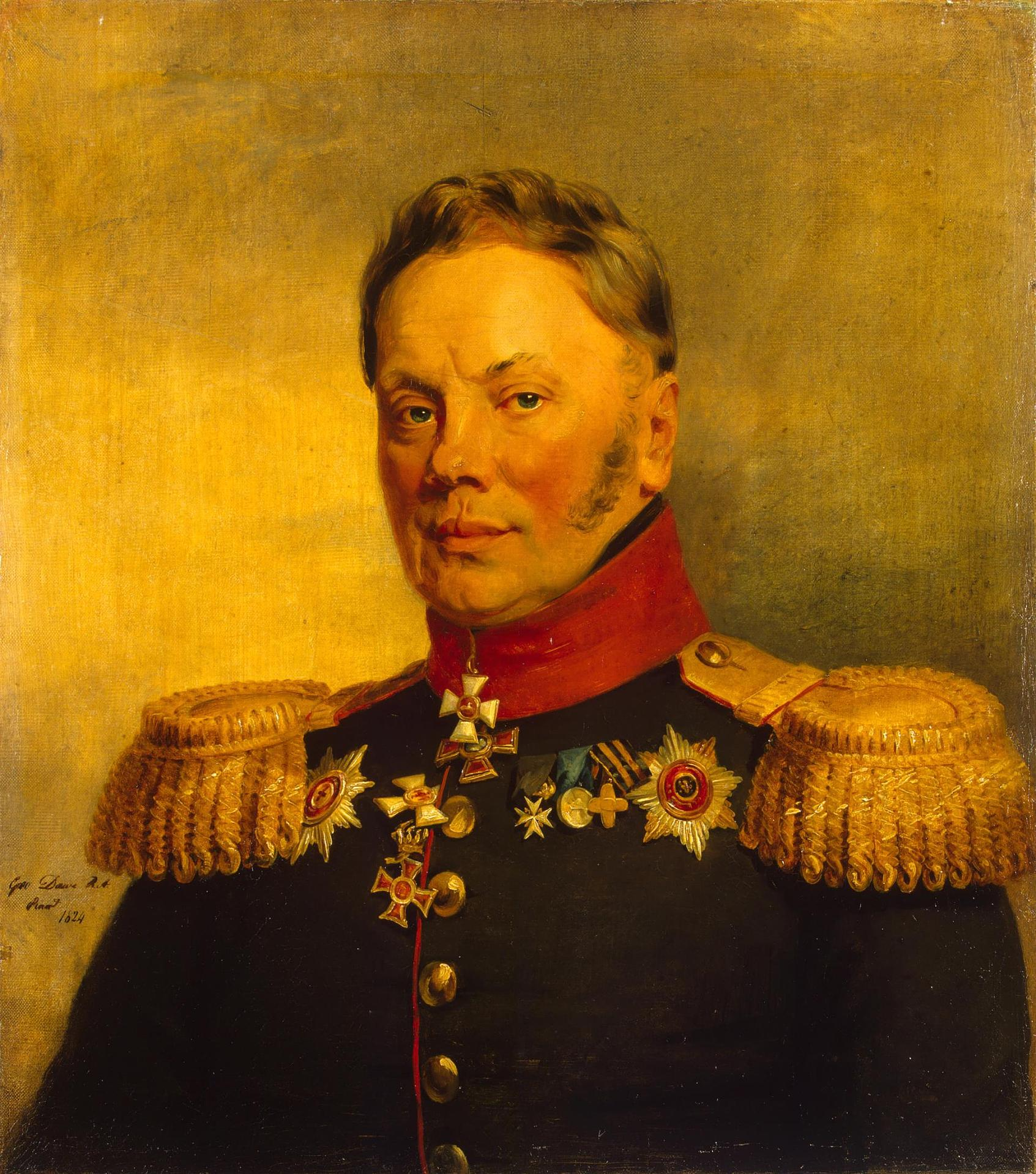
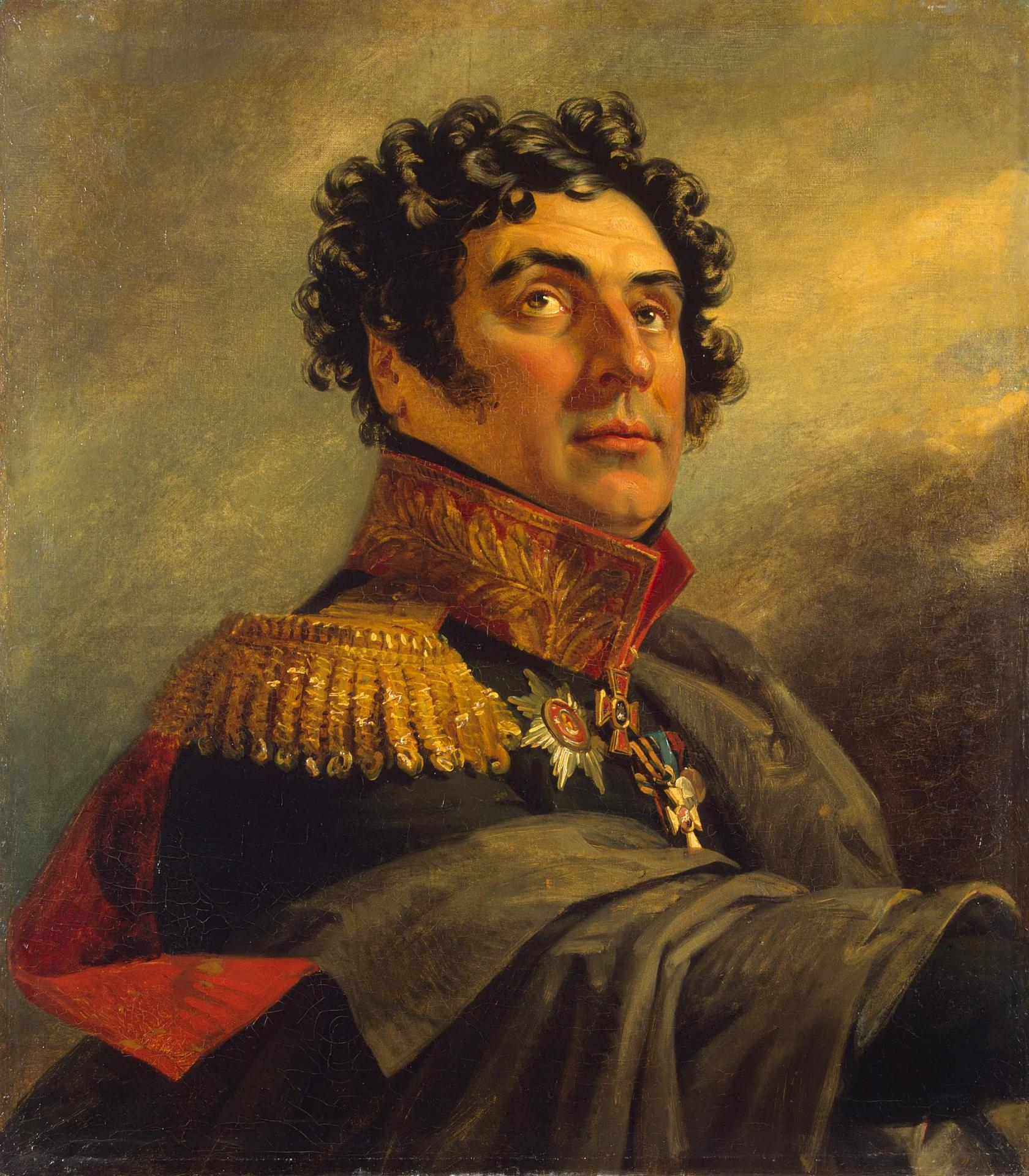
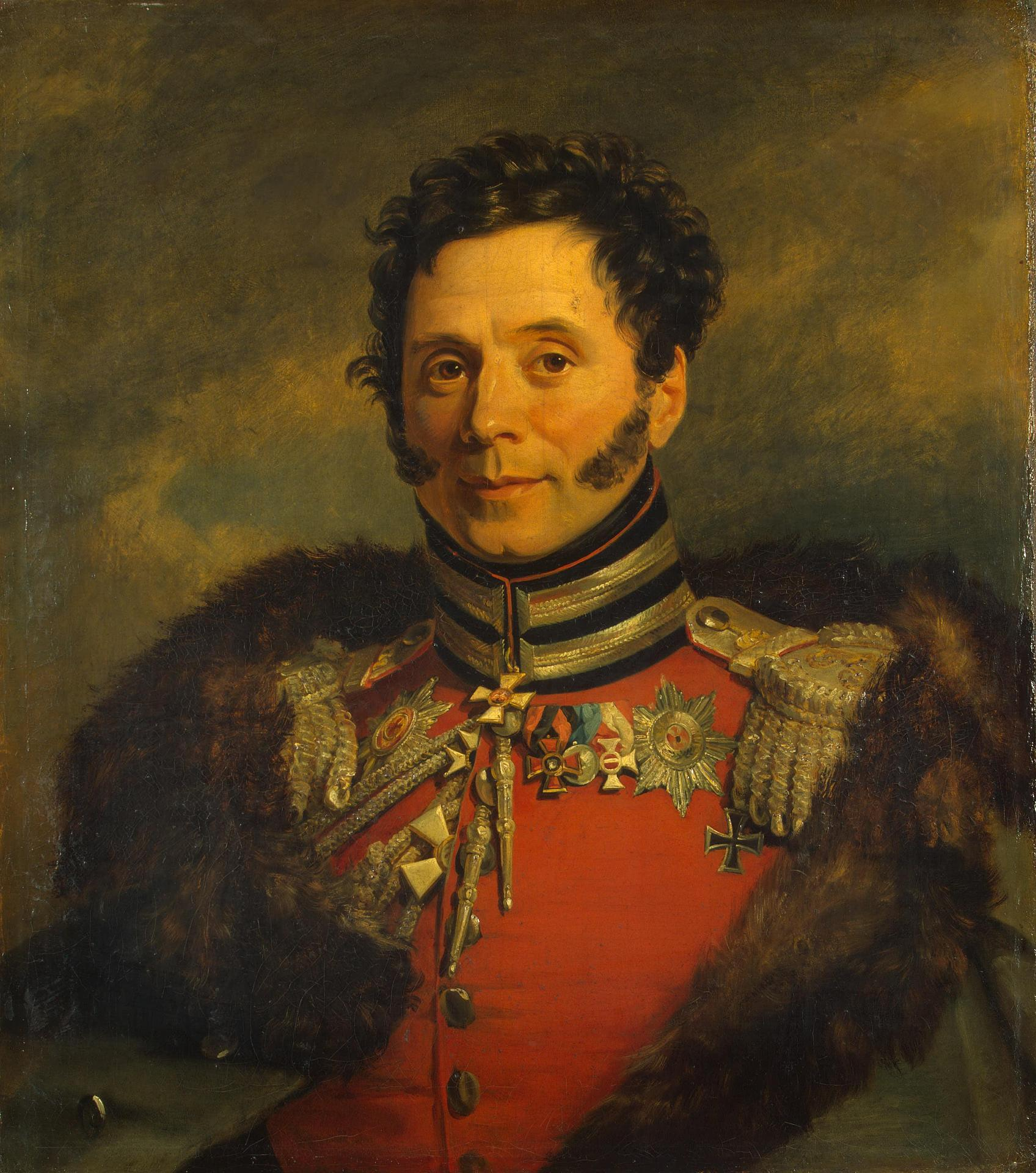
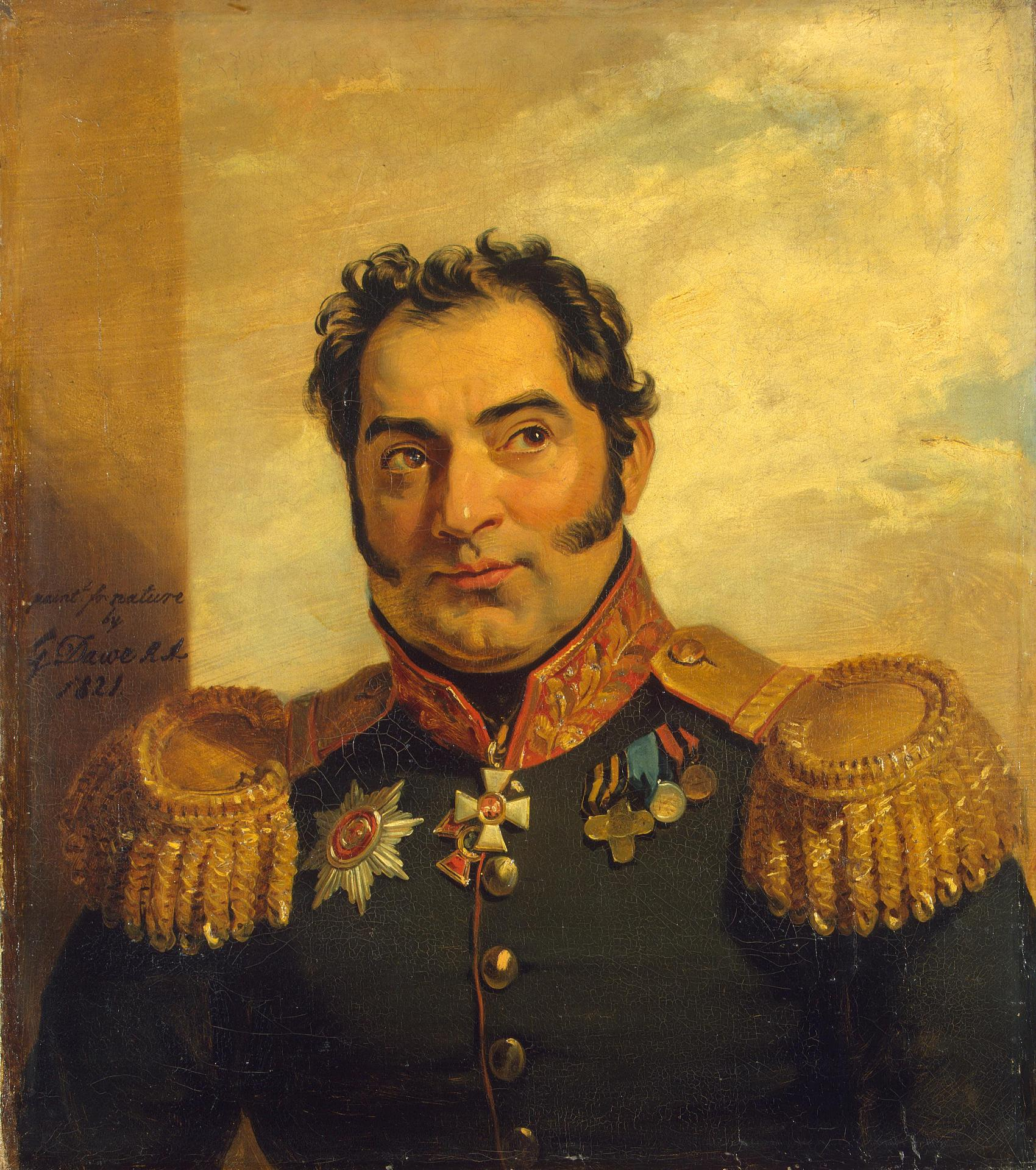
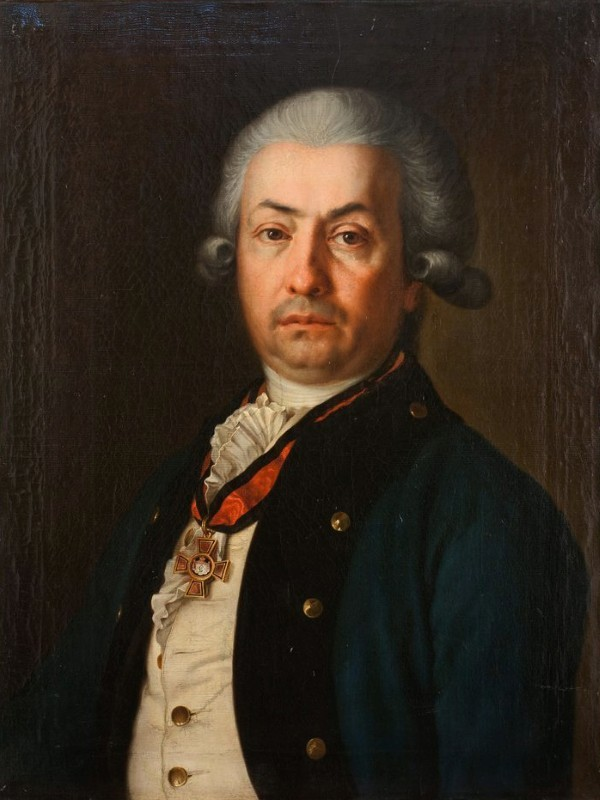
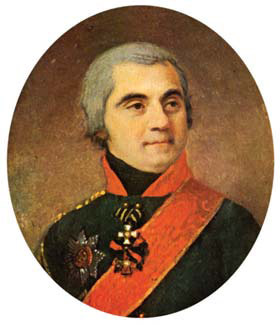
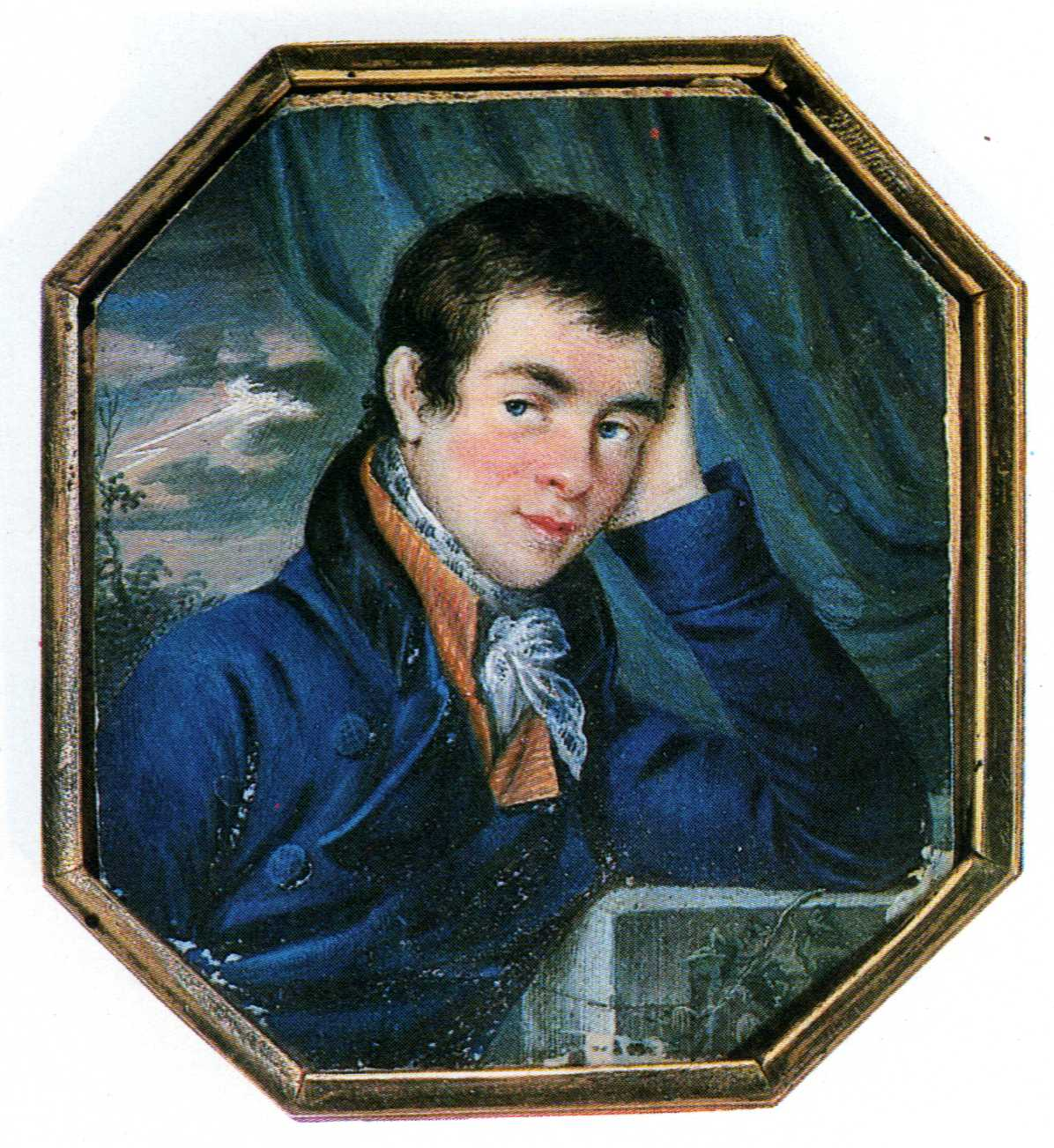
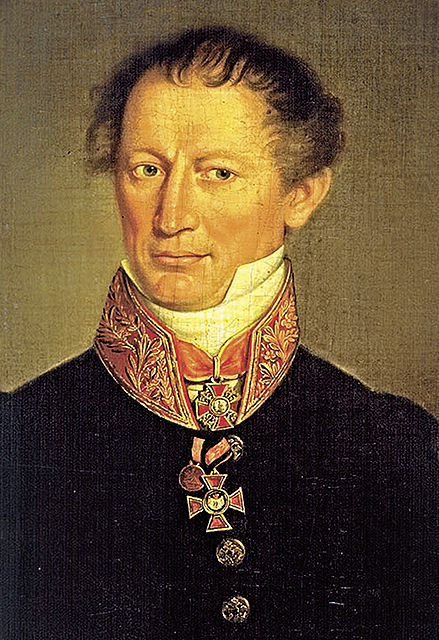
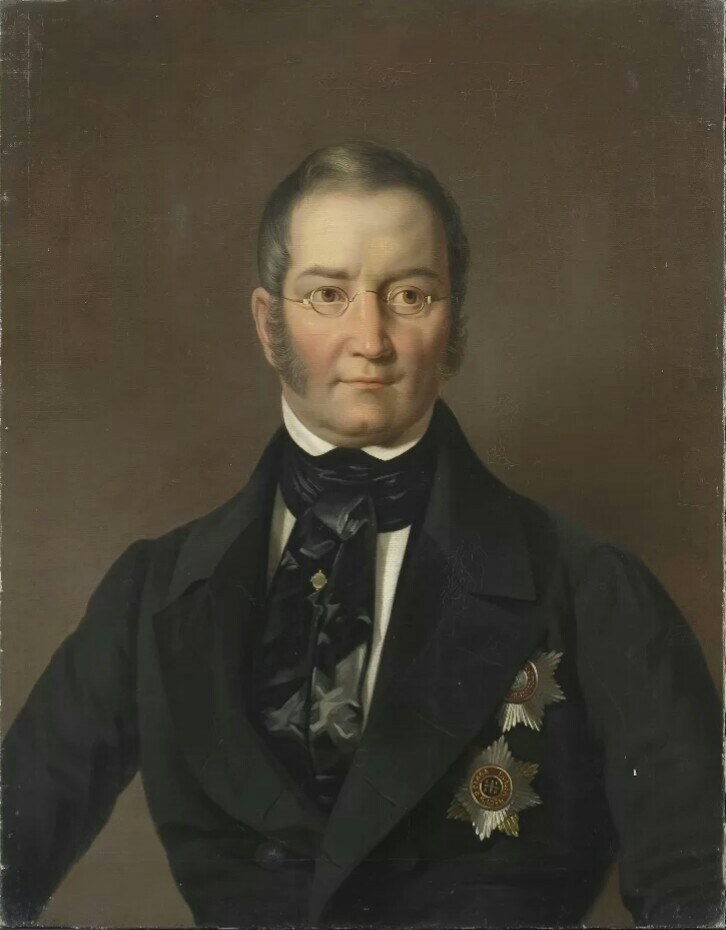
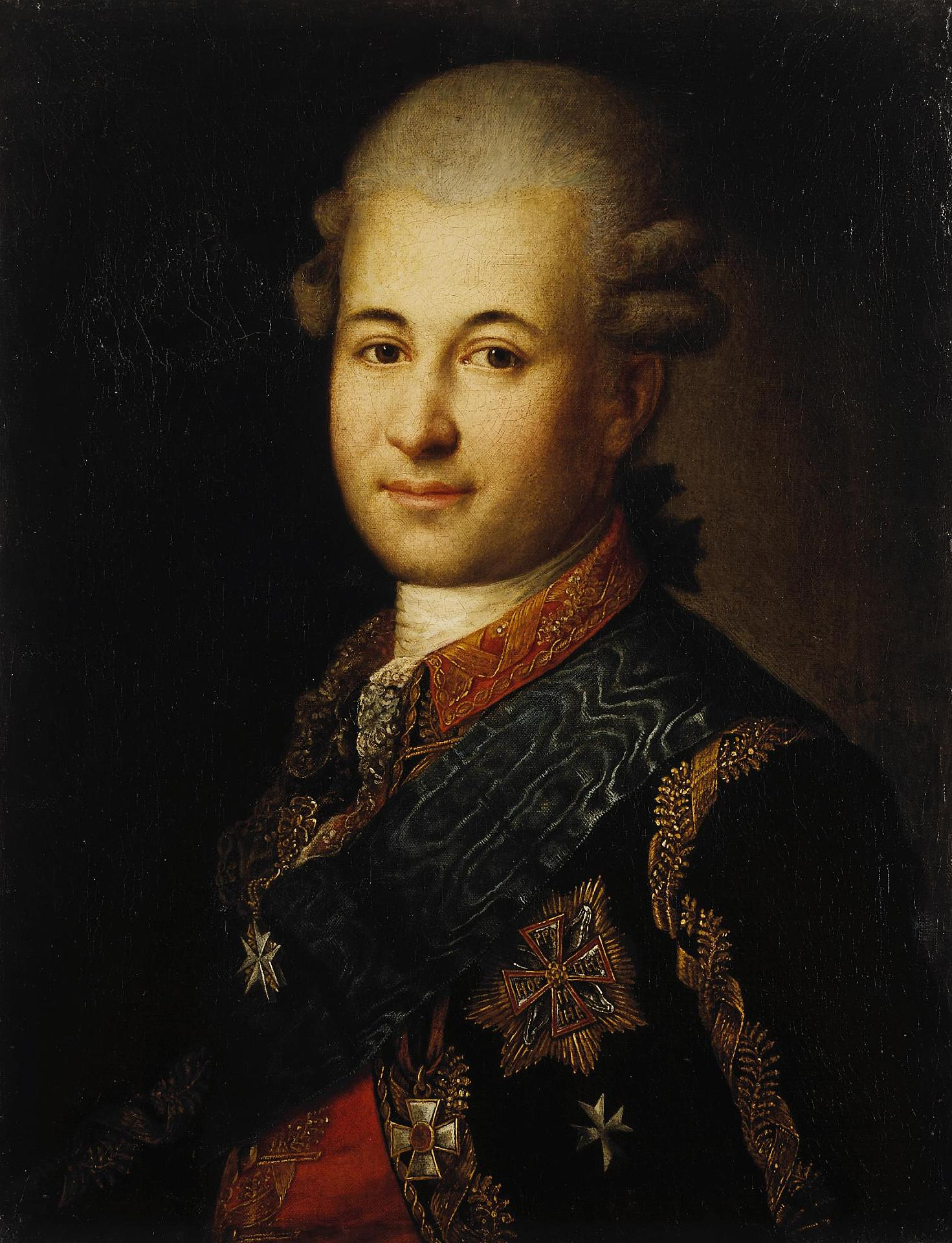
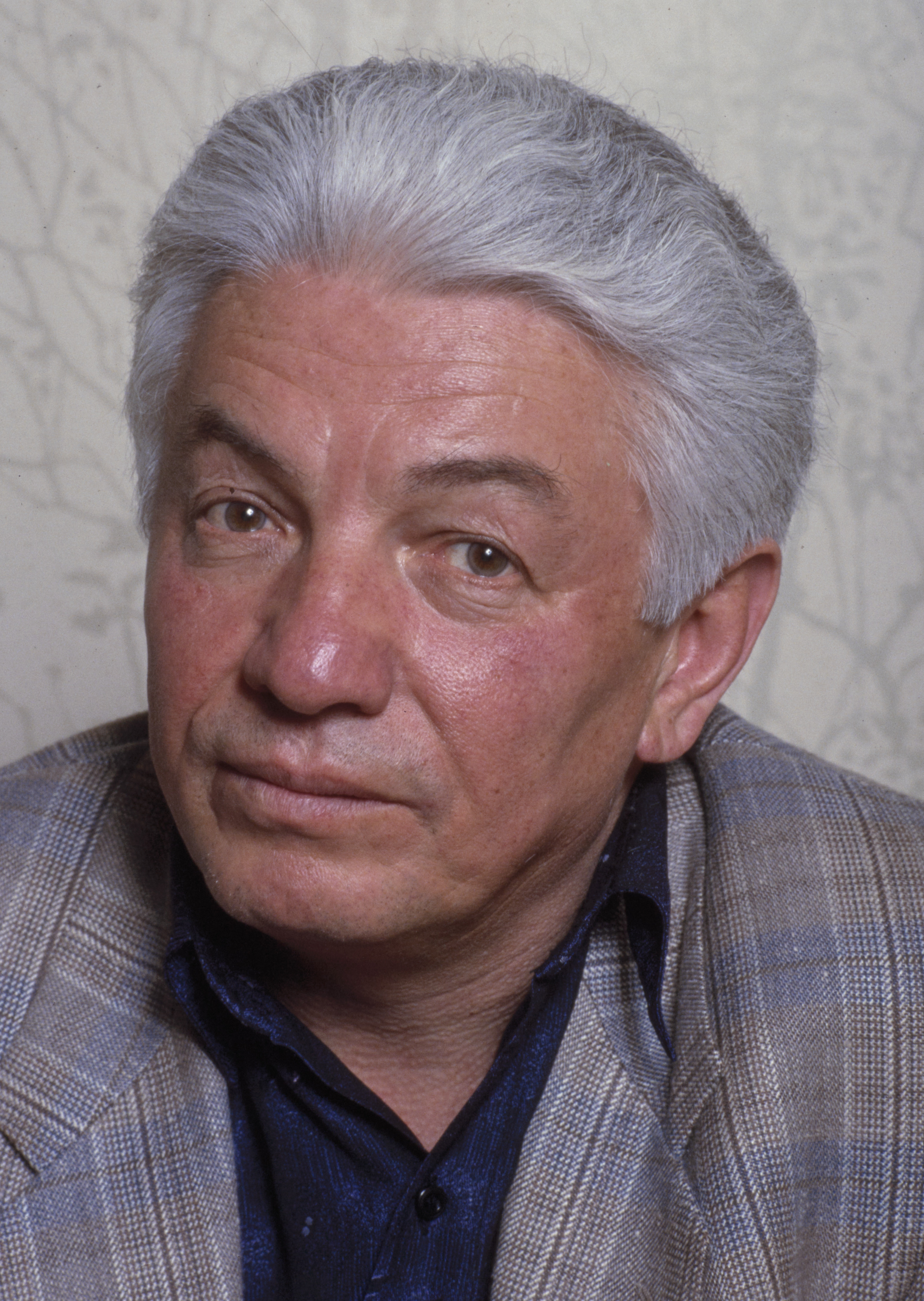
Lazar the Serb	Mikhail Miloradovich	Georgi Emmanuel	Ivan Shevich	Ilya Duka	Peter Ivelich	Nikolay Depreradovich	Nikolay Vuich
Teodor Janković-Mirijevski	Marko Ivelich	Vasily Karazin	Atanasije Stojković	Alexander Knyazhevich	Semyon Zorich	Yevgeny Vuchetich	Vladimir Voinovich

- Nikolay Bogdanov – general of the Napoleonic Wars, from Slavo-Serbia
- Jovan Albanez – commander of the Serbian Hussar Regiment
- Andrei Bakich – White general
- Ivan Adamovich – general of the Napoleonic Wars, from Slavo-Serbia
- Nikolay Depreradovich – general of the Napoleonic Wars
- Leontii Depreradovich – general of the Napoleonic Wars
- Rajko Depreradović – Habsburg Military Frontiersman, colonist, founder of Slavo-Serbia
- Nikolai Dimitrievich Dabić – Vice-admiral of the Russian Imperial Navy
- Andrej Dudrovich – philosopher, professor and rector of Kharkiv University
- Baron Ilya Duka – general of the Napoleonic Wars
- Count Georgi Emmanuel – general of the Napoleonic Wars
- Teodor Filipović – writer and one of the first professors at Kharkiv University
- Jeremija Gagić – diplomat in the service of the Russian Empire
- Elena Glinskaya – Russian consort, mother of emperor Ivan the Terrible, maternal Serb descent
- Anto Gvozdenović – ambassador
- Jovan Horvat – founder of the New Serbia by the right bank of the Donets River between the Bakhmut and Luhan River
- Count Marko Ivelich – general
- Peter Ivelich – general of the Napoleonic Wars
- Teodor Janković-Mirijevski – educational reformer
- Jefrem Janković Tetovac – Bishop of Yuryevo
- Aleksej Jelačić – historian
- John of Shanghai and San Francisco – Orthodox ascetic and hierarch of the Russian Orthodox Church Outside Russia
- Vasily Karazin – educator, founder of the Ministry of Education and Kharkiv University
- Nikolay Karazin – artist
- Alexander Knyazhevich – Minister of Finance
- Dmitry Knyazhevich – military general and Olympic fencer
- Simeon Končarević – Orthodox bishop
- Lazar the Serb – one of the earliest inventors of clocks.
- Miloš Marić – biologist and head of the department of histology at Saratov State University
- Vukašin Marković – communist revolutionary
- Andrei Miloradovich – Lieutenant General
- Count Mikhail Miloradovich – general prominent during the Napoleonic Wars
- Fedor Mirkovich – general and Governor General of Lithuania
- Mikhail Mirkovich – general and ethnographer
- Elena Mrozovskaya – professional photographer in both the Russian Empire and Soviet Union
- Mina Lazarević Nikšić – volunteer commander, colonist
- Ilija Novokršteni – cavalry captain
- Pachomius the Serb – Serbian and Russian hagiographer.
- Simeon Piščević – Austrian and Russian general major
- Avram Ratkov – general of the Napoleonic Wars
- Ivan Shevich – general in the Napoleonic Wars, Serb paternal descent
- Jovan Šević – Habsburg Military Frontiersman, colonist, founder of Slavo-Serbia
- Atanasije Stojković – writer and one of the first professors at Kharkiv University, the founder of the Russian meteoritics
- Dejan Subotić – general
- Peter Tekeli – General-in-Chief of the Russian Imperial Army, former Frontiersman
- Gligorije Trlajic – writer, poet, polyglot and professor of law at the universities of Saint Petersburg and Kharkiv
- Sava Vladislavich – Serbian diplomat, count, and merchant-adventurer in the employ of Peter the Great who conducted important diplomatic negotiations in Constantinople, Rome, and Beijing
- Marko Voinovich – Russian admiral, founder of Black Sea Fleet
- Yevgeny Vuchetich – sculptor
- Nikolay Vuich – general of the Napoleonic Wars
- Ivan Yankovich – general of the Napoleonic Wars
- Stefano Zannowich – writer and adventurer
- Semyon Zorich – Imperial Russian lieutenant-general and count of the Holy Roman Empire

== See also ==
- Serb diaspora
- Russia–Serbia relations

== Sources ==
- Atnagulov, R.E.I., 2017. Demographic characteristics of the Serbs in Russia. Nasleđe, Kragujevac, 14(37-1), pp. 27–31.
- Branković, Zoran (1995). Srbi u Ruskoj Imperiji. Dunaj. ISBN 9788682465034.
- Davidović, Blagoje (2003). Srbi u istoriji Rusije. Narodna knjiga–Alfa. ISBN 978-8633108119.
- Kostić, Mita; Lalić, Sredoje; Gavrilović, Slavko (2001). Nova Srbija i Slavenosrbija. Srpsko-ukrajinsko društvo. ISBN 978-86-902499-1-6.
