= Ivan Yankovich =

Russian soldier

Ivan Fedorovich Yankovich de Mirievo Ivan Janković de Mirievo
- Born: before 1777
- Died: 6 June 1811; Cherkasy, Russian Empire
- Relatives: Teodor Janković-Mirijevski (father)
- Military career
- Allegiance: Russian Empire
- Branch: Army
- Service years: 1776–1811
- Rank: Lieutenant General
- Unit: Life Guard Horse Regiment
- Wars: War of the Third Coalition; War of the Fourth Coalition; Finnish War
- Awards: Order of St. George; Order of St. Vladimir; Order of Saint Anna; Order of St. John of Jerusalem

Ivan Fedorovich Yankovich de Mirievo (before 1777–6 June 1811) was an Imperial Russian soldier who saw service in the Napoleonic Wars.

Yankovich was born sometime before 1777, the son of renowned educational reformer Teodor Janković de Mirievo, a Serbian immigrant and member of the Russian Academy ennobled by Catherine the Great. The younger Yankovich began his military career in 1795 in the Life Guard Horse Regiment, the unit in which he remained until his death.

He participated in the War of the Third Coalition, during which he fought at the Battle of Austerlitz. He later fought against the French in the War of the Fourth Coalition and the Swedish in the Finnish War as commander of the Life Guard Horse Regiment. In early 1811 Yankovich was promoted to lieutenant general and given command of the Light Guards Cavalry Division. Unfortunately, in June of that year he fell ill and died while traveling from Saint Petersburg to Cherkasy, just 12 months before the French invasion of Russia took place.

== See also ==
- Serbs in Russia
- Mikhail Miloradovich
- Georgi Emmanuel
- Nikolay Depreradovich
- Ilya Duka
- Ivan Shevich
- Ivan Adamovich
