= Peter Tekeli =

Russian general-in-chief of Serb origin (1720–1792)

Peter Avramovich Tekeli
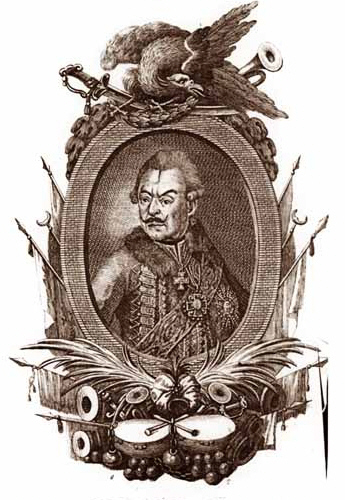
- 1787 engraving, exhibited in the National Pushkin Museum, Saint Petersburg

Viceroy of Caucasus
- In office 1787–1789
- Preceded by: Pavel Potemkin
- Succeeded by: Ivan Saltykov

Personal details
- Born: 1720 Arad, Military Frontier, Habsburg monarchy
- Died: 1792 (aged 71–72) Novomirgorod, Russian Empire
- Relations: Sava Tekelija, his nephew
- Awards: Order of St. George; Order of St. Anna; Order of St. Alexander Nevsky; Cross of Saint Vladimir

Military service
- Allegiance: Russia
- Branch/service: Cavalry
- Years of service: 1741–1748 (Pomorišje Militia in the army of Habsburg Monarchy); 1748–1790 (Imperial Russian Army)
- Rank: General-in-Chief
- Commands: Arad Company of Pomorišje Militia; Serbian Hussar Regiment; Armed forces in Novorossiya
- Battles/wars: War of the Austrian Succession; Seven Years' War; Russo-Turkish War (1768–1774); Siege of Giurgiu (1770); Sheikh Mansur Movement; Russo-Turkish War (1787–1792)

Peter Tekeli (Russian: Пётр Авраамович Текели, romanized: Pyotr Avraamovich Tekeli; Serbian: Петар Поповић Текелија, romanized: Petar Popović Tekelija; Hungarian: Tököly-Popovics Péter; 1720–1792) was a Russian general-in-chief of Serb origin. He achieved the highest rank among the Serbs who served in the Imperial Russian Army.

Tekeli was born in a noble family of military tradition, whose men were officers of the Austrian army in the Military Frontier. Prior to his emigration to Russia in 1748, he fought as a young officer in the War of the Austrian Succession. Characterized by both courage and military cunning, he made a splendid career in Russia. He participated in the Seven Years' War, the Russo-Turkish War of 1768–1774 and the Russo-Turkish War of 1787–1792. Under his command, the Zaporozhian Cossacks were disbanded and subjugated to the Imperial authority in 1775, without spilling a single drop of blood, for which he received the Order of Saint Alexander Nevsky from Empress Catherine the Great. He retired in 1790, and died two years later in his mansion at Novomirgorod.

== Family background and early career ==
The Tekeli family emigrated to the Kingdom of Hungary from the village of Tekija in eastern Serbia (then part of the Ottoman Empire), long before the Great Serb Migrations. Peter Tekeli was a grandson of Jovan Tekelija and a son of Ranko Tekeli. Colonel Jovan Tekeli of Arad was at the beginning of the 18th century the commander-in-chief of Pomorišje section of the Military Frontier. As the commander of the Pomorišje Militia, he distinguished himself in the Battle of Senta in 1697, significantly contributing to the Austrian victory. After his military successes in suppression of the Rákóczi's War for Independence, he was granted a hereditary nobility title by Emperor Joseph I. He had a prominent role in the conquest of Timişoara in 1716. His good relations with the Habsburgs deteriorated later; he even visited Rákóczi in his exile in Rodosto. The Tekeli family was ever since regarded with mistrust by the Austrians, and Jovan’s son Ranko never rose above the rank of captain. Ranko married Alka, a daughter of Mojsej Rašković, commander-in-chief of the Danube section of Military Frontier. They had four sons, the third of whom was Peter.

Peter Tekeli was born in Arad, Military Frontier of Pomorišje, on 16 January (O.S.)/27 January (N.S.) 1720. He is best known in Russian historiography as Pyotr Abramovich. At the age of 21, with the rank of lieutenant, he went to the War of the Austrian Succession. At that time his father Ranko was the commander of the Arad Company of Pomorišje Militia. When the war started, Ranko fell ill and deputed Peter to command the company. The war ended in 1748, and Peter, after seven years, returned to his hometown as an honored soldier. He wanted to remain the commander of the Arad company, but his father was not willing to cede the authority. The ambitious Peter decided to emigrate to the Russian Empire. Since the reign of Peter the Great, Serbs from the Military Frontier had been emigrating to Russia, which welcomed them. The number of Serb immigrants in Russia allowed its military command to form the Serbian Hussar Regiment in 1727. It was stationed in the region of the Tor Fortress. Peter applied for discharge from the Austrian army, which he was granted, and emigrated to Russia in 1748. Admitted to the Imperial Russian Army, he was commissioned the rank of porutchik, and sent to the Serbian Hussar Regiment. He was given the assignment to popularize the emigration to Russia among the Serbs of Pomorišje. His presence and activities in this region, however, were not welcome with the Austrians, who finally banished him. In 1751 Peter Tekeli was promoted to the rank of captain.

== Seven Years' War ==
Tekeli advanced further in his military career in Russia during the Seven Years' War, at the beginning of which he had the rank of second major. On 30 [O.S. 19] August 1757, he was wounded during the Battle of Gross-Jägersdorf. After his participation in the storming of the Küstrin Fortress, he was raised to the rank of lieutenant colonel in 1758. Tekeli participated in the Battle of Zorndorf, the Battle of Kay and the decisive Battle of Kunersdorf in 1759, which marked Prussia's defeat in the war.

Tekeli contributed to the Russian capture of Berlin in 1760, where he was able to destroy a retreating rearguard of Prussian General Hülsen (de) under Spandau. During the war, Tekeli was a distinguished participant in skirmishes. As the war drew to a close, Tekeli took part in the capture of Kolberg under the command of General Pyotr Rumyantsev, and was promoted for his service to the rank of colonel in 1763.

After Empress Catherine the Great took to the throne, Colonel Tekeli was soon back in combat against the Bar Confederation (1764–1768); for his distinctions he was awarded the rank of brigadier.

== Russo-Turkish Wars of 1768–1774 and 1787–1792 ==
During the first Russo-Turkish War (1768–1774), Tekeli was the commander of the Serbian Hussar Regiment. Initially, in 1769, he fought in several battles during the siege of Khotyn Fortress. With the rest of the Russian Army, he then entered Romania in 1771 and also fought in the Russo-Turkish War (1787-1792) in two major confrontations, the Battle of Focşani in 1789 and the Battle of Giurgevo. He re-captured a Russian banner there, for which he was promoted to a major general and awarded with the Order of St. Anna. Later he was the head of the right flank during the invasion of Wallachia. After numerous other distinctions, he was promoted to a lieutenant general and awarded with the Order of St. George (3rd degree) upon the war's victorious conclusion.

== Disbanding of the Zaporozhian Cossacks ==
After the Russo-Turkish War (1768-1774), Lieutenant General Tekeli was the commander of all armed forces stationed in Novorossiya. One of the prominent acts of his career was the disbanding of the Zaporozhian Cossacks and destroying their base, the Zaporozhian Sich, in summer 1775.

The Cossacks who lived in Zaporozhia were tasked in safeguarding the Russian Empire against the Crimean Khanate. Russia’s victory in the war and the annexation of Crimea, however, caused that their sole military role was lost. At the same time there were constant attacks by the Cossacks on the Serbian settlers. Antin Holovaty suggested to Grigori Potemkin to reorganize the Zaporozhian Host by the same style as the Don Cossack Host. Yet after the Zaporozhians offered support to the Pugachev's Rebellion in 1774, Potemkin's mind made up. Tired of dealing with constant feuds, he ordered Tekeli, an ethnic Serb, to disband the Host altogether.

Tekeli divided his forces into five detachments, and send them along roads which would lead them to fully surround the Sich, which was successfully deployed by dawn on 4 June. The lack of any combat in past few years had the effect that the vigilance of Zaporozhians was low, and their guards were asleep upon Tekeli's arrival. Petro Kalnyshevsky, the Kosh otaman, found out that the Sich is surrounded and besieged only after the Russian envoy arrived to call him to meet with Tekeli. By evening Russian guards were placed in all internal and external positions, and next morning the Zaporozhians officially surrendered all their arms and lowered their battle banners.

Tekeli allowed joint visits and gave permissions to the former Cossacks to leave the besieged Sich for personal reasons. As the Host’s Starshynas were sent to Saint Petersburg, the Sich was slowly vacated. When Tekeli realized that some Cossacks ran off to the Danube where they formed the Danubian Sich, he reported that to the Empress, and received order to destroy the Sich. After ensuring it was vacated, the empty fortress was subjected to a prolonged artillery fire. For his role in quelling the Zaporozhian Cossacks without spilling a single drop of blood, Tekeli was awarded the Order of St. Alexander Nevsky.

According to tradition, because of the successful pacification of Sich, Catherine II offered Tekeli to choose any prize for himself. He succinctly replied: "Forgive Horvat" (until then, Jovan Horvat, countryman and friend of Tekeli, the founder of New Serbia, was convicted of numerous abuses, stripped of all ranks and exiled to Vologda). Peter Abramovich's intercession helped – Horvat was amnestied by Catherine II on 3 December 1775, his military rank, his estates were restored and he was allowed to live in them. From 1776, Horvat lived peacefully in his possessions, where he died.

== Later life ==
In 1787 Tekeli was made general-in-chief and placed in command of the Nizhny Novgorod Dragoon Regiment. At the beginning of the second Russo-Turkish War (1787–1792), he was in command of a Russian garrison stationed to defend the eastern shore of the Black Sea. After he defeated Turks and Tatars in the Caucasus, Empress Catherine the Great awarded him with the Cross of Saint Vladimir.

In 1788 Tekeli had a bad riding accident with a stallion which a Tatar chief gave him as a gift. He resigned from active duty in 1790. Two years later he died in his mansion at Novomirgorod, and was buried in the Novomirgorod's Church of Saint Nicholas. The church was razed in the 1930s by the Stalin regime, but his grave's tombstone with the epitaph has been preserved in the museum in Kropyvnytskyi.

== See also ==
- Jovan Horvat
- Nikolay Depreradovich
- Ivan Adamovich
- Ilya Duka
- Avram Ratkov
- Nikolay Bogdanov
- Ivan Lukačević (soldier)
- Jovan Tekelija
- Matija Zmajević
- Marko Ivanovich Voinovich
- Jovan Albanez
- Jovan Šević
- Simeon Piščević
- Semyon Zorich
- Georgi Emmanuel
- Anto Gvozdenović
- Mikhail Miloradovich
- Pavle Julinac
- Dmitry Horvat
- Marko Ivelich

== Bibliography ==
- Cerović, Ljubivoje (2002). Срби у Украјини. Novi Sad: Muzej Vojvodine: Srpsko-ukrajinsko društvo. ISBN 86-82077-16-7. Archived from the original on 2014-01-11. (in Serbian)
- Kostić, Mita (2001). Нова Србија и Славеносрбија (PDF). Novi Sad: Srpsko-ukrajinsko društvo. ISBN 86-902499-1-5. Archived from the original (PDF) on 2009-03-06. (in Serbian)
- Shambarov, Valeriy Yevgen'yevich (2007). Казачество: История вольной Руси. Moscow: Алгоритм: ЭКСМО. ISBN 978-5-9265-0306-4. (in Russian)
- Tekelija, Sava (1833). "Біографіа Петра Авраамовича Текели, Российскогъ Генерала". Сербскій Лѣтописъ. 9 (2). Buda: Matica Srpska: 1–19. (in Serbian)
