= Yuryevo =

Yuryevo (Russian: Юрьево) is the name of several rural localities in Russia.

== Ivanovo Oblast ==
As of 2010, two rural localities in Ivanovo Oblast bear this name:

- Yuryevo, Puchezhsky District, Ivanovo Oblast, a village in Puchezhsky District
- Yuryevo, Yuryevetsky District, Ivanovo Oblast, a village in Yuryevetsky District

== Kaluga Oblast ==
As of 2010, one rural locality in Kaluga Oblast bears this name:

- Yuryevo, Kaluga Oblast, a village in Sukhinichsky District

== Kirov Oblast ==
As of 2010, one rural locality in Kirov Oblast bears this name:

- Yuryevo, Kirov Oblast, a selo in Yuryevsky Rural Okrug of Kotelnichsky District

== Kostroma Oblast ==
As of 2010, three rural localities in Kostroma Oblast bear this name:

- Yuryevo, Antropovsky District, Kostroma Oblast, a village in Palkinskoye Settlement of Antropovsky District
- Yuryevo, Kostromskoy District, Kostroma Oblast, a village in Minskoye Settlement of Kostromskoy District
- Yuryevo, Ostrovsky District, Kostroma Oblast, a selo in Klevantsovskoye Settlement of Ostrovsky District

== Lipetsk Oblast ==
As of 2010, one rural locality in Lipetsk Oblast bears this name:

- Yuryevo, Lipetsk Oblast, a selo in Yuryevsky Selsoviet of Zadonsky District

== Moscow ==
As of 2010, one rural locality in Moscow bears this name:

- Yuryevo, Moscow, a village in Novofedorovskoye Settlement of Troitsky Administrative Okrug

== Moscow Oblast ==
As of 2010, seven rural localities in Moscow Oblast bear this name:

- Yuryevo, Dmitrovsky District, Moscow Oblast, a village in Sinkovskoye Rural Settlement of Dmitrovsky District
- Yuryevo, Istrinsky District, Moscow Oblast, a village in Obushkovskoye Rural Settlement of Istrinsky District
- Yuryevo, Mozhaysky District, Moscow Oblast, a village in Yurlovskoye Rural Settlement of Mozhaysky District
- Yuryevo, Mytishchinsky District, Moscow Oblast, a village in Fedoskinskoye Rural Settlement of Mytishchinsky District
- Yuryevo, Shakhovskoy District, Moscow Oblast, a village under the administrative jurisdiction of the work settlement of Shakhovskaya in Shakhovskoy District
- Yuryevo, Volokolamsky District, Moscow Oblast, a village in Spasskoye Rural Settlement of Volokolamsky District
- Yuryevo, Yegoryevsky District, Moscow Oblast, a village in Yurtsovskoye Rural Settlement of Yegoryevsky District

== Nizhny Novgorod Oblast ==
As of 2010, one rural locality in Nizhny Novgorod Oblast bears this name:

- Yuryevo, Nizhny Novgorod Oblast, a selo in Yuryevsky Selsoviet of Gaginsky District

== Novgorod Oblast ==
As of 2010, five rural localities in Novgorod Oblast bear this name:

- Yuryevo, Borovichsky District, Novgorod Oblast, a village in Konchansko-Suvorovskoye Settlement of Borovichsky District
- Yuryevo, Novgorodsky District, Novgorod Oblast, a village in Rakomskoye Settlement of Novgorodsky District
- Yuryevo, Okulovsky District, Novgorod Oblast, a village in Berezovikskoye Settlement of Okulovsky District
- Yuryevo, Parfinsky District, Novgorod Oblast, a village in Fedorkovskoye Settlement of Parfinsky District
- Yuryevo, Poddorsky District, Novgorod Oblast, a village in Poddorskoye Settlement of Poddorsky District

== Omsk Oblast ==
As of 2010, one rural locality in Omsk Oblast bears this name:

- Yuryevo, Omsk Oblast, a selo in Yuryevsky Rural Okrug of Kormilovsky District

== Oryol Oblast ==
As of 2010, two rural localities in Oryol Oblast bear this name:

- Yuryevo, Kolpnyansky District, Oryol Oblast, a village in Belokolodezsky Selsoviet of Kolpnyansky District
- Yuryevo, Pokrovsky District, Oryol Oblast, a village in Vladimirovsky Selsoviet of Pokrovsky District

== Pskov Oblast ==
As of 2010, two rural localities in Pskov Oblast bear this name:

- Yuryevo, Dedovichsky District, Pskov Oblast, a village in Dedovichsky District
- Yuryevo, Opochetsky District, Pskov Oblast, a village in Opochetsky District

== Ryazan Oblast ==
As of 2010, one rural locality in Ryazan Oblast bears this name:

- Yuryevo, Ryazan Oblast, a selo in Yuryevsky Rural Okrug of Pitelinsky District

== Tula Oblast ==
As of 2010, two rural localities in Tula Oblast bear this name:

- Yuryevo, Leninsky District, Tula Oblast, a village in Inshinsky Rural Okrug of Leninsky District
- Yuryevo, Plavsky District, Tula Oblast, a village in Prigorodny Rural Okrug of Plavsky District

== Tver Oblast ==
As of 2010, five rural localities in Tver Oblast bear this name:

- Yuryevo, Dmitrovogorskoye Rural Settlement, Konakovsky District, Tver Oblast, a village in Dmitrovogorskoye Rural Settlement of Konakovsky District
- Yuryevo, Kozlovskoye Rural Settlement, Konakovsky District, Tver Oblast, a village in Kozlovskoye Rural Settlement of Konakovsky District
- Yuryevo, Molokovsky District, Tver Oblast, a village in Akhmatovskoye Rural Settlement of Molokovsky District
- Yuryevo, Sandovsky District, Tver Oblast, a selo in Starosandovskoye Rural Settlement of Sandovsky District
- Yuryevo, Torzhoksky District, Tver Oblast, a village in Gruzinskoye Rural Settlement of Torzhoksky District

== Vologda Oblast ==
As of 2010, one rural locality in Vologda Oblast bears this name:

- Yuryevo, Vologda Oblast, a village in Leskovsky Selsoviet of Vologodsky District

== Yaroslavl Oblast ==
As of 2010, six rural localities in Yaroslavl Oblast bear this name:

- Yuryevo, Danilovsky District, Yaroslavl Oblast, a village in Maryinsky Rural Okrug of Danilovsky District
- Yuryevo, Lyubimsky District, Yaroslavl Oblast, a village in Osetsky Rural Okrug of Lyubimsky District
- Yuryevo, Nekrasovsky District, Yaroslavl Oblast, a village in Diyevo-Gorodishchensky Rural Okrug of Nekrasovsky District
- Yuryevo, Uglichsky District, Yaroslavl Oblast, a village in Putchinsky Rural Okrug of Uglichsky District
- Yuryevo, Levtsovsky Rural Okrug, Yaroslavsky District, Yaroslavl Oblast, a village in Levtsovsky Rural Okrug of Yaroslavsky District
- Yuryevo, Nekrasovsky Rural Okrug, Yaroslavsky District, Yaroslavl Oblast, a village in Nekrasovsky Rural Okrug of Yaroslavsky District
