= Michael von Reutern =

Russian finance minister (1820–1890)

Graf Michael von Reutern
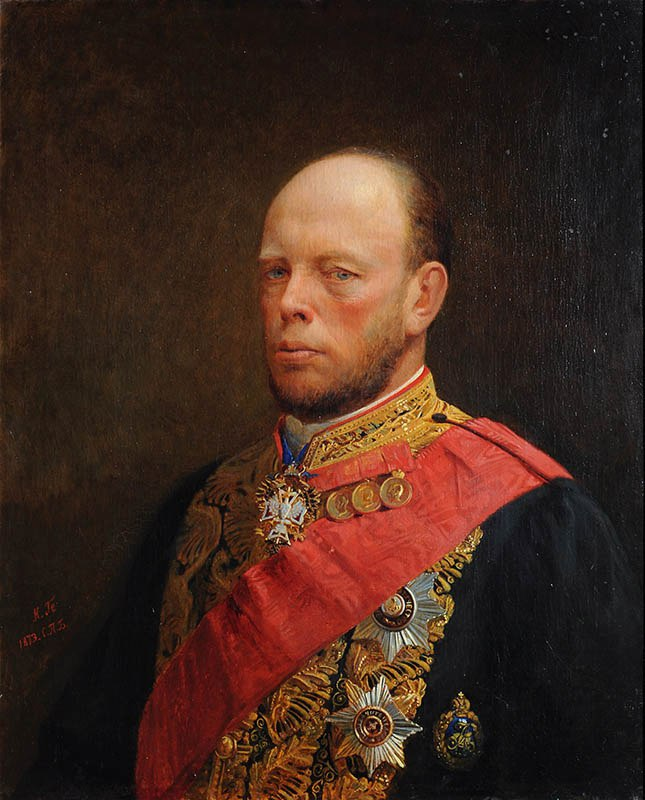
- Portrait by Nikolai Ge, 1873

Finance Minister of Russia
- In office 23 January [O.S. 11] 1862 – 7 July [O.S. 25 June] 1878
- Monarch: Alexander II
- Preceded by: Alexander Knyazhevich
- Succeeded by: Samuil Greig

Chairman of the Committee of Ministers
- In office 1881–1886
- Monarch: Alexander III
- Preceded by: Pyotr Aleksandrovich Valuyev
- Succeeded by: Nikolai von Bunge

Personal details
- Born: Michael von Reutern; 24 September [O.S. 12 September] 1820 Porechye, Smolensk Governorate, Russian Empire
- Died: 23 August [O.S. 11 August] 1890 (aged 69) Tsarskoye Selo, Saint Petersburg, Russian Empire
- Resting place: Groß-Essern Manor

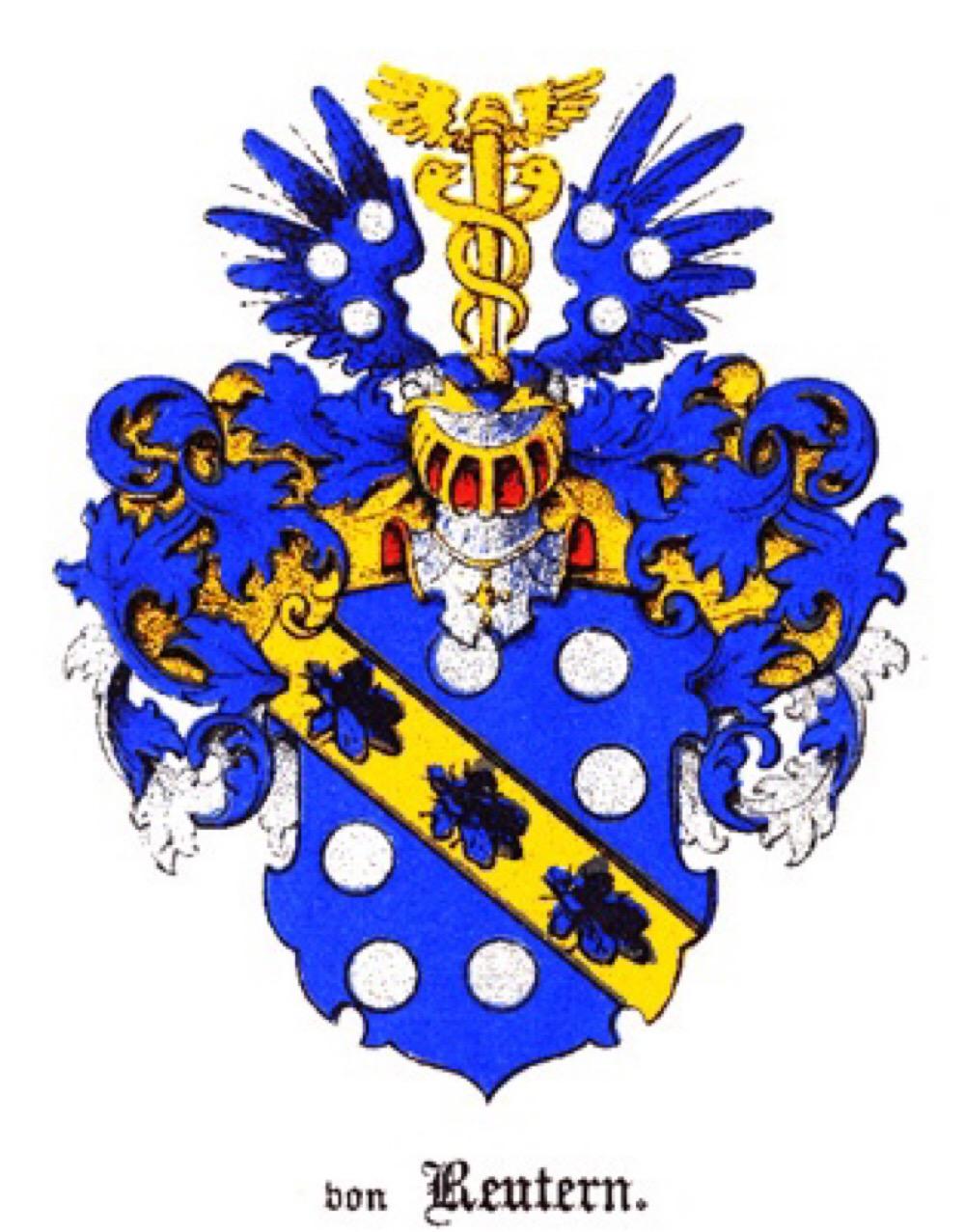
Coat of arms of the Middendorff family, in the Baltic Coat of arms book by Carl Arvid von Klingspor in 1882.

Michael Graf von Reutern (Russian: Михаил Христофорович Рейтерн, romanized: Mikhail Khristoforovich Reytern; 24 September [O.S. 12 September] 1820 – 23 August [O.S. 11 August] 1890) was a Russian statesman of Baltic German origin who served as the finance minister from 1862 to 1878.

== Life ==
Reutern was born on 24 September [O.S. 12 September] 1820 in Porechye of Smolensk Governorate in Russia. He came from the Baltic German noble family of Reutern; his father Christoph Adam von Reutern (1782–1833) was a lieutenant-general in the Imperial Russian Army and his mother Charlotte Elisabeth von Helffreich was a noblewoman. He was the nephew of the famous painter Gerhardt Wilhelm von Reutern. The Reuterns were of Holsteinish descent, originating in Lübeck. The family was originally called Reuter, they got their name when Johann Reuter (1635–1698), a merchant, was raised to in the Swedish nobility in 1691.

Reutern graduated from the Tsarskoye Selo Lyceum in 1837. He started his career as a civil servant in the ministry of finance in 1840; he was transferred to the Ministry of Justice in 1843, where he remained until 1854. In 1862, he was appointed finance minister under the liberal reformist tsar, Alexander II, and introduced a system of public accounting. Reutern's period in office was also marked by the promotion of private credit institutions and attempts to stabilise the ruble. He succeeded in reforming taxation and customs laws, by abolishing the spirits lease and the introduction of an excise tax on brandy. Government revenues rose significantly, the chronic budget deficit was removed in 1867, and budgetary surpluses were achieved from 1873. On trade policy, Reutern pragmatically supported reducing some tariffs and duties on manufacturing goods in 1863 and 1868.

The Russo-Turkish War reversed some of the measures that had led to Reutern's successes, and he resigned in 1878.

== Sources ==
- "Рейтерн, Михаил Христофорович" . Brockhaus and Efron Encyclopedic Dictionary (in Russian). 1906.
