= Alexander Knyazhevich =

Russian Imperial finance minister

Alexander Maximovich Knyazhevich Александр Максимович Княжевич
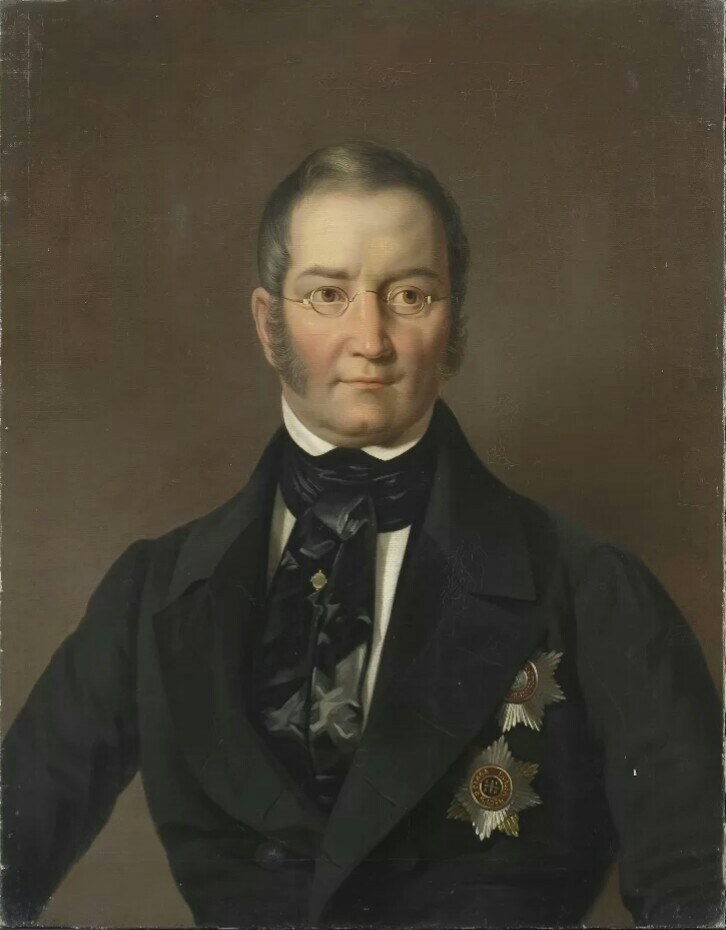

Minister of Finance
- In office 23 March 1858 – 23 January 1862
- Monarch: Alexander II
- Preceded by: Peter Brock
- Succeeded by: Michael von Reutern

Personal details
- Born: 11 October [O.S. 30 September] 1792 Ufa, Ufa Viceroyalty, Russian Empire
- Died: 2 March [O.S. 18 February] 1872 Saint Petersburg, Russian Empire
- Education: Imperial Kazan University

Alexander Maximovich Knyazhevich (Russian: Александр Максимович Княжевич; 11 October [O.S. 30 September] 1792 – 2 March [O.S. 18 February] 1872) was a Russian statesman of Serbian origin who served as Minister of Finance from 1858 to 1862. Knyazhevich pursued a policy of transparency and economic reform while in office, but resigned due to poor health and the effects of and a personal feud with Grand Duke Konstantin Nikolayevich.

== Biography ==
Knyazhevich was born in Ufa, the son of a Serb father who came to Russia in 1779 and subsequently rose through the ranks of the Imperial Russian Army and civil service, earning hereditary nobility for his family. His career in civil service began in 1811 and he was a comrade of Georg Ludwig Cancrin, who previously served as minister from 1823 to 1844. To seek a cure to the growing problem of gold exiting the empire through tourism and emigration, Knyazhevich proposed a tax on Russian subjects abroad, but his proposal was rejected by the government, which did not want to restrict financial activities, despite the poor economic effects. Knyazhevich also strongly advocated for a government program to support industrial development in the form of new private enterprises in the coal, mechanical engineering, textiles, and rail industries to combat the growing revenue crisis. The foremost accomplishment of Knyazhevich's tenure as Minister of Finance was the creation of the State Bank of the Russian Empire in 1860. Knyazhevich fought diligently to regularize budget estimates and persuaded the Tsar to allow freedom of discussion pertaining to economic questions in the Russian press. Though Knyazhevich was a reformer, he found an opponent in fellow reformer Grand Duke Konstantin Nikolayevich due to personal rivalries within the government. The Grand Duke attempted to undermine Knyazhevich's ministry by splitting the sub-departments of mining and commerce into separate ministries and spreading rumors. Ultimately, the feud resulted in a worsened public reputation for Knyazhevich, who was blamed for failing to control inflation. This led Knyazhevich to resign his post, and he was then succeeded as Minister of Finance by Michael von Reutern, who was hand-picked by the Grand Duke.
