= Leontii Depreradovich =

Russian general

Leontii Ivanovich Depreradovich
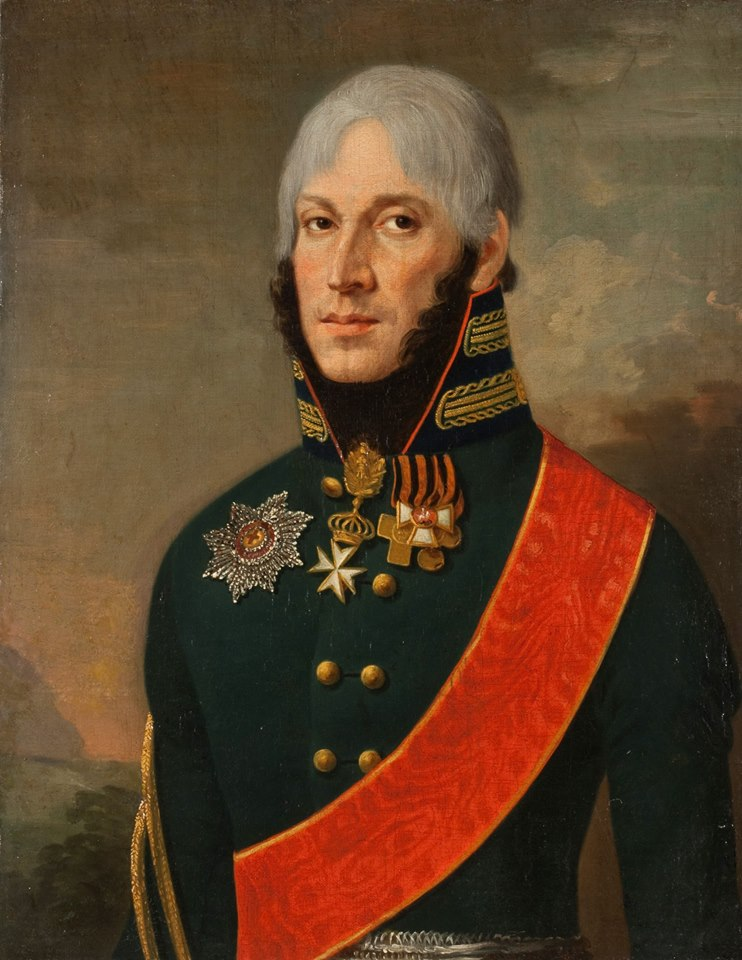
- Native name: Леонтий Иванович Депрерадович
- Born: 1766; Novorossiya, Imperial Russia
- Died: 19 February 1844 (aged 77–78) St. Petersburg, Imperial Russia
- Allegiance: Russian Empire
- Branch: Army
- Service years: 1771–1807
- Rank: Major General
- Commands: Semyonovsky Life Guards Regiment
- Wars: War of the Third Coalition; Battle of Austerlitz; War of the Fourth Coalition; Battle of Guttstadt-Deppen; Battle of Heilsberg; Battle of Friedland
- Awards: Order of St. George; Order of Saint Anna; Order of St. John of Jerusalem

Leontii Ivanovich Depreradovich (1766 – 19 February 1844) was a major general of the Imperial Russian Army during the Napoleonic Wars. He was the elder brother of fellow general Nikolay Depreradovich, both scions of a Serbian noble family that settled in Russia. Depreradovich participated in the War of the Fourth Coalition and the War of the Fifth Coalition and served as commander of the Semyonovsky Life Guards Regiment between 1799 and 1807. Alongside his brother, Depreradovich saw action at the Battle of Austerlitz in 1805, in which he commanded the 1st Brigade of the Guard Infantry Division.
