= Ivan Shevich =

Serb nobleman

Ivan Egorovich Shevich
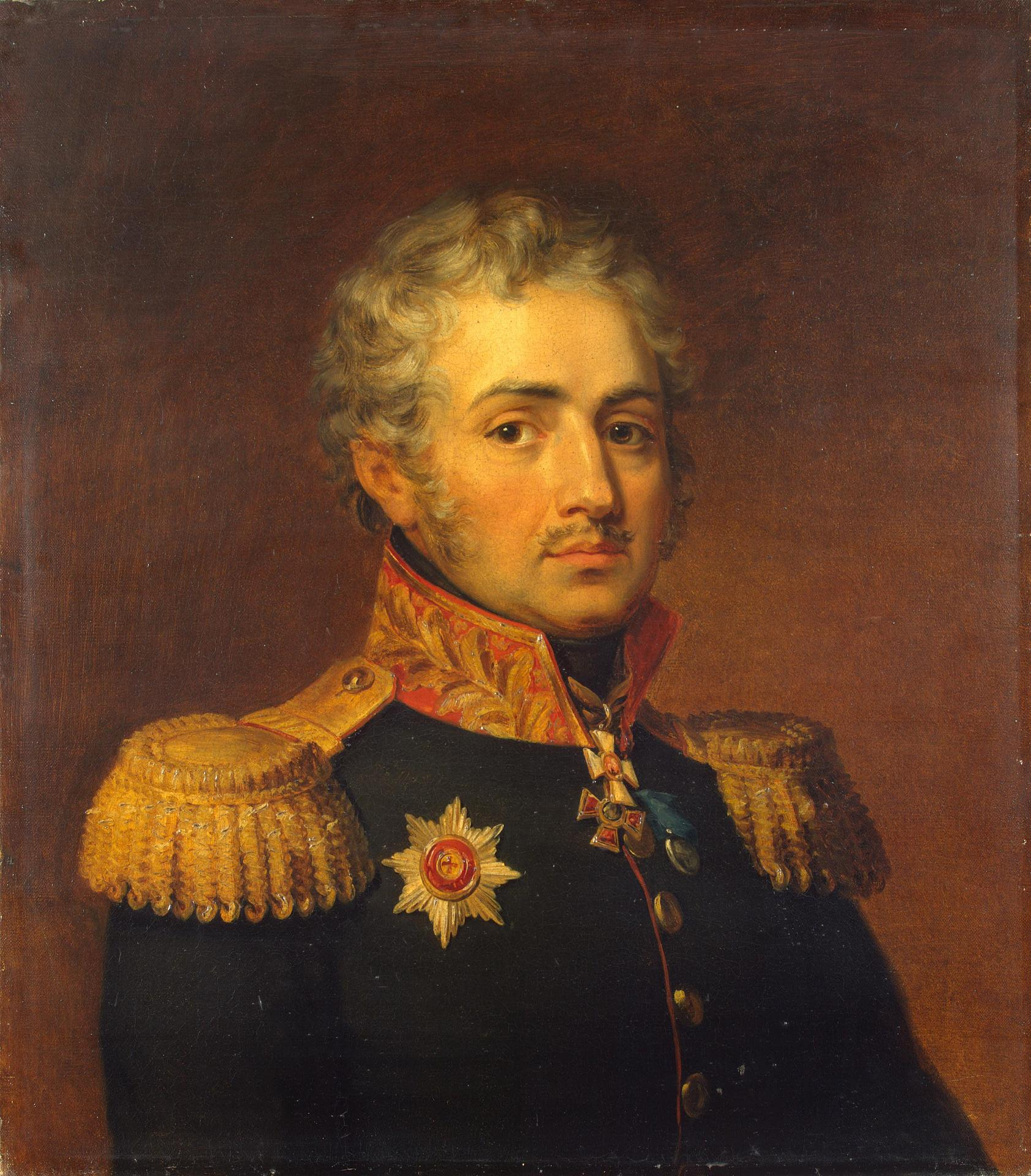
- Portrait by George Dawe in the Military Gallery of the Winter Palace
- Born: 1754
- Died: 4 October 1813 (aged 58–59) Leipzig, Prussia
- Allegiance: Russian Empire
- Branch: Army
- Service years: 1772–1813
- Rank: Lieutenant General
- Commands: Life Guards Hussar Regiment
- Wars: Sixth Russo-Turkish War; Seventh Russo-Turkish War; Eighth Russo-Turkish War; Patriotic War of 1812; War of the Sixth Coalition; Battle of Lützen; Battle of Bautzen; Battle of Kulm; Battle of Leipzig
- Awards: Order of St. George; Order of St. Vladimir; Gold Sword for Bravery; Order of Saint Anna

Ivan Egorovich (Georgievich) Shevich (Russian: Иван Егорович Шевич; Serbian: Иван Шевић; 1754–4 October 1813) was a Russian-born Serb nobleman who was one of the leading fighting-generals, and one of the bravest, in the Russian Imperial army under the command of Mikhail Kutuzov and Emperor Alexander I in the war against Napoleonic France. His grandfather, Lieutenant-General Jovan Šević, led Serb colonists from the Habsburg Monarchy to Imperial Russia during the reign of Empress Elizabeth Petrovna. Today his portrait hangs with other generals in the Military Gallery of the 1812 State Hermitage at St. Petersburg.

== Biography ==
Ivan Shevich was born into a noble Serbian family in Slavo-Serbia in 1754. His father Georgije was the son of Jovan Šević who led the migration of Serbs from the Habsburg Monarchy Military Frontier to Russia. There Ivan spent most of his childhood in Novorossiya, the new name given by Catherine the Great to the territories gained from the Tartars and Turks and settled by Serbs and other co-religionists, Slavs and Vlachs. After completing his training, he entered the Russian military service at the age of 16, becoming a sergeant of the Moscow Legion. Two years later he received the first officer's rank of ensign while serving already in the Illyric Hussars. In 1773, he participated in a campaign in the Crimea, and the following year, in the suppression of a peasant uprising led by Yemelyan Pugachev, where he stood up to this baptism of fire.

As a cavalry officer, he fought the Mountaineers in the Kuban, then against the Ottoman Turks in 1788 at Ochakov, Căuşeni, and Bender (during the "Second Catherine's Turkish War"). In 1794, his cavalry was sent against the Polish Confederates. He became a colonel in 1798 at the age of 44. In October 1799, he was appointed the commander of the Glukhovsky Cuirassier Regiment, but after four months Emperor Paul I asked for his resignation.

Emperor Alexander I, returned Shevich to service in December 1806. The following year Shevich fought the Turks on the Danube, in Wallachia. In actions against the garrison of the Brăila fortress, he commanded a separate detachment. In December of the same 1807, Major General Shevich was appointed a member of the Ministry of War for the Commissariat Expedition. On 28 November 1808, he received the command of the Life Guards Hussar Regiment, which in 1812 was part of the army of Barclay de Tolly.

In the Campaign of 1813, he participated in the battles of Lutzen, Bautzen, and Kulm. For valor shown at Kulm, he was promoted to lieutenant general on 30 August 1813.

He was killed in the Battle of Leipzig on 4 October 1813.

== Awards and decorations ==
- Silver Medal Commemorating the Patriotic War of 1812 for participating in the defense of the Fatherland;
- Order of St. George, III class (25 February 1813, for courage in the battles of the Krasnoe);
- Order of Saint Vladimir, III degree,
- Order of Saint Anna, I degree; and
- Golden Weapon "For Bravery" with diamonds.

== See also ==
- Peter Mikhailovich Kaptzevich
- Rajko Depreradović
- Jovan Šević
- Jovan Horvat
