= Georgi Emmanuel =

Russian general (d. 1837)

Count Georgi Arsenyevich Emmanuel
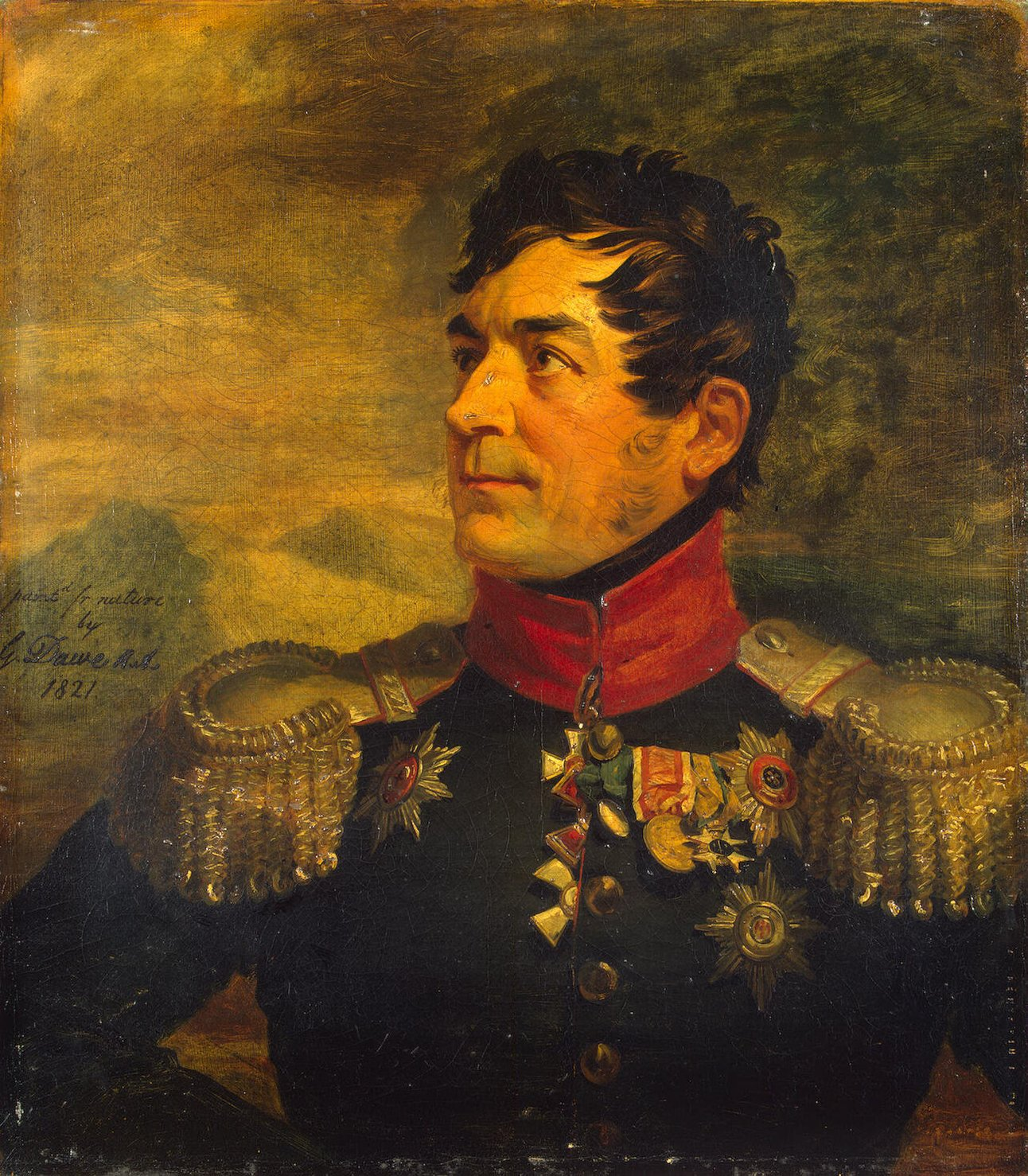
- Portrait by George Dawe in the Military Gallery of the Winter Palace
- Born: Ђорђе Мануиловић; Djordje Manuilović; 13 April 1775; Vršac, Banat of Temeschwar
- Died: 26 January 1837 (aged 61); Yelisavetgrad, Russian Empire
- Military career
- Allegiance: Habsburg Monarchy; Russian Empire
- Branch: Army
- Service years: 1789–1831
- Rank: General of the Cavalry
- Conflicts: Austro-Turkish War (1788–1791); Siege of Belgrade; War of the First Coalition; Siege of Landau; War of the Fourth Coalition; Battle of Pułtusk; Battle of Guttstadt-Deppen; Battle of Heilsberg; Battle of Friedland; Austro-Polish War; Patriotic War of 1812; Battle of Mir; Battle of Saltanovka; Battle of Smolensk; Battle of Borodino; Battle of Tarutino; Battle of Vyazma; War of the Sixth Coalition; Battle of Bautzen; Battle of the Katzbach; Battle of Leipzig; Battle of Reims; Russo-Turkish War (1828-1829)
- Awards: Order of the Sword Commander 1st class, Order of the Red Eagle 1st class, Order of St. George 3rd class, Order of St. Anna 1st class Order of St. Vladimir 4th class, Order of Saint Alexander Nevsky; Golden Sword for Bravery

Count Georgi Arsenyevich Emmanuel (Russian: Георгий Арсеньевич Эммануэль) (13 April 1775–26 January 1837) was a Russian general of Serbian origin who participated in the Napoleonic Wars.

He was promoted to major general on 26 December 1812 and after the end of the battle of Paris to general on 27 March 1814. After returning to Russia, he was put in command of the 4th Dragoon Division. On 25 June 1825, he became the supreme commander and governor of the Caucasus. He was promoted to general of the cavalry in July 1828, during the Russo-Turkish War (1828-29). In 1829, he organised and led the first Russian scientific expedition to Mount Elbrus, for which he was made a member of the Russian Academy of Sciences.

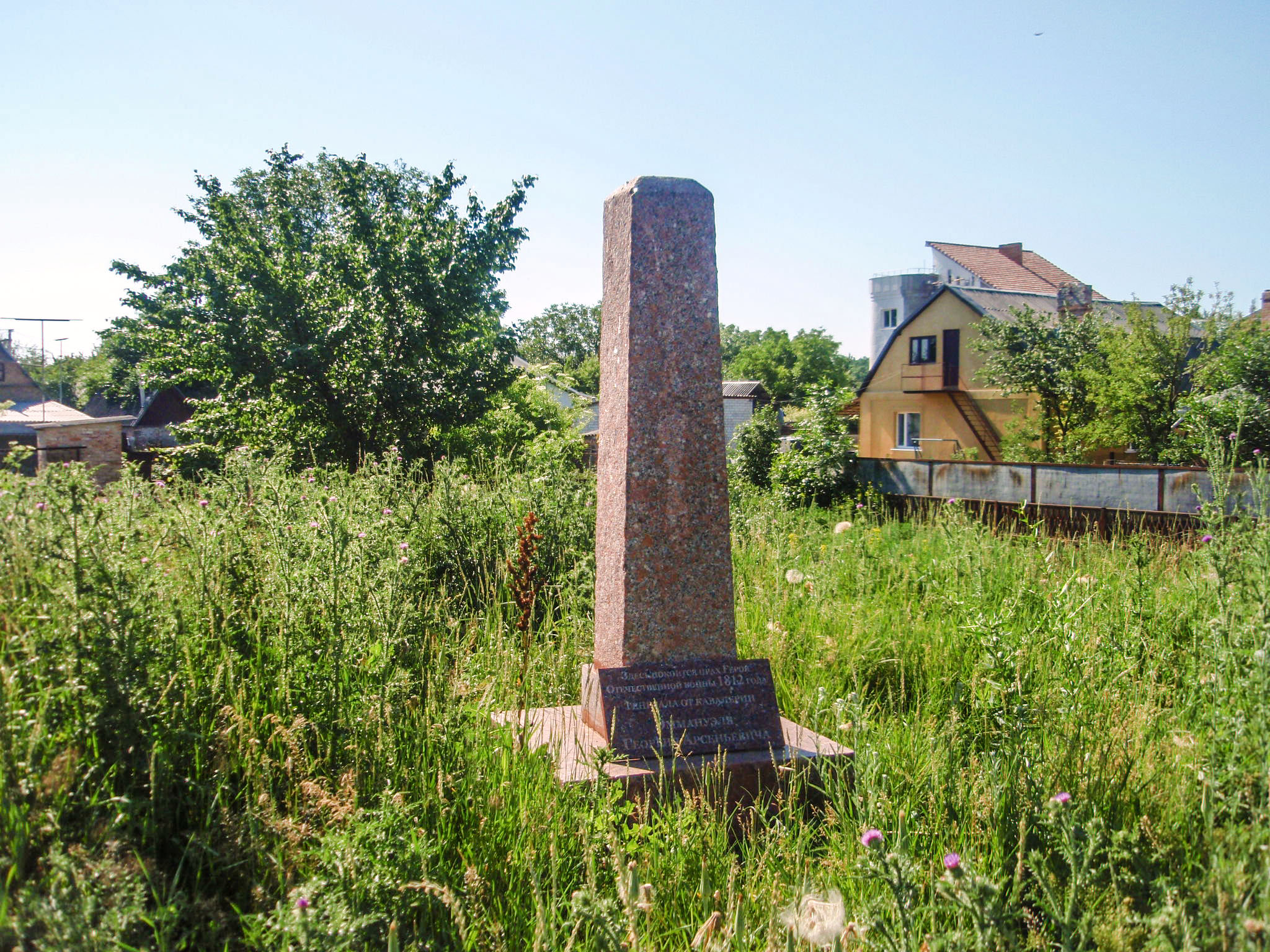
His grave in Kropyvnytskyi

== See also ==
- Peter Ivanovich Ivelich
- Andrei Miloradovich
- Avram Ratkov
- Jovan Horvat
- Nikolay Depreradovich
- Rajko Depreradović
- Jovan Šević
- Jovan Albanez
- Ivan Adamovich
- Ilya Duka
- Simeon Končarević
- Pavle Julinac
- Simeon Piščević
- Mikhail Miloradovich
- Semyon Zorich
- Peter Tekeli
- Marko Ivelich
- Nikolay Vuich
