= Mina Lazarević Nikšić =

Herzegovinian serdar

Mina Lazarević Nikšić (Serbian: Мина Лазаревић Никшић), also known by the pseudonym Mališa Bućić (Малиша Бућић), was a Herzegovinian serdar and delegate in Russia, representing Morača and the Serbs of the Sanjak of Herzegovina.

Nikšić was born in Trebjesa near Nikšić, and joined the hajduks (brigands), he was forced to take refuge in Ljevišta in Morača in 1791 from where he continued with brigandage. Nikšić travelled to St. Petersburg in 1794 with Morača archimandrite Aksentije Šundić. The Trebješani tribe revolted against the Ottomans and allied themselves with other tribes of Old Herzegovina and Brda in the 1790s. Nikšić joined Russian service and organized a colonist migration to Novorossiya of Serbs from Montenegro and Herzegovina. In 1803 Nikšić and obervajda Ovan Tjoti arrived at Odessa to scan the area for good settlements. Nikšić arrived at Odessa in 1804 with 97 people that were then settled in Tiraspol, where he received a great estate and 1,000 rubles. When the Russo-Turkish War broke out in 1806, Nikšić gathered a volunteer unit and reported to general Mihailo Miloradovich at Bucharest in November 1807.

A second migration of 16 families of Montenegrin Serbs came in May 1815 that at first lived beside Bulgarians, but were moved the next year to Nikšić's settlement.

== See also ==
- Sava Ljubiša (fl. 1798–d. 1842), Orthodox archimandrite and Montenegrin envoy to Russia
