= Yuryevo, Vologda Oblast =

Yuryevo Юрьево
- Village
- Location within Vologda Oblast Location within Russia
- Coordinates: 59°12′N 39°37′E
- Country: Russia
- Region: Vologda Oblast
- District: Vologodsky District
- Time zone: UTC+3:00

Yuryevo (Russian: Юрьево) is a rural locality (a village) in Leskovskoye Rural Settlement, Vologodsky District, Vologda Oblast, Russia. The population was 11 as of 2002.

== Geography ==
Yuryevo is located 18 km west of Vologda (the district's administrative centre) by road. Otradnoye is the nearest rural locality.
