= Avram Ratkov =

Imperial Russian general

Avram Petrovich Ratkov
- Born: 21 October 1773; Donbas, Russian Empire
- Died: December 26, 1829; Russia
- Military career
- Allegiance: Russian Empire
- Branch: Army
- Service years: 1783–1829
- Rank: Major General
- Units: Kazan Musketeer Regiment, 10th Infantry Division, Life Guards
- Conflicts: Napoleonic Wars
- Awards: Order of St. George; Order of St. Vladimir; Order of Saint Anna

Avram Petrovich Ratkov (Russian: Аврам Петрович Ратьков (21 October 1773 – 26 December 1829) was a Russian general of Serbian descent who participated in many battles, including the Battle of Borodino where he commanded the reserve military force with the rank of major general.

== Biography ==
He was a descendant of a Serbian Orthodox priest who settled in Russia in today's Donbas from the so-called Transcarpathian territories of the Habsburg monarchy's Military Frontier during the reign of Empress Catherine the Great. His biography states that he comes from nobles of Belozersk in Novgorod Governorate and that he entered the service on 1 January 1783 in the Revel Garrison Regiment.

On 10 November 1796, he was transferred to the famed Semyonovsky Regiment. That year (1796) Ratkov was awarded the Order of Saint Anna, 2nd degree, elevated to the rank of colonel and adjutant general for his past military services against the enemies of the Empire.

== Military career ==
After the Battle of Friedland in 1807, Ratkov was promoted major general (12 December 1807) and awarded the Order of Saint Vladimir, 4th class with a bow for bravery exhibited under fire in the major engagement between the French and Russian forces. Also, he was appointed chef of the Kazan Musketeer Regiment located in the Caucasus. On 11 November 1809, he took leave from the army for four years. On 10 November 1813, he accepted to serve in the military and remain in the Reserve Army as a major general. In 1814 he was with the divisional commander of the 10th Infantry Division in the Napoleonic Wars over the next couple of years until Napoleonic France was defeated.

He was appointed the commander of the 3rd Brigade of the 6th Infantry Division on 19 March 1816. In August 1822, he was appointed the commander of the 1st Garrison Battalion and Brigadier commander of the Life Guards, but two years later (27 July 1824), he was removed from the battalion command at his own request but remained in the post of the Brigade command of the Life Guards. In August 1826, he was awarded the Order of Saint Anna, 1st degree "For excellent, diligent, long-term service." In November 1826, he was awarded the Order of St. George, 4th class.

He died on 26 December 1829.

== Awards and decorations ==
- Order of Saint Anna, 2nd degree (9 November 1796)
- Order of Saint Vladimir, 4th degree with a bow (12 December 1807)
- Order of St. George, 4th class (26 November 1826)
- Order of Saint Anna, 1st degree (22 August 1826)

== Bibliography ==
Russian biographical dictionary in 25 volumes - Ed. under the supervision of the chairman of the Imperial Russian Historical Society A. A. Polovtsev. - St. Petersburg: Type. I. N. Skorokhodova, 1896–1918.
