= Pale of Settlement =

Jewish residents of the Russian Empire

Pale of Settlement черта оседлости (Russian) דער ייִדישער צעטייל־געגנט (Yiddish) תחום המושב (Hebrew)
- 1791–1917
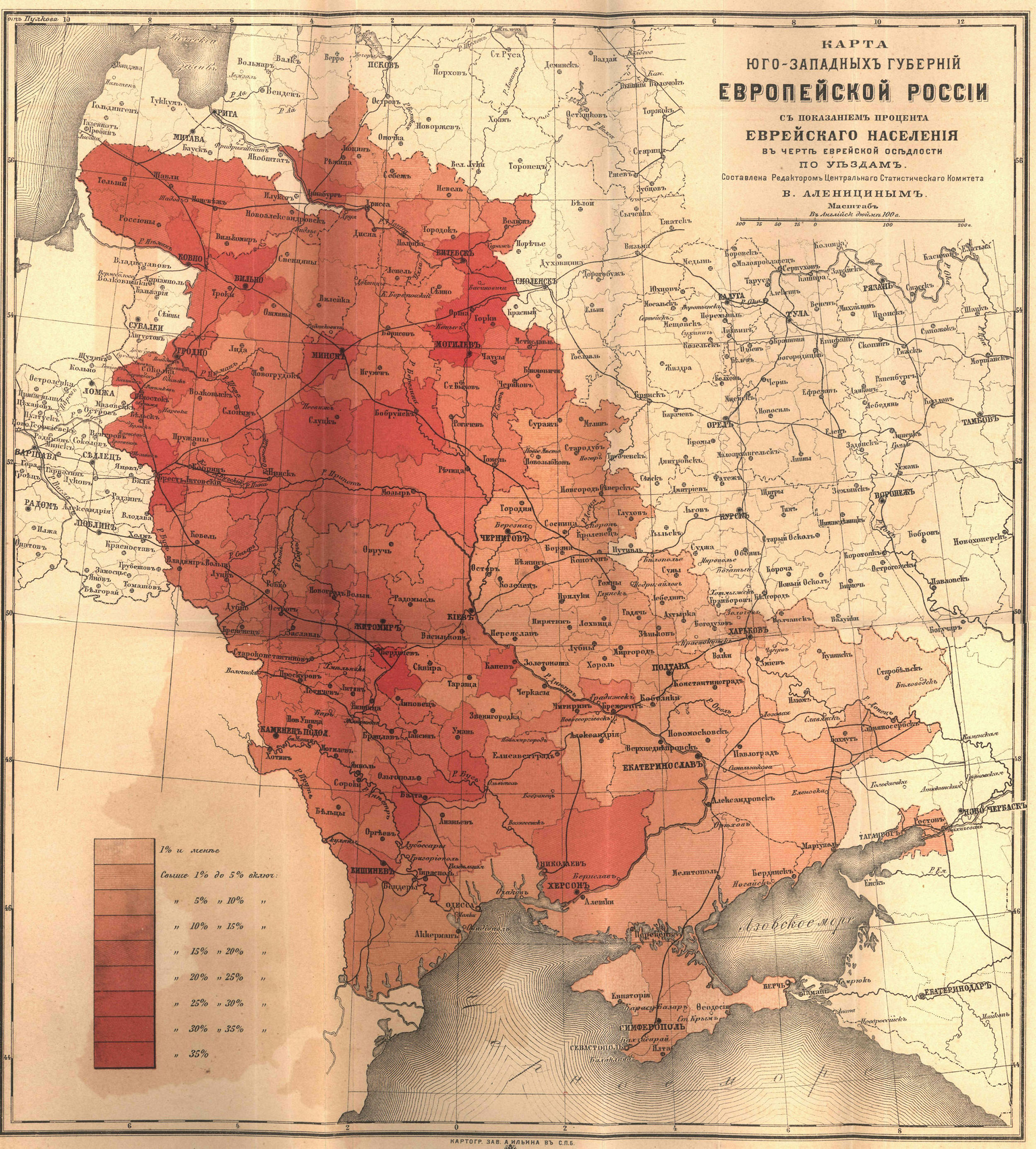
- Pale of Settlement map, showing the percentage of the Jewish population in 1884
- History
  - Established: 1791
  - Disestablished: 1917

The Pale of Settlement (Note: Russian: черта оседлости, romanized: cherta osedlosti; pre-reform spelling: черта осѣдлости, lit. 'boundary of settlement'; Yiddish: תּחום־המושבֿ, romanized: tkhum hamóyshev, lit. 'area of settlement' or ייִדישער תּחום, lit. 'Jewish area'; Hebrew: תְּחוּם הַמּוֹשָב, romanized: t'ẖum hammosháv, lit. 'area of settlement') was a western region of the Russian Empire with varying borders that existed from 1791 to 1917 in which permanent residency by Jewish subjects was allowed, and outside of which Jewish residency, permanent or temporary, was mostly forbidden. Most Jews were still excluded from residency in a number of cities within the Pale as well. A few Jews were allowed to live outside the area, including those with university education, members of the most affluent of the merchant guilds and particular artisans, some military personnel, and their dependents including families and sometimes servants. Pale is an archaic term meaning an enclosed area. Outside the Pale, Jews were also allowed to settle in certain colonies such as in Siberia.

The Pale of Settlement was established under the reign of Empress Catherine the Great (r. 1762–1796) after the First Partition of Poland (1772), when a significant Jewish population came under Russian rule, in order to hasten Russian settlement in Black Sea territories acquired from the Ottoman Empire. The Pale of Settlement included all of modern-day Belarus and Moldova, much of Lithuania, Ukraine and east-central Poland, and relatively small parts of Latvia and what is now the western Russian Federation. It extended from the eastern pale, or demarcation line inside the Russian Empire, westwards to the border with the Kingdom of Prussia (later the German Empire) and Austria-Hungary. It comprised about 20% of the territory of European Russia and largely corresponded to historical lands of the former Polish–Lithuanian Commonwealth, Cossack Hetmanate, Ottoman Empire (with Yedisan), Crimean Khanate, and eastern Moldavia (Bessarabia).

Life in the Pale for many was economically bleak. Most people relied on small service or artisan work that could not support the number of inhabitants, which resulted in emigration, especially in the late 19th century. Even so, Jewish culture, especially Yiddish, developed in the shtetls (small towns), intellectual culture developed in the yeshivas (religious schools), and it was also carried abroad.

The Russian Empire during the existence of the Pale was predominantly Orthodox Christian, in contrast to the Pale with its large minorities of Jewish, Roman Catholic, and, until mid-19th century, Eastern Catholic population (although much of modern Ukraine, Belarus and Moldova are predominantly Eastern Orthodox). While the religious nature of the edicts governing the Pale is clear (conversion to Russian Orthodoxy, the state religion, released individuals from the strictures), historians argue that the motivations for its creation and maintenance were primarily economic and nationalist in nature.

The end of the enforcement and formal demarcation of the Pale coincided with the beginning of World War I in 1914, when large numbers of Jews fled into the Russian interior to escape the invading Imperial German Army. It officially ended in 1917 after the February Revolution and end of the Russian Empire.

== Etymology ==
Pale of Settlement was an 1890s English translation of the Russian черта оседлости čerta osedlosti (Note: OED only provides transliteration for the etymon. The etymon itself should be черта осѣдлости due to it being attested prior to specific orthographic reforms removing the letter ѣ (Yat), producing черта оседлости.) (lit. 'boundary of settlement'). The English pale, with the archaic meaning "a district or territory within determined bounds, or subject to a particular jurisdiction", dates back to the 1540s when it was used to describe things like the English jurisdiction of Ireland and of France. By extension, the Pale is also shorthand for the Pale of Settlement.

In Yiddish, it is referred to as the area of shtetl, or in Hebrew of moshav.

== History ==
The Russian Empire did not rule over a significant Jewish population until the territory that would become the Pale first began to enter Imperial Russian hands in 1772 with the First Partition of Poland. At the time, most Jews (and in fact most imperial subjects) were restricted in their movements. The Pale came into being under the rule of Catherine the Great in 1791, initially as a measure to speed colonization of territory on the Black Sea recently acquired from the Ottoman Empire. Jews were allowed to expand the territory available to them, but in exchange, Jewish merchants could no longer do business in the Russian interior.

The institution of the Pale became more significant following the Second Partition of Poland in 1793 because, until then, the empire's Jewish population had been rather limited. The dramatic westward expansion of the Russian Empire through the annexation of Polish–Lithuanian territory substantially increased the Jewish population. At its height, the Pale had a Jewish population of over five million and represented the largest component (40 percent) of the world's Jewish population at that time. The freedom of movement of non-Jewish imperial subjects was greatly increased, but the freedom of movement of Jews was greatly restricted and officially kept within the boundaries of the pale.

The name "Pale of Settlement" first arose under the rule of Tsar Nicholas I. Under his rule (1825 to 1855), the Pale gradually shrank and became more restrictive. In 1827, Jews living in Kiev were severely restricted by imperial decree. In 1835 the provinces of Astrakhan and the North Caucasus were removed from the Pale. Nicholas tried to remove all Jews from within 80 kilometres (50 mi) of the Austrian Empire's border in 1843. In practice, this was very difficult to enforce, and the restrictions were lessened in 1858.

Tsar Alexander II, who ruled 1855 to 1881, expanded the rights of rich and educated Jews to leave and live beyond the Pale, which led many Jews to believe that the Pale might soon be abolished. These hopes vanished when Alexander II was assassinated in 1881. Rumors spread that he had been assassinated by Jews, and in the aftermath anti-Jewish sentiment skyrocketed. Anti-Jewish pogroms rocked the country from 1881 through 1884. The reactionary temporary regulations regarding the Jews of 1881 prohibited any new Jewish settlement outside of the Pale. The laws also granted peasants the right to demand the expulsion of Jews in their towns. The laws were anything but temporary, and would be in full effect until at least 1903. In 1910, Jewish members of the State Duma proposed the abolition of the Pale, but the power dynamic of Duma meant that the bill never had a realistic chance to pass. Far-right political elements in the Duma responded by proposing that all Jews be expelled from the Russian Empire.

At times, by imperial decree Jews were forbidden to live in agricultural communities, or certain cities, (as in Kiev, Sevastopol, and Yalta), and were forced to move to small provincial towns, thus fostering the rise of the shtetls. Jewish merchants of the First Guild (купцы первой гильдии, the wealthiest sosloviye of merchants in the Russian Empire), people with higher or special education, university students, artisans, army tailors, ennobled Jews, soldiers (drafted in accordance with the Recruit Charter of 1810), and their families had the right to live outside the Pale of Settlement. In some periods, special dispensations were given for Jews to live in the major imperial cities, but these were tenuous, and several thousand Jews were expelled to the Pale from Moscow as late as 1891. The extremely restrictive decrees and recurrent pogroms led to much emigration from the Pale, mainly to the United States and Western Europe. However, emigration could not keep up with birth rates and expulsion of Jews from other parts of the Russian Empire, and thus the Jewish population of the Pale continued to grow.

During World War I, the Pale lost its rigid hold on the Jewish population when large numbers of Jews fled into the Russian interior to escape the invading German army. The Pale of Settlement de facto ceased to exist on 19 August 1915, when the administrator of the Ministry of Internal Affairs allowed, in view of the emergency circumstances of wartime, the residence of Jews in urban settlements outside the Pale of Settlement, with the exception of capitals and localities under the jurisdiction of the ministers of the imperial court and the military (that is, palace suburbs of Petrograd and the frontline). The Pale formally came to an end soon after the abdication of Nicholas II, and as revolution gripped Russia. On 20 March (2 April N.S.), 1917, the Pale was abolished by the Russian Provisional Government decree, On the abolition of religious and national restrictions. The Second Polish Republic was reconstituted from much of the former territory of the Pale in the aftermath of World War I. Subsequently, most of the Jewish population of the area would perish in the Holocaust one generation later.

== Jewish life in the Pale ==
Geographic distribution of Jewish languages (such as Yiddish) in the Russian Empire according to 1897 census. The Pale of Settlement can be seen in the west, top left.

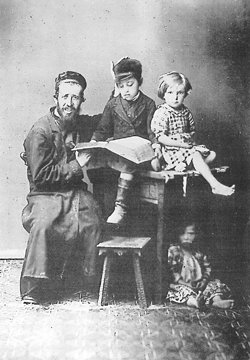
A melamed (Jewish teacher) in 19th century Podolia

Jewish life in the shtetls (Yiddish: שטעטלעך, shtetlekh, "little towns") of the Pale of Settlement was hard and poverty-stricken. Following the Jewish religious tradition of tzedakah (charity), a sophisticated system of volunteer Jewish social welfare organizations developed to meet the needs of the population. Various organizations supplied clothes to poor students, provided kosher food to Jewish soldiers conscripted into the Imperial Russian Army, dispensed free medical treatment for the poor, offered dowries and household gifts to destitute brides, and arranged for technical education for orphans. According to historian Martin Gilbert's Atlas of Jewish History, no province in the Pale had less than 14% of Jews on relief; Lithuanian and Ukrainian Jews supported as much as 22% of their poor populations.

The concentration of Jews in the Pale, coupled with Tsar Alexander III's "fierce hatred of the Jews", and the rumors that Jews had been involved in the assassination of his father, Alexander II, made them easy targets for pogroms and anti-Jewish riots by the majority population. These, along with the repressive May Laws, often devastated whole communities. Though attacks occurred throughout the existence of the Pale, particularly devastating Russian pogroms occurred from 1881 to 1883 and from 1903 to 1906, targeting hundreds of communities, assaulting thousands of Jews, and causing considerable property damage.

Jews typically could not engage in agriculture due to restrictions on Jews owning land and farming in the Pale, and were thus predominantly merchants, artisans, and shopkeepers. This made poverty a serious issue among the Jews. However, a robust Jewish community welfare system arose; by the end of the 19th century nearly 1 in 3 Jews in the Pale were being supported by Jewish welfare organizations. This Jewish support system included, but was not limited to, providing free medicine to the poor, giving dowries to poor brides, kosher food to Jewish soldiers, and education to orphans.

One outgrowth of the concentration of Jews in a circumscribed area was the development of the modern yeshiva system. Prior to the Pale, schools to study the Talmud were a luxury. This began to change when the rabbi Chaim of Volozhin began a sort of national-level yeshiva. In 1803, he founded the Volozhin Yeshiva and began to attract large number of students from around the Pale. The Tsarist authorities were not pleased with the school and sought to make it more secular, eventually closing it in 1879. The authorities re-opened it in 1881, but required all teachers to have diplomas from Russian institutions and to teach Russian language and culture. This requirement was not only untenable to the Jews, but essentially impossible, and the school closed for the last time in 1892. Regardless, the school had great impact: its students went on to form many new yeshivas in the Pale, and reignited the study of the Talmud in Russia.

After 1886, the Jewish quota was applied to education, with the percentage of Jewish students limited to no more than 10% within the Pale, 5% outside the Pale and 3% in the capitals of Moscow, St. Petersburg, and Kiev. The quotas in the capitals, however, were increased slightly in 1908 and 1915.

Amid the difficult conditions in which the Jewish population lived and worked, the courts of Hasidic dynasties flourished in the Pale. Thousands of followers of rebbes such as the Gerrer Rebbe Yehudah Aryeh Leib Alter (known as the Sfas Emes), the Chernobyler Rebbe, and the Vizhnitzer Rebbe flocked to their towns for the Jewish holidays and followed their rebbes' minhagim (Hebrew: מנהגים, Jewish practices) in their own homes.

The tribulations of Jewish life in the Pale of Settlement were immortalized in the writings of Yiddish authors such as humorist Sholem Aleichem, whose novel Tevye der Milkhiger (Yiddish: טבֿיה דער מילכיקער, Tevye the Milkman, in the form of the narration of Tevye from a fictional shtetl of Anatevka to the author) forms the basis of the theatrical (and subsequent film) production Fiddler on the Roof. Because of the harsh conditions of day-to-day life in the Pale, some two million Jews emigrated from there between 1881 and 1914, mainly to the United States.

In 1912–1914, S. An-sky led the Jewish Ethnographic Expedition to the Pale, which visited around 70 shtetls in Volhynia, Podolia, and Galicia, gathering folk stories and artifacts, recording music, and making photos, as an attempt to preserve and salvage traditional Ashkenazic culture that was vanishing because of modernization, pogroms, and emigration.

== Territories of the Pale ==
The Pale of Settlement included the following areas.

=== 1791 ===
The ukase of Catherine the Great of 23 December 1791 limited the Pale to:

- Western Krai:
  - Mogilev Governorate
  - Polotsk Governorate (later reorganized into Vitebsk Governorate)
- Little Russia (Ukraine):
  - Kiev Governorate
  - Chernigov Governorate
  - Novgorod-Seversky Viceroyalty (later became Poltava Governorate)
- Novorossiya Governorate
  - Yekaterinoslav Viceroyalty
  - Taurida Oblast (Crimea)

=== 1794 ===
After the Second Partition of Poland, the ukase of 23 June 1794, the following areas were added:

- Minsk Governorate
- Mogilev Governorate
- Polotsk Governorate
- Kiev Governorate
- Volhynian Governorate
- Podolia Governorate

=== 1795 ===
After the Third Partition of Poland, the following areas were added:

- Vilna Governorate
- Grodno Governorate

=== 1805–1835 ===
After 1805 the Pale gradually shrank, and became limited to the following areas:

- Lithuanian governorates
- Southwestern Krai
- Belarus without rural areas
- Malorossiya (Little Russia or Ukraine) without rural areas
- Chernigov Governorate
- Novorossiya without Nikolaev and Sevastopol
- Kiev Governorate without Kiev
- Baltic governorates closed for arriving Jews

Rural areas for 50 versts (53 km) from the western border were closed for new settlement of the Jews.

=== After 1836 ===
- Chernigov Governorate, Poltava Governorate, Taurida Governorate (Crimea), Kherson Governorate, Bessarabia Governorate, Velizh Governorate.
- Northwest Territories (Lithuania and Belarus): Vilnius, Kaunas, Grodno, Minsk, Mogilev, Vitebsk governorates.
- Southwestern Krai (Ukraine): Kiev, Volhynian Governorates.
- Kingdom of Poland: Warsaw, Lublin, Płock, Kalisz, Piotrków, Kielce, Radom, Siedlce, Augustów gubernias (divided into Suwałki and Łomża in 1867).

In 1917, Congress Poland did not belong to the Pale of Settlement but Jews were allowed to settle there.

=== Final demographics ===
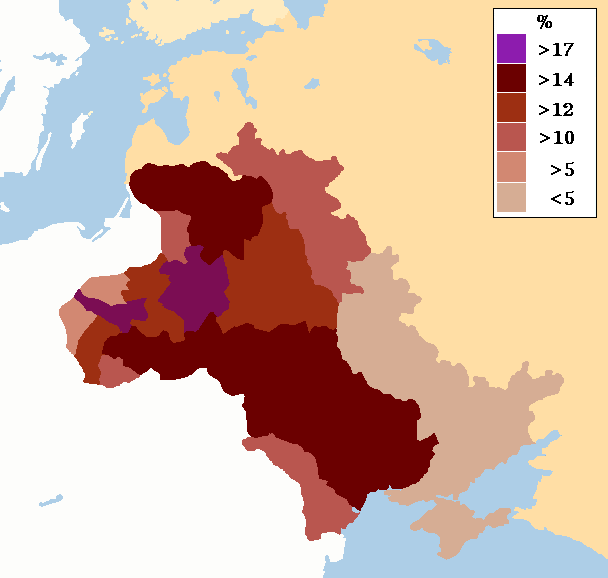
The Pale of Settlement and Congress Poland, with the percentages of Jewish population c. 1905

According to the 1897 census, the governates or guberniyas had the following percentages of Jews:

Region	%
Northwestern Krai (whole Lithuania, Belarus)
Vilna	12.86%
Kovno	13.77%
Grodno	17.49%
Minsk	16.06%
Mogilyov	12.09%
Vitebsk	11.79%
Southwestern Krai (North & Central Ukraine)
Kiev	12.19%
Volhynia	13.24%
Podolia	12.28%
Congress Poland
Warsaw	18.22%
Lublin	13.46%
Płock	9.29%
Kalisz	8.52%
Piotrków	15.85%
Kielce	10.92%
Radom	13.78%
Siedlce	15.69%
Suwałki	10.16%
Łomża	15.77%
Others
Chernigov	4.98%
Poltava	3.99%
Taurida (Crimea)	4.20% + Karaite 0.43%
Kherson	12.43%
Bessarabia	11.81%
Yekaterinoslav	4.78%

In 1882, it was forbidden for Jews to settle in rural areas.

The following cities within the Pale were excluded from it:

- Kiev
- Nikolaev
- Sevastopol
- Yalta

== In popular culture ==
- Fiddler on the Roof, which was later adapted into a film, was located in the Pale of 1905 in the fictional town of Anatevka, Ukraine.
- Yentl, also adapted into a film, was located in the Pale of 1873 Poland.
- Some novels of Isaac Bashevis Singer take place in the Pale.

== See also ==
- Antisemitism in the Russian Empire
- Antisemitism in Ukraine
- Eastern European Jewry
- History of the Jews in Belarus
- History of the Jews in Lithuania
- History of the Jews in Poland
- History of the Jews in Russia
- History of the Jews in Ukraine
- Jewish Autonomous Oblast, eastern Russian territory for Jews
- The Pale (English Pale) around Dublin, Ireland
- Pale of Calais, English territory in France from 1360 to 1558
