= New Serbia =

New Serbia or Nova Srbija may refer to:

- New Serbia (political party), established in 1998
- New Serbia (historical province), in the 18th century Russian Empire

== See also ==
- Serbia (disambiguation)
- Serbian (disambiguation)
