= Srpska =

Srpska, meaning "Serbian" in Serbian, may refer to:

- Republika Srpska, one of the two major entities of Bosnia and Herzegovina, a country in southeastern Europe
  - Republika Srpska (1992–1995), as it existed during the Bosnian War
- Serbia, a country in southeastern Europe
- Serbian republic (disambiguation), the translation of the name of several Serbian administrations, most in northern and southeastern Bosnia
- Srpska, Montenegro, a village near Podgorica, the capital of Montenegro
- Srpska: The Struggle for Freedom, a 2022 documentary film
