= Old Serbian =

Old Serbian may refer to:

- someone or something related to the Old Serbia, a historical region
- Old Serbian language, a general term for the pre-modern variants of Serbian language, including:
  - the Serbian recension of Old Church Slavonic language
  - the Slavo-Serbian language, an early modern variant of Serbian language
- Old Serbian Cyrillic alphabet, a general term for the pre-modern variants of Serbian Cyrillic alphabet

== See also ==
- Serbia (disambiguation)
- Serbian (disambiguation)
- Serbians
- Old Croatian (disambiguation)
