= Azov Governorate =

1775–1783 unit of Russia

Coordinates: 47°06′N 39°25′E

Azov Governorate Азовская губерния (Russian)
- Governorate of the Russian Empire
- 1775–1783
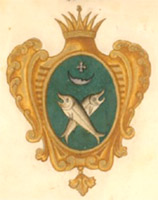
- Coat of arms

- History
  - Established: 1775
  - Disestablished: 1783
Preceded by	Succeeded by
Belgorod razryad; Don Host Land	Voronezh Governorate
- Today part of: Ukraine; Russia

Azov Governorate (Russian: Азовская губерния, romanized: Azovskaya guberniya) was an administrative-territorial unit (guberniya) of the Russian Empire, which existed from 1775 to 1783. Its capital was in Belyov Fortress and later in Yekaterinoslav.

== Geography and history ==
Azov Governorate was located in the northeastern Azov littoral region and covered only the southern half of the previously existing Azov Governorate of 1708–25. The new division was created from the southern Bakhmut Province of Voronezh Governorate and the self-governed frontier region of Slavo-Serbia, but primarily it was based on the recently created and quickly liquidated lands of the Don Host. Some of the lands of the Azov Governorate had been acquired by Russia from the Ottoman Empire per the terms of the Treaty of Küçük Kaynarca (signed in 1774) that were lost in 1711 due to the Pruth River Campaign in the Romanian region. In terms of the modern administrative division of Russia, the southern part of Rostov Oblast was part of the second Azov Governorate. In terms of modern Ukraine, most of East Ukraine was part of the Azov Governorate.

To the west it bordered the Novorossiysk Governorate (Kremenchug) created out of the recently liquidated Zaporizhian Sich, to the south - the Azov Sea and the Kuban region (under the suzerainty of Crimean Khanate), to the northwest - the Sloboda Ukraine Governorate (Kharkov), to the north - the Voronezh Governorate, and to the east - the Astrakhan Governorate. The Azov Governorate was also in charge of a number of fortresses around the Crimean peninsula that Russia received from Ottoman Empire and the city of Kerch which controls the Strait of Kerch and access to the Black Sea.

=== Included territories ===
In 1775:

- lands: Bakhmut Province (including Slavo-Serbia) and portions of the Don Host Oblast
- fortresses: Saint Demetrius (today part of Rostov-on-Don), Yeni-Kale, Tor (Sloviansk with adjacent lands), and Kinburn (including the Ochakov steppe, former Prohnoyivska palanka)
- cities: Taganrog and Kerch
- New Dnieper Line (fortification line)

1776:

- Yekaterine Province from Novorossiysk Governorate
- the autonomous administration in Slavo-Serbia was discontinued

Beginning around the 1780s, the Azov Governorate was divided into counties (uyezd). The governorate was divided into two provinces, Yekaterine and Bakhmut which in turn were divided into a total of nine uyezds.

In less than ten years the government of Azov once again was liquidated after it was merged along with the Novorossiysk Governorate into the Vice-royalty of Yekaterinoslav in 1783.

=== List of uyezds ===
- Novomoskovsky Uyezd (Yekaterinoslavsky)
- Alexandrovsky Uyezd
- Pavlogradsky Uyezd (Pavlovsky)
- Mariupolsky Uyezd
- Konstantinogradsky Uyezd
- Taganrogsky Uyezd
- Bakhmutsky Uyezd
- Slovyansky Uyezd
- Tsarychansky Uyezd

== Administration ==
The Azov Government along with Novorossiysk, Astrakhan, and Saratov governments united under the Potyomkin's Novorossiysk General Government

- 1775-1779 Grigory Potemkin

The administration of the governorate was performed by a governor. The governors of the second Azov Governorate were

- 1775–1781 Vasily Alexeyevich Chertkov;
- 1781-? Georgy Gavrilovich Gersevanov.

== Nationality ==
- By the Imperial census of 1778.

Nationality	Number	(%)	males	females
Ukrainians	136,906	61.31	75,338	61,568
Russians	45,812	20.51	24,236	21,576
Greeks	16,370	7.33	9,016	7,354
Armenians	13,702	6.14	6,952	6,750
Romanians (including Moldavians)	5,623	2.52	2,957	2,666
Serbians	1,040	0.47	592	448
Georgians	807	0.36	660	147
Poles	765	0.34	517	248
Other	745	0.33	472	273
Total	223,314	100	121,319	101,995
Previously (prior to Azov Governorate creation)	154,657	69.26	83,032	71,625
