= Bakhmut Province =

Province in Russian Empire

Bakhmut Province (Ukrainian: Бахмутська провінція) was an administrative division (a province) of the Russian Empire. Its administrative center was Bakhmut. It was created in 1719 and abolished in 1783.

In 1719, it was formed. It was part of the First Azov Governorate. During this time, in addition to Bakhmut, it contained Borivske, Krasnianske, Novoaidar, Raihorodok, Staryi Aidar Sukhariv, and Yampil. After the name of Azov Governorate was changed to Voronezh Governorate, Tor (Sloviansk) and Sokolsk (Lipetsk) were added to its territory, among other minor settlements.

In 1765, it was transferred to Novorossiya Governorate. It contained the Bakhmut hussar regiment, the Samara hussar regiment, and the Luhansk pike regiment.

After a rebellion, a new Azov Governorate was created, with Bakhmut Province becoming part of it. During this time, the territory of the province included Bakhmut uezd and Slavo-Serbia.

It was abolished in 1783 in accordance with the abolition of all provinces of the Russian Empire.
