= Kingdom of Serbia (disambiguation) =

Kingdom of Serbia may refer to:

- Kingdom of Serbia (medieval), a Serbian kingdom during the 13th and 14th centuries
- Realm of Stefan Dragutin, the northern Serbian kingdom of 1282–1325
- Lordship of Prilep, the southern Serbian kingdom of Marko Vukašinović (1371–1395)
- Kingdom of Serbia (1718–1739), a Habsburg province in central Serbia
- Kingdom of Serbia, the Serbian state from 1882 to 1918

== See also ==
- Serbia (disambiguation)
- Principality of Serbia (disambiguation)
- Republic of Serbia (disambiguation)
