= Yekaterinoslav Province =

Province in the Russian Empire (1764–1775)

Yekaterinoslav Province (Russian: Екатерининская провинция; Ukrainian: Катерининська провінція) was a province of Novorossiya Governorate in the Russian Empire, with its center in the Bilevska fortress (today Krasnohrad, Ukraine). It was formed in 1764.

It included the Ukrainian line and the Slavo-Serbia colony in its territory.

In 1775, the province was abolished along with the rest of the system of dividing governorates into provinces. Today, the former area of Yekaterinoslav Province is included in modern-day Kharkiv Oblast, Dnipropetrovsk Oblast, and Donetsk Oblast of Ukraine.
