= Vukan of Serbia =

Vukan of Serbia may refer to:

- Vukan I of Serbia, founder of the Vukanović dynasty, Grand Prince of Serbia from 1080 to 1112
- Vukan II of Serbia, from the Nemanjić dynasty, Grand Prince of Serbia from 1202 to 1204

== See also ==
- Principality of Serbia (disambiguation)
