= Serbian republic =

Serbian republic or Serb republic may refer to:

- Serbia or Republika Srbija, a country in Southeastern Europe, and the nation-state of the Serbs
  - Socialist Republic of Serbia or Socijalistička Republika Srbija, a federal unit of the Socialist Federal Republic of Yugoslavia, from 1944 to 1992
  - Republic of Serbia (1992–2006) or Republika Srbija, a federal unit of the Federal Republic of Yugoslavia from 1992 to 2003, and of the State Union Serbia and Montenegro from 2003 to 2006
- Republika Srpska or "Serb Republic", the Serb entity of Bosnia and Herzegovina in its current form
  - Republika Srpska (1992–1995) or "Serb Republic", the unrecognized Serb entity of Bosnia and Herzegovina from 1992 to 1995
- Republic of Serbian Krajina or Republika Srpska Krajina, war-time Serb breakaway republic in Croatia from 1991 to 1995

== See also ==
- Serbia (disambiguation)
- Serbian (disambiguation)
- Srpska (disambiguation)
