= Novorossiya =

Territory of the Russian Empire (1764–1917)

Coordinates: 47.5°N 34.5°E

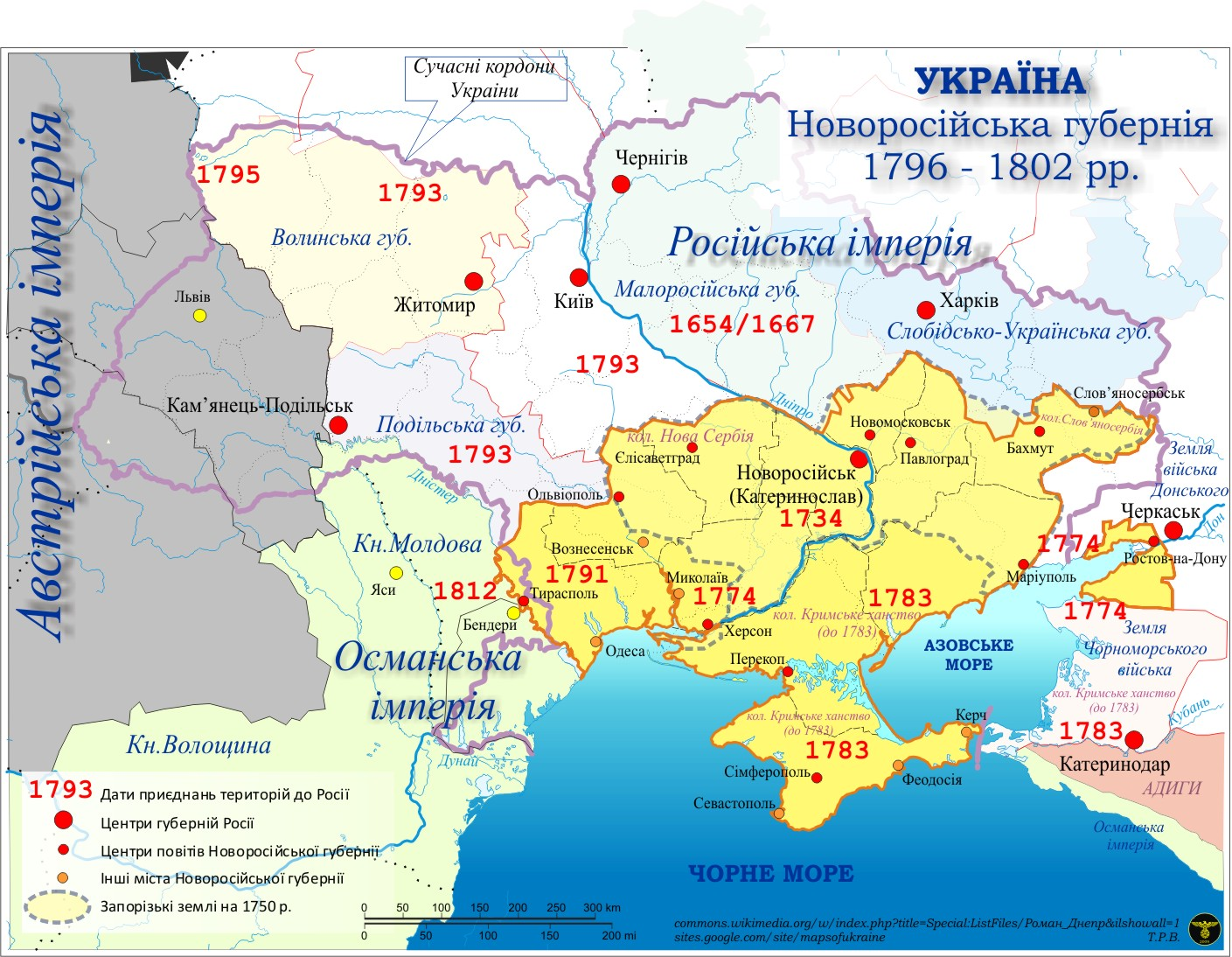
Novorossiya Governorate in 1800 within the Russian Empire. Its central city was Ekaterinoslav (modern Dnipro), which was briefly renamed "Novorossiysk" during the reign of Paul I

Novorossiya (Note: lit. "New Russia"; Russian: Новороссия, romanized: Novorossiya, IPA: [nəvɐˈrosʲːɪjə]; Ukrainian: Новоросія, romanized: Novorosiia, IPA: [nowoˈrɔs⁽ʲ⁾ijɐ]; Romanian: Novorusia or Noua Rusie; Polish: Noworosja.) is a historical name, used during the era of the Russian Empire for an administrative area that later became the southern mainland of Ukraine: the region immediately north of the Black Sea and Crimea. The name Novorossiya, which means "New Russia", entered official usage in 1764, after the Russian Empire conquered the Crimean Khanate, and annexed its territories, when Novorossiya Governorate (or Province) was founded. Official usage of the name ceased after 1917, when the entire area (minus Crimea) was annexed by the Ukrainian People's Republic, precursor of the Ukrainian SSR.

Novorossiya Governorate was formed in 1764 from military frontier regions and parts of the southern Hetmanate, in anticipation of a war with the Ottoman Empire. It was further expanded by the annexation of the Zaporozhian Sich in 1775. At various times, Novorossiya encompassed the modern Ukraine's regions of the Black Sea littoral (Prychornomoria), Zaporizhzhia, Tavria, the Azov Sea littoral (Pryazovia), the Tatar region of Crimea, the area around the Kuban River, and the Circassian lands.

== History ==
=== Before the 18th century ===
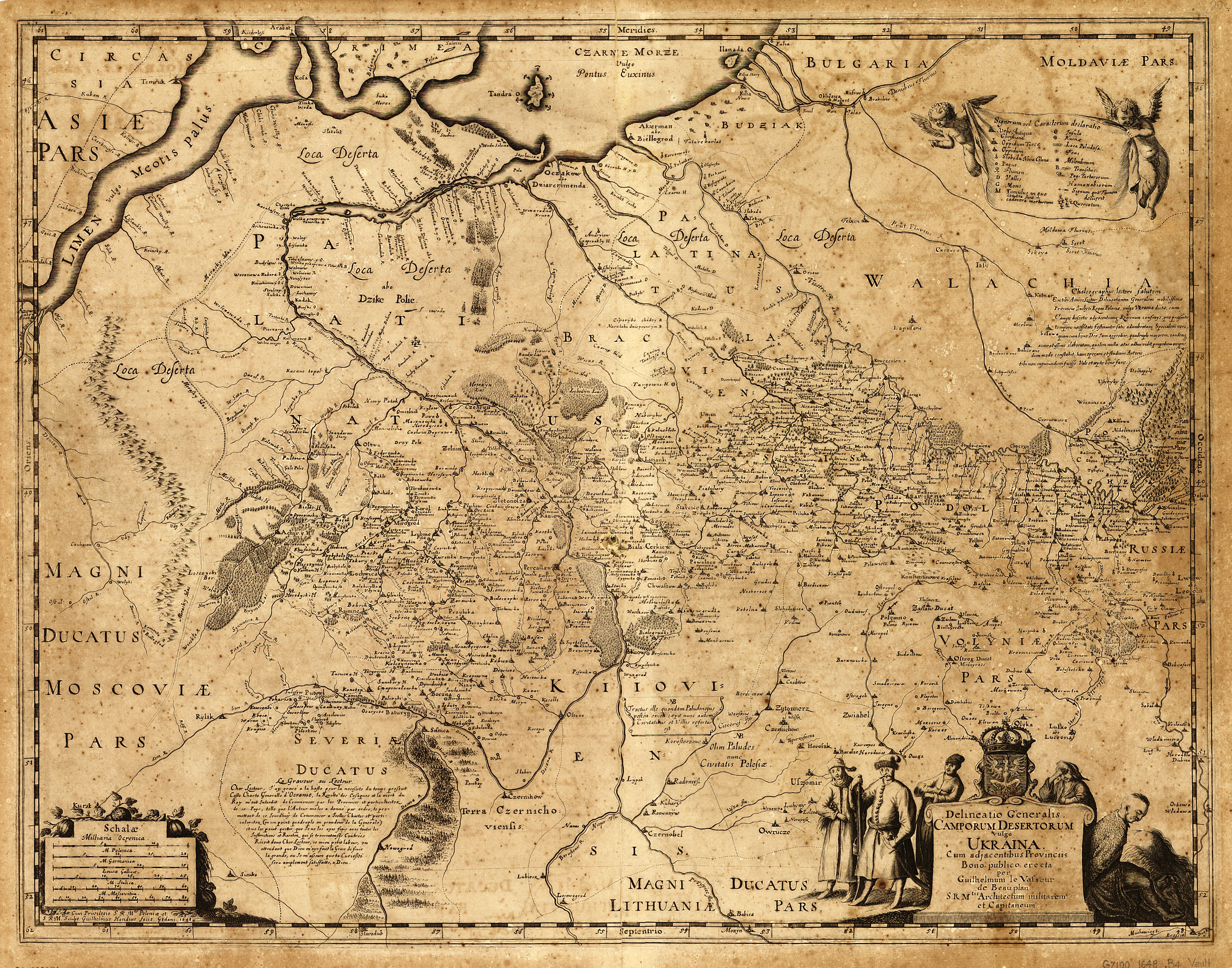
Ukraine 1648 (south at top) with a broad belt of loca deserta (Latin for 'desolated areas')

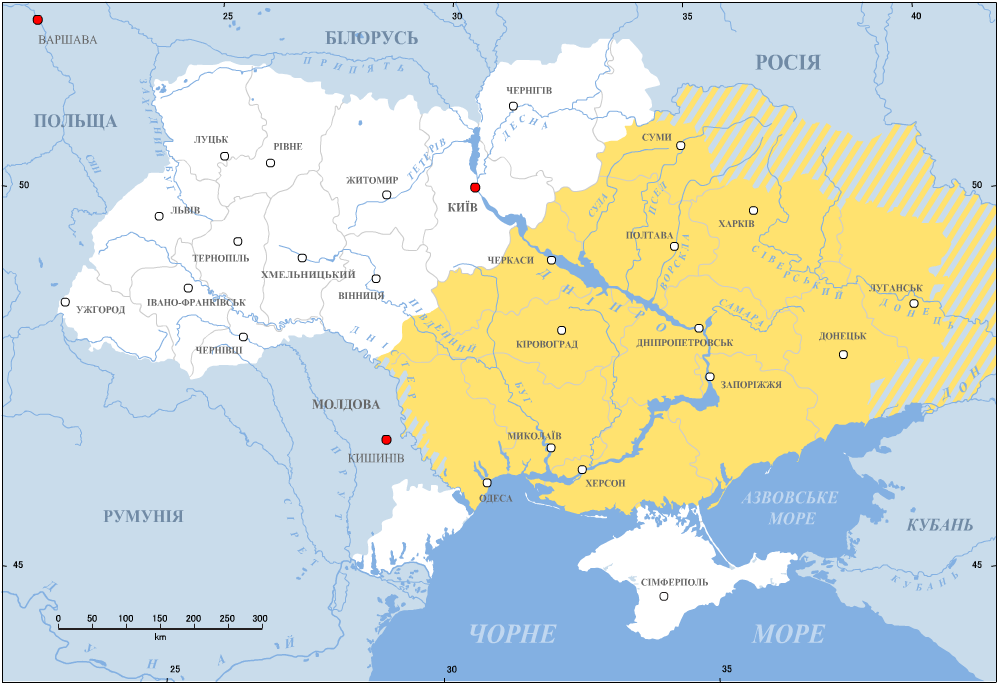
Map of the Wild Fields in the 17th century

The modern history of the region follows the fall of the Golden Horde. The eastern portion was claimed by the Crimean Khanate (one of its multiple successors), while its western regions were divided between Moldavia and Lithuania. With the expansion of the Ottoman Empire, the whole Black Sea northern littoral region came under the control of the Crimean Khanate that in turn became a vassal of the Ottomans. Sometime in the 16th century the Crimean Khanate allowed the Nogai Horde, which were displaced from its native Volga region by Muscovites and Kalmyks, to settle in the Black Sea steppes.

Vast regions to the North of the Black Sea were sparsely populated and were known on medieval maps as loca deserta (Latin for 'Desolated Places'), Wild Fields (as translated from Polish or Ukrainian), or Dykra (in Lithuanian). There were, however, many settlements along the Dnieper River. The Wild Fields had covered roughly the southern territories of modern Ukraine; some say they extended into the modern Southern Russia (Rostov Oblast).

=== Russian Empire (1764–1917) ===
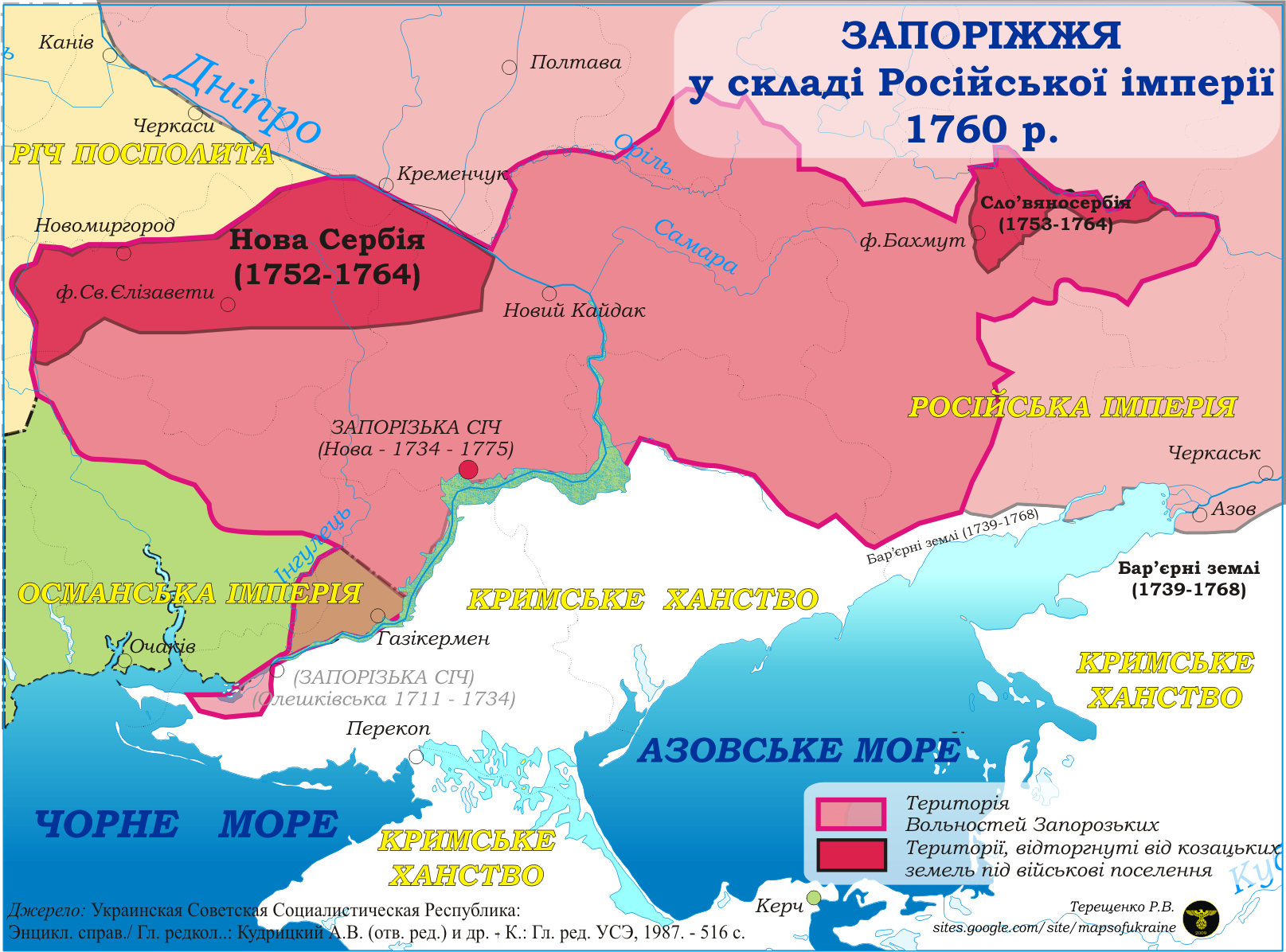
Lands of Zaporizhian Host in 1760

The Russian Empire gradually gained control over the area, signing peace treaties with the Cossack Hetmanate and with the Ottoman Empire at the conclusion of the Russo-Turkish Wars of 1735–39, 1768–74, 1787–92 and 1806–12. In 1764 the Russian Empire established the Novorossiysk Governorate; it was originally to be named after the Empress Catherine, but she decreed that it should be called New Russia instead. Imperial Russia's view of New Russia was described in 2006 by the historian Willard Sunderland:

The old steppe was Asian and stateless; the current one was state-determined and claimed for European-Russian civilization. The world of comparison was now even more obviously that of the Western empires. Consequently it was all the more clear that the Russian empire merited its own New Russia to go along with everyone else's New Spain, New France, and New England. The adoption of the name of New Russia was in fact the most powerful statement imaginable of Russia's national coming of age.

The administrative center of the Novorossiysk Governorate was at the Fortress of St. Elizabeth (today in Kropyvnytskyi) in order to protect the southern borderlands from the Ottoman Empire, and in 1765 this passed to Kremenchuk.

After the annexation of the Ottoman territories to Novorossiya in 1774, the Russian authorities commenced a broad program of colonization, encouraging large migrations from a broader spectrum of ethnic groups. Catherine the Great invited European settlers to these newly conquered lands: Romanians (from Moldavia, Wallachia and Transylvania), Bulgarians, Serbs, Greeks, Albanians, Germans, Poles, Italians, and others. Catherine the Great granted Prince Grigori Potemkin (1739–1791) the powers of an absolute ruler over the area from 1774, after which he directed the Russian colonization of the land. The rulers of Novorossiya gave out land generously to the Russian nobility (dvoryanstvo) and the enserfed peasantry—mostly from Ukraine and fewer from Russia—to encourage immigration for the cultivation of the then sparsely populated steppe. According to the Historical Dictionary of Ukraine:

The population consisted of military colonists from hussar and lancer regiments, Ukrainian and Russian peasants, Cossacks, Serbs, Montenegrins, Hungarians, and other foreigners who received land subsidies for settling in the area.

In 1775, the Russian Empress Catherine the Great forcefully liquidated the Zaporizhian Sich and annexed its territory to Novorossiya, thus eliminating the independent rule of the Ukrainian Cossacks. The governorate was dissolved in 1783. In 1792, the Russian government declared that the region between the Dniester and the Bug was to become a new principality named "New Moldavia", under Russian suzerainty. According to the first Russian census of the Yedisan region conducted in 1793 (after the expulsion of the Nogai Tatars) 49 villages out of 67 between the Dniester and the Southern Bug were Romanian. From 1796 to 1802 Novorossiya was the name of the reestablished Governorate with the capital Novorossiysk (previously and subsequently Ekaterinoslav, the present-day Ukrainian city of Dnipropetrovsk, not to be confused with present-day Novorossiysk, Russian Federation). In 1802 it was divided into three governorates, the Yekaterinoslav, Kherson, and the Taurida.

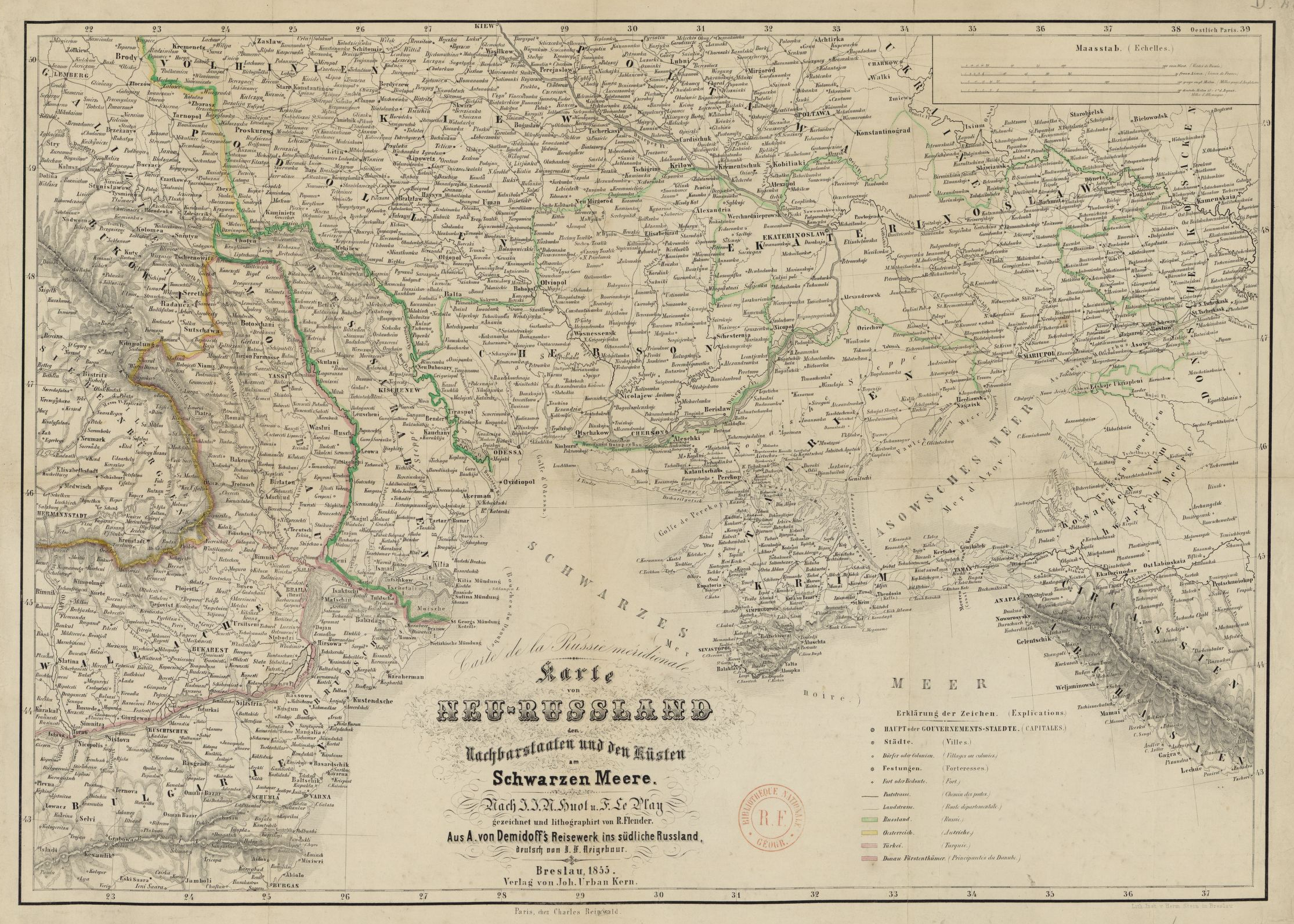
A historical German map of Novorossiya 1855

From 1822 to 1873 the Novorossiysk-Bessarabia General Government was centred in Odesa. The region remained part of the Russian Empire until its collapse following the Russian February Revolution in early March 1917.

=== Soviet era (1918–1990) ===
The territory became part of the short-lived Russian Republic for one year, then in 1918 it was largely included in the Ukrainian State and in the Ukrainian Soviet Republic at the same time. In 1918–1920 it was, to varying extents, under the control of the anti-Bolshevik White movement governments of South Russia, whose defeat signified the Soviet control over the territory, which became part of the Ukrainian Soviet Socialist Republic within the Soviet Union in 1922.

=== Legacy ===
Following the Soviet Union's collapse on 26 December 1991 and concurrent with the lead-up to Ukrainian independence on 24 August 1991, a nascent movement began in Odesa for the restoration of Novorossiya region; it however failed within days and never defined its borders. The initial conception had not developed exact borders, but focus centred on the Odesa, Mykolaiv, Kherson, and Crimean oblasts, with eventually other oblasts joining as well.

The name received renewed emphasis when Russian President Vladimir Putin stated in an interview on 17 April 2014 that the territories of Kharkiv, Luhansk, Donetsk, Kherson, Mykolaiv and Odesa were part of what was called Novorossiya. (Note: Kharkiv was the centre of the historical region of Sloboda Ukraine. A portion of modern Kharkiv Oblast includes territory of the late-eighteenth century Novorossiya Governorate.) In May 2014, the self-proclaimed Donetsk People's Republic and Luhansk People's Republic proclaimed the confederation of Novorossiya and its desire to extend its control towards all of southeastern Ukraine. The confederation had little practical unity and within a year the project was abandoned: on 1 January 2015 the founding leadership announced the project had been put on hold, and on 20 May the constituent members announced the freezing of the political project.

Anna Nemtsova forecast this disintegration in August 2014, and she predicted the 2022 Russian invasion of Ukraine then too. Oksana Yanyshevskaya, a Ukrainian government official, in a July 2014 interview with her said that Novorossiya "is some sort of artificial idea that lives only in the minds of people in the Kremlin."

In 2016 Marlène Laruelle wrote that Alexander Prokhanov formed the Izborsky Club around the Novorossiya meme.

Gerard Toal opines that "In breaking apart a sovereign territorial state, it is helpful, if not always necessary, to have an alternative geopolitical imaginary at the ready and for this ersatz replacement to have some degree of local credibility and support." The Novorossiya idea is just this portmanteau.

The idea of Novorossiya goes hand-in-hand with the erasure of Ukrainian statehood, or as Vladislav Surkov said in his defenestration interview in February 2020, "There is Ukrainian-ness. That is, a specific disorder of the mind. An astonishing enthusiasm for ethnography, driven to the extreme." Surkov claims that Ukraine is "a muddle instead of a state. […] But there is no nation. There is only a brochure, 'The Self-Styled Ukraine', but there is no Ukraine."

During the Wagner Group mutiny in June 2023, President Putin used the phrase in a speech responding to the mutiny, praising those "who fought and gave their lives to Novorossiya and for the unity of the Russky Mir".

In an interview in August 2025, Russian foreign minister Sergey Lavrov used the term to refer to an area separate from the Donbas and Crimea, alleging that, despite Russia's invasion, "Neither Crimea, nor Donbas, nor Novorossiya as territories have ever been our goal."

== Demographics ==
=== Ethnicity ===
The ethnic composition of Novorossiya changed during the beginning of the 19th century due to the intensive movement of colonists who rapidly created towns, villages, and agricultural colonies. During the Russo-Turkish Wars, the major Turkish fortresses of Ozu-Cale, Akkerman, Khadzhibey, Kinburn and many others were conquered and destroyed. New cities and settlements were established in their places. Over time the ethnic composition varied.

Multiple ethnicities participated in the founding of the cities of Novorossiya (most of these cities were expansions of older settlements). For example:

- Zaporizhzhia as formerly the site of a Cossack fort
- Odesa, founded in 1794 on the site of a Tatar village (the first recorded mention of a settlement located in current Odesa was in 1415) by a Spanish general in Russian service, José de Ribas, had a French mayor, Richelieu (in office 1803–1814)
- Donetsk, founded in 1869, was originally named Yuzovka (Yuzivka) in honor of John Hughes, the Welsh industrialist who developed the coal region of the Donbas

According to the report of governor Aleksandr Shmidt (ru), the ethnic composition of Kherson Governorate (which included the city of Odesa) in 1851 was as follows:

Nationality	Number	%
Ukrainians (Malorussians)	703,699	69.14
Moldovans and Vlachs (Romanians)	75,000	7.37
Jews	55,000	5.40
Russian-Germans	40,000	3.93
Great Russians	30,000	2.95
Bulgarians	18,435	1.81
Belarusians	9,000	0.88
Greeks	3,500	0.34
Romani people	2,516	0.25
Poles	2,000	0.20
Armenians	1,990	0.20
Karaites	446	0.04
Serbs	436	0.04
Swedes	318	0.03
Tatars	76	0.01
Former Officials	48,378	4.75
Nobles	16,603	1.63
Foreigners	10,392	1.02
Total Population	1,017,789	100

=== Language ===
With regard to language usage, Russian was commonly spoken in the cities and some outside areas, while Ukrainian generally predominated in rural areas, smaller towns, and villages.

The 1897 All-Russian Empire Census statistics show that Ukrainian was the native language spoken by most of the population of Novorossiya, but with Russian and Yiddish languages dominating in most city areas.

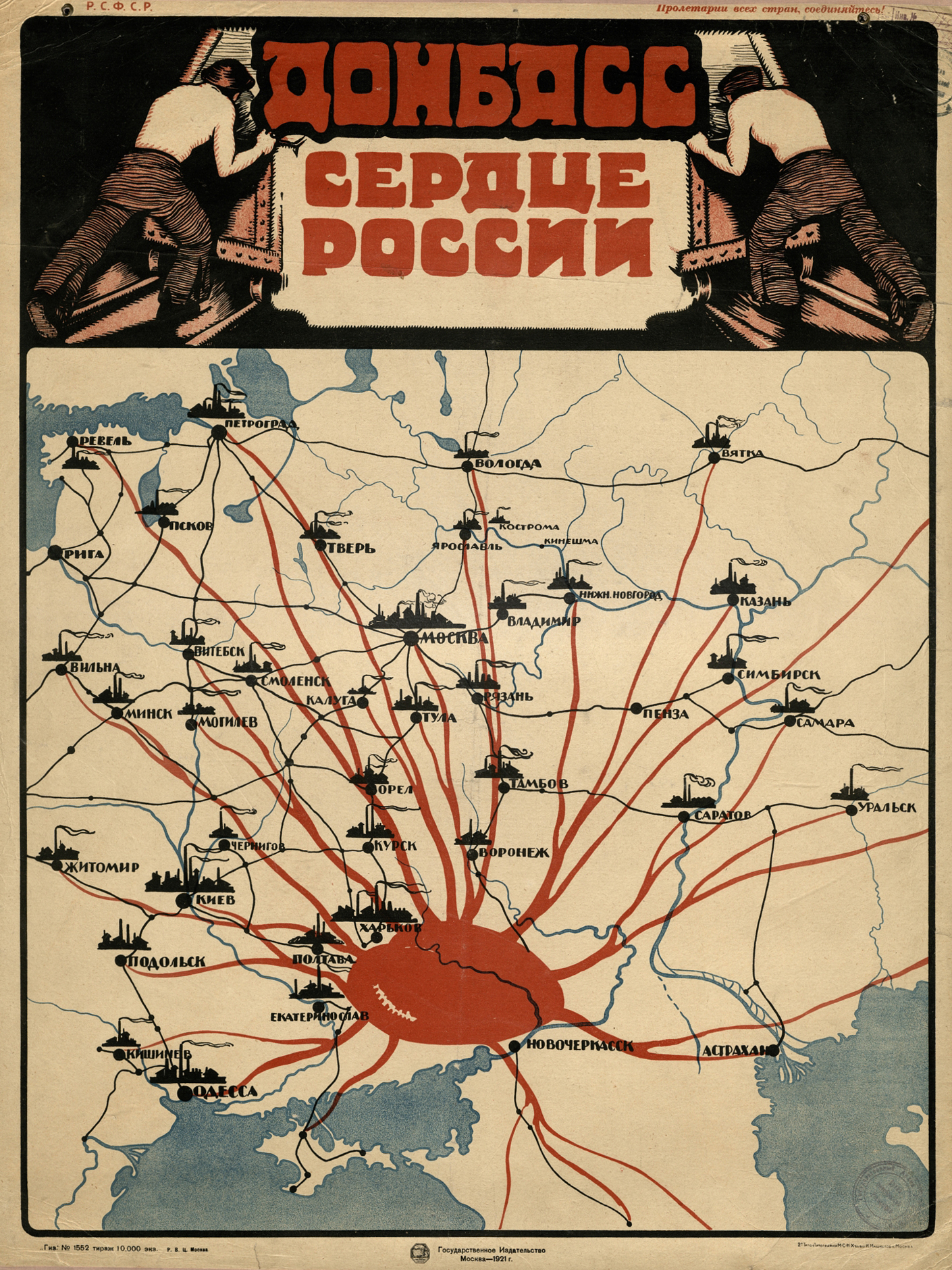
Soviet Russian poster from 1921 — "Donbas is the heart of Russia".

Language	Kherson Guberniya	Yekaterinoslav Guberniya	Tavrida Guberniya
Ukrainian	53.4%	68.9%	42.2%
Russian	21.0%	17.3%	27.9%
Belarusian	0.8%	0.6%	6.7%
Polish	2.1%	0.6%	0.6%
Bulgarian	0.9%	–	2.8%
Romanian	5.3%	0.4%	0.2%
German	4.5%	3.8%	5.4%
Jewish (sic)	11.8%	4.6%	3.8%
Greek	2.3%	2.3%	1.2%
Tatar	8.2%	8.2%	13.5%
Turkish	2.6%	2.6%	1.5%
Total Population	2,733,612	2,311,674	1,447,790

The 1897 All-Russian Empire Census statistics:

Language	Odesa	Yekaterinoslav	Mykolaiv	Kherson	Sevastopol	Mariupol	Donetsk district
Russian	198,233	47,140	61,023	27,902	34,014	19,670	273,302
Jewish (sic)	124,511	39,979	17,949	17,162	3,679	4,710	7
Ukrainian	37,925	17,787	7,780	11,591	7,322	3,125	177,376
Polish	17,395	3,418	2,612	1,021	2,753	218	82
German	10,248	1,438	813	426	907	248	2,336
Greek	5,086	161	214	51	1,553	1,590	88
Total Population	403,815	112,839	92,012	59,076	53,595	31,116	455,819

== List of founded cities ==
Many of the cities that were founded (most of these cities were expansions of older settlements) during the imperial period are major cities today.

Imperial Russian regiments were used to build these cities, at the expense of hundreds of soldiers' lives.

=== First wave ===
- Yelisavetgrad (Kropyvnytskyi) (1754)
- Aleksandrovsk (Zaporizhzhia) (1770)
- Yekaterinoslav (Dnipro) (1776)
- Kherson (1778)
- Mariupol (1778)
- Olviopol (Pervomaisk) (1781)
- Sevastopol (1783)
- Simferopol (1784)
- Melitopol (1784)
- Pavlohrad (1784)

=== Second wave ===
- Mykolaiv (1789)
- Tiraspol (1792)
- Odesa (1794)
- Yekaterinodar (Krasnodar) (1794)

=== Third wave ===
- Berdiansk (1827)
- Novorossiysk (1838)
- Melitopol (1842)

== See also ==
- Donetsk–Krivoy Rog Soviet Republic
- New Serbia
- Novorossiya (confederation)
- Old Great Bulgaria
- Railways of Novorossiya (company created in 2023)
- Russian irredentism
- Slavo-Serbia
- Southern Ukraine
- Territorial evolution of Russia
- Other Russian imperial terms
  - White Russia
  - Great Russia
  - Little Russia
