= West Serbia =

West Serbia or Western Serbia may refer to:

- in geography, western regions of modern Serbia
- in administration, statistical region of Šumadija and Western Serbia

== See also ==
- Serbia (disambiguation)
- North Serbia (disambiguation)
- East Serbia (disambiguation)
- South Serbia (disambiguation)
