= Old Croatian =

Old Croatian or Old Croatian language may refer to:

- Proto-Slavic language (Common Slavic), the form of speech before all Slavic languages diverged from a hypothetical common ancestor
- Croatian recension of Old Church Slavonic, the first literary Slavic language
- Chakavian, a South Slavic supradialect that formed the basis of early literary standards in medieval Croatia

== See also ==
- Old Serbian (disambiguation)
