= North Serbia =

North Serbia or Northern Serbia may refer to:

- in geography, northern regions of the modern Republic of Serbia, Vojvodina
- in medieval history, the Realm of Stefan Dragutin, northern of two Serbian kingdoms at the end of 13th and the beginning of 14th century
- in modern history, the Voivodship of Serbia (1849–1860), northern of two Serbian entities, the other being the Principality of Serbia
- North Serbia (1919–1922)

== See also ==
- Serbia (disambiguation)
- West Serbia (disambiguation)
- South Serbia (disambiguation)
- East Serbia (disambiguation)
