= Rajko Depreradović =

Serbian colonist of Donbas, present-day Ukraine

Rajko Depreradović (c. 1710 – after 1764; also spelled Rajko Preradović) was a leader of colonists who settled free lands in what is now known as Donbas that were offered for settlement in 1752 to Serbs, Vlachs and other Balkan people of the Christian Orthodox faith to ensure frontier protection and development of the steppes. The settlement was then called Slavo-Serbia and it was directly governed by Russia's Governing Senate and College of War. The settlers eventually formed the Bakhmut hussar regiment in 1764. Also in 1764, Slavo-Serbia was transformed into the Donets uyezd of Yekaterinoslav Governorate (now in Dnipropetrovsk Oblast, Ukraine). The Slavo-Serbia commanders were colonels Rajko Preradović and Jovan Šević, who led their soldiers in various Russian military campaigns; in peacetime, they kept the borderlands, along with the Cossacks, free from incursions by other states.

== Biography ==
Rajko Preradović's ancestors first settled in an area around Grubišno Polje, some 30 kilometers south-east of Bjelovar in Habsburg Military Frontier. Son of Grenz infantry officer Stepan Depreradović, Rajko followed his family's military tradition and joined the Military Frontier as a young man. His family was given Habsburg nobility in the seventeenth century for their military service to the crown and began using the Nobiliary particle. He became a Pomorišje border, lieutenant colonel, before heading one of two convoys of colonists in Imperial Russia in 1752. The other convoy was headed by Jovan Šević.

Rajko (Rodion) Stepanovich Depreradović arrived with his family and began to build and develop the homesteads in their new homeland. Three of his sons and their children and relatives, all achieved prominence in the Russian military.

== Family history ==
The Preradovići hail from Old Serbia, from where they settled the Kingdom of Hungary. Jovan Preradović from Bačka received Hungarian noble status in 1626. The nobility status was confirmed in 1667 for Jovan's son, Ivan. A Preradović family moved from Počitelj, Čapljina in Bosnia and Herzegovina to Donja Krajina (modern Bjelovar-Križevci County) in 1750. Lieutenant Colonel Rajko Preradović from Bačka brought the first group of Serbs from Potisje to Russia in 1751. The Preradović family was one of several families that had settled Slavo-Serbia. The Preradović family in Hungary were kin to the Preradović family in the Military Frontier. The Preradović family in the Tisa Military Frontier received nobility status in 1704. General and poet Petar Preradović belonged to this family.

== See also ==
- New Serbia
- Jovan Šević
- Jovan Horvat
