= Principality of Serbia (disambiguation) =

Principality of Serbia was the official name of Serbia from 1815 to 1882.

Principality of Serbia may also refer to:

- Principality of Serbia (early medieval), early medieval Serbian principality, during the 8th to 10th centuries
- Grand Principality of Serbia, medieval Serbian principality, from the 11th to the beginning of the 13th century
- Principality of Serbia (late medieval), late medieval Serbian principality, also known as Moravian Serbia (1371–1402)

== See also ==
- Serbia (disambiguation)
- Kingdom of Serbia (disambiguation)
- Serbian Kingdom (disambiguation)
- Republic of Serbia (disambiguation)
