= East Serbia =

East Serbia of Eastern Serbia may refer to:

- For the eastern regions of modern Serbia; see List of regions of Serbia
- Moravian Banovina, former province (1929–1941), encompassing eastern regions of modern Serbia and colloquially known as Eastern Serbia
- Southern and Eastern Serbia, statistical region of modern Serbia

== See also ==
- Serbia (disambiguation)
- South Serbia (disambiguation)
- West Serbia (disambiguation)
- North Serbia (disambiguation)
