= South Serbia =

South Serbia of Southern Serbia may refer to:

- Southern Serbia (region), Nišava, Toplica, Jablanica, Pčinja and Pirot districts
- South Serbia (1919–1922), former province, encompassing regions of Raška, Kosovo, Metohija and Vardar Macedonia
- Vardar Banovina, former province (1929–1941), encompassing Vardar Macedonia and southeastern modern Serbia
- Southern and Eastern Serbia, statistical region of Serbia

== See also ==
- Serbia (disambiguation)
- East Serbia (disambiguation)
- North Serbia (disambiguation)
- West Serbia (disambiguation)
