= Sorbia (disambiguation) =

Sorbia may refer to:

- Lusatia, a region split between Germany and Poland
- Sorbia (beetle), a genus of beetles

== See also ==
- Sorbian (disambiguation)
- Serbia (disambiguation)
