= Yekaterinoslav Viceroyalty =

1783–1796 unit of Russia

Yekaterinoslav Viceroyalty Екатеринославское наместничество
- Viceroyalty of Russian Empire
- 1783–1796
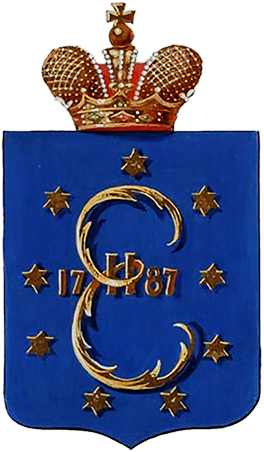
- Coat of arms

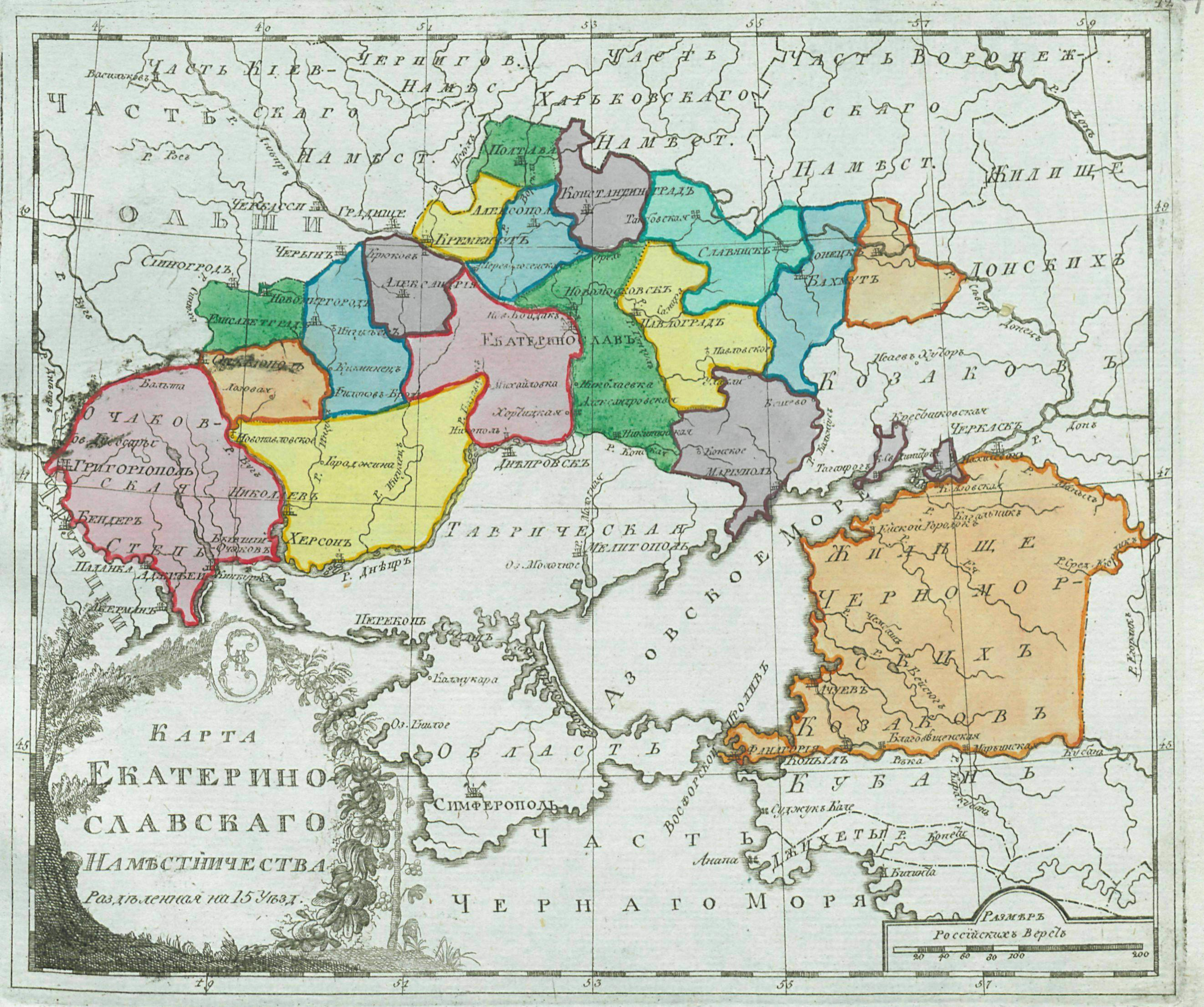
- Map of 1792
- Capital: Kremenchug (1783), Yekaterinoslav (1789-1796)
- History
  - Established: 26 March 1783
  - Disestablished: 31 December 1796
Preceded by
Novorossiya Governorate
Azov Governorate
Succeeded by
Don Host Oblast
Novorossiya Governorate
Yekaterinoslav Governorate
- Today part of: Ukraine; Russia

The Yekaterinoslav Viceroyalty (Note: Russian: Екатеринославское наместничество, romanized: Yekaterinoslavskoye namestnichestvo; Ukrainian: Катеринославське намісництво, romanized: Katerynoslavske namisnytsvo) was an administrative-territorial unit (namestnichestvo) of the Russian Empire, which was created on 26 March 1783 by merging Novorossiya Governorate and Azov Governorate. On 31 December 1796, it was incorporated into re-established Novorossiya Governorate.

== Composition ==
The Viceroyalty was divided into counties known as uyezds. There were around 15 counties.

=== Former Novorossiysk Governorate ===
- Poltava Province
  - Kremenchuk county (capital)
  - Kobelyaki county (previously Novye Sanzhary county)
  - Poltava county
- Yelizavetgrad Province
  - Yelizavetgrad county
  - Olviopol county (previously Yekaterinine county)
  - Petrikovka county (previously Kryukov county)
- Nikopol Province (previously Slaviansk Province)
  - Krivoy Rog county (previously Ingul county)
  - Nikopol county (previously Slaviansk county)
  - Novye Kodaki county (previously Saksangan county)
- Kherson Province
  - Kazykermen county
  - Novopavlovka county
  - Kherson county

=== Former Azov Governorate (II) ===
- Bakhmut county
- Aleksandrovsk county (New Dnieper fortification line and portion of Kalmius Palatinate)
- Yekaterinine county (Samar Palatinate)
- Marienpol county
- Natalkov county
- Pavlov county (main part of Kalmius Palatinate)
- Taganrog county
- Tor county
- Tsarychan county (Orel and Protovcha palatinates and Donets pikers regiment)

== Viceroyalty governors ==
=== Governor-General (Viceroy) ===
- 1783 — 05.10.1791 — Grigoriy Potemkin
- 1793—1796 — Platon Zubov

=== Viceroyalty governors ===
- 1783—1784 — Timofei Tutomlin
- 1784—1788 — Ivan Sinelnikov
- 1789—1794 — Vasiliy Kakhovskiy
- 1794—15.12.1796 — Joseph Horvat

== See also ==
- Yekaterinoslav Governorate
