= Srpska, Montenegro =

Srpska Српска Srska
- Village
- Location within Montenegro
- Country: Montenegro
- Municipality: Podgorica

Population (2011)
  - Total: 880
- Time zone: UTC+1 (CET)
  - Summer (DST): UTC+2 (CEST)

Srpska (Montenegrin: Српска) is a village in the new Zeta Municipality of Montenegro. Until 2022, it was part of Podgorica Municipality.

== History ==
Before Kingdom of Montenegro united with the Kingdom of Serbia and State of Slovenes, Croats and Serbs to form the Kingdom of Serbs, Croats and Slovenes in November 1918, village had been called Srska. The name was afterwards changed to Srpska, affiliating the toponym to the Serbs due to the long history of Montenegro as a Serbian country, though the name still sparks controversy among locals and a lot still perfer to call it Srska.

== Demographics ==
According to the 2011 census, its population was 880.

Ethnicity in 2011
Ethnicity	Number	Percentage
Montenegrins	567	64.4%
Serbs	237	26.9%
other/undeclared	76	8.6%
Total	880	100%
