= Serbian =

Serbian may refer to:

- Pertaining to Serbia in Southeast Europe; in particular
  - Serbs, a South Slavic ethnic group native to the Balkans
  - Serbian language
  - Serbian culture
  - Demographics of Serbia, includes other ethnic groups within the country
- Pertaining to other places
  - Serbia (disambiguation)
  - Sorbia (disambiguation)
- Gabe Serbian (1977–2022), American musician

== See also ==
- Sorbs
- Old Serbian (disambiguation)
