= Novorossiya Governorate =

1764–1802 unit of Russia

Coordinates: 48.4°N 35.0°E

Novorossiya Governorate Новороссийская губерния
- Governorate of the Russian Empire
- 1764–1783; 1796–1802
- Coat of arms

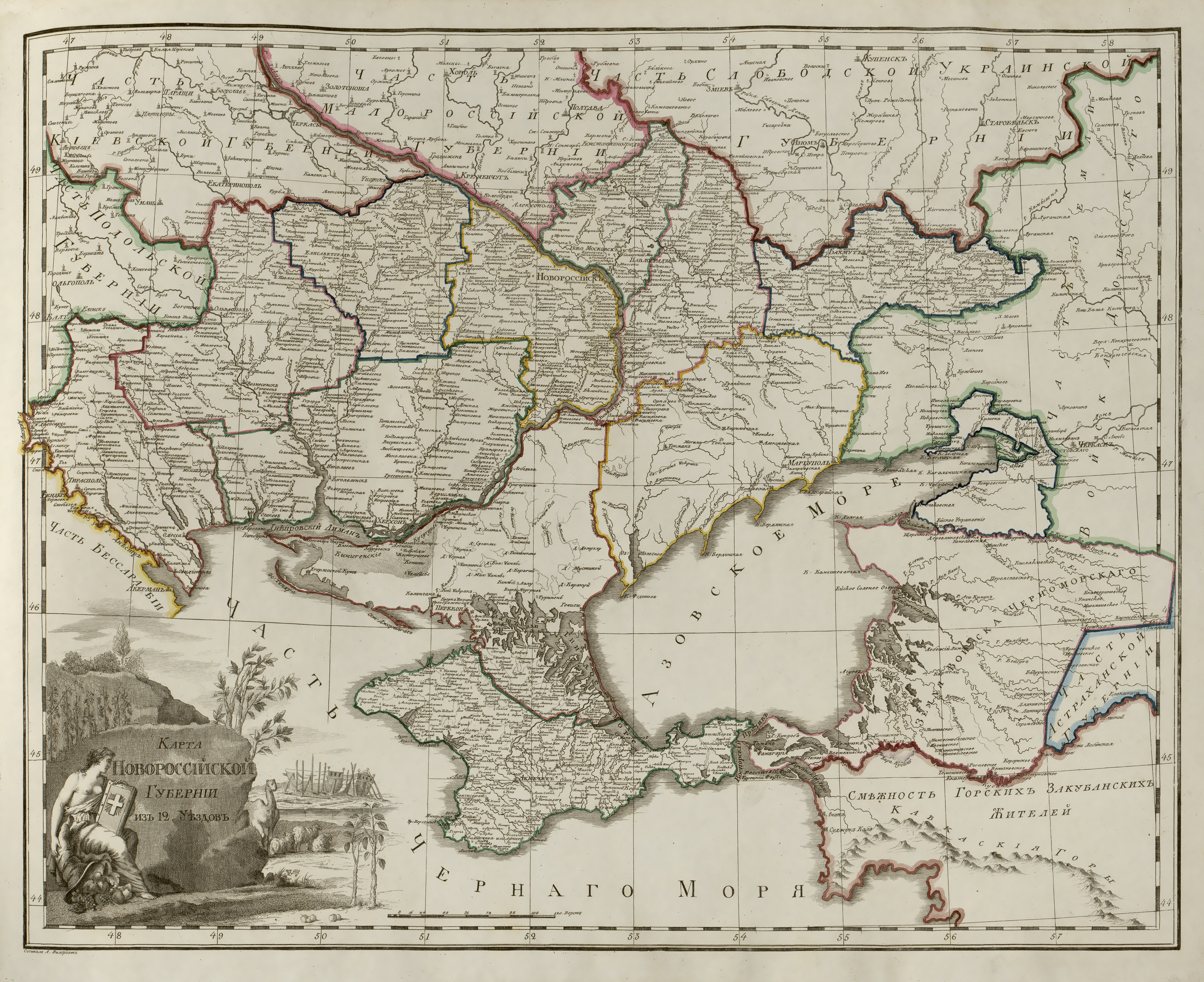
- General-Governorate of New Russia in 1800
- Capital: St Elizabeth Fort (1764–1765); Kremenchug (1765–1776); Yekaterinoslav (Novorossiysk) (1776–1783)
- Demonym: New Russian
- History
  - Established: 22 March 1764
  - First disestablishment: 26 March 1783
  - Reestablished: 31 December 1796
  - Disestablished: 1802
- Political subdivisions: provinces, uyezds
Preceded by
New Serbia
part of teretory from 1775: Zaporozhian Sich
Slavo-Serbia
Cossack Hetmanate
Cossack Defensive Line
part of teretory from 1796: Taurida Oblast
Yekaterinoslav Viceroyalty
Voznesensk Viceroyalty
Succeeded by
1775: Azov Governorate
Nikolayev Governorate
Taurida Governorate
Yekaterinoslav Governorate
- Today part of: Ukraine

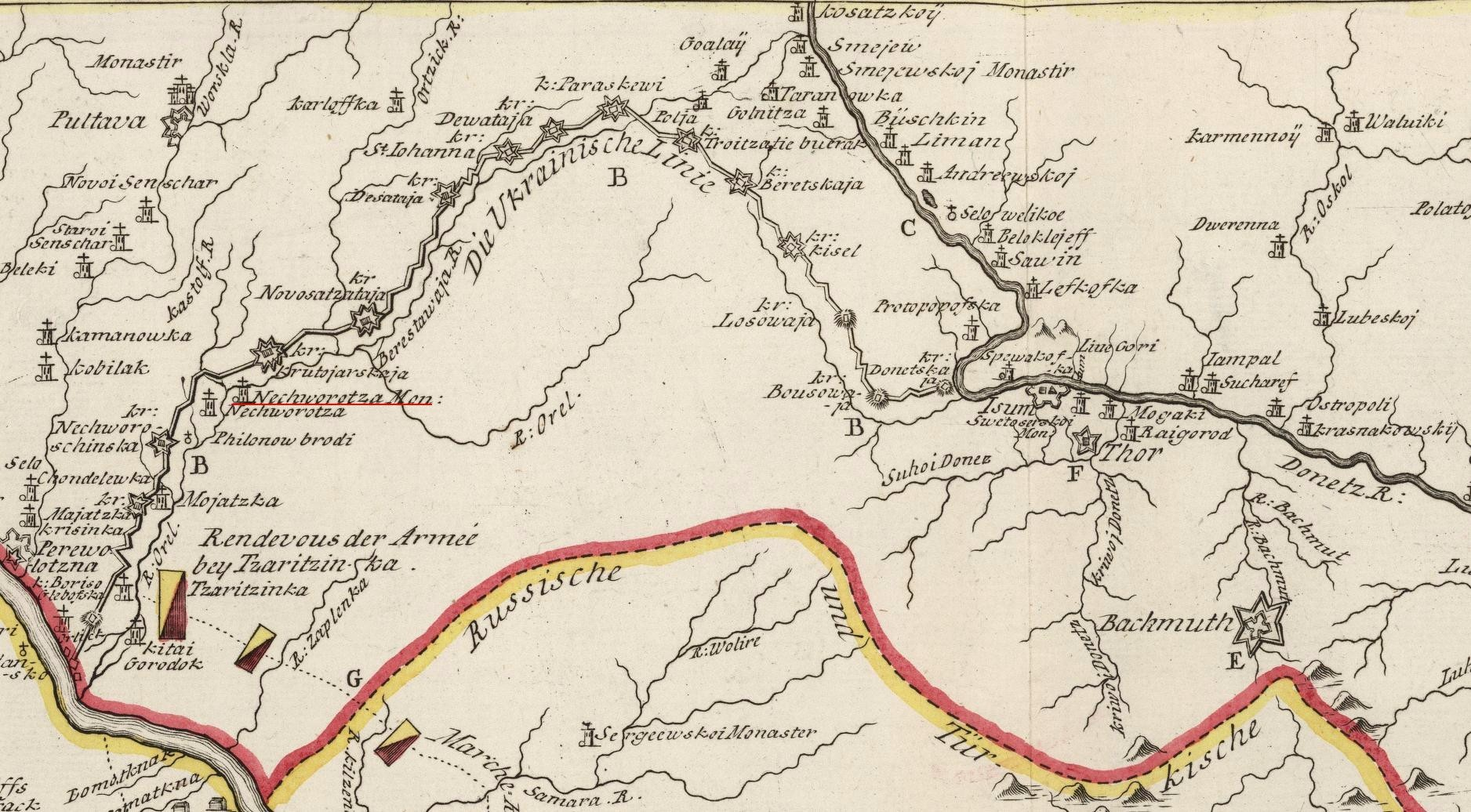
Map of the Ukrainian Line

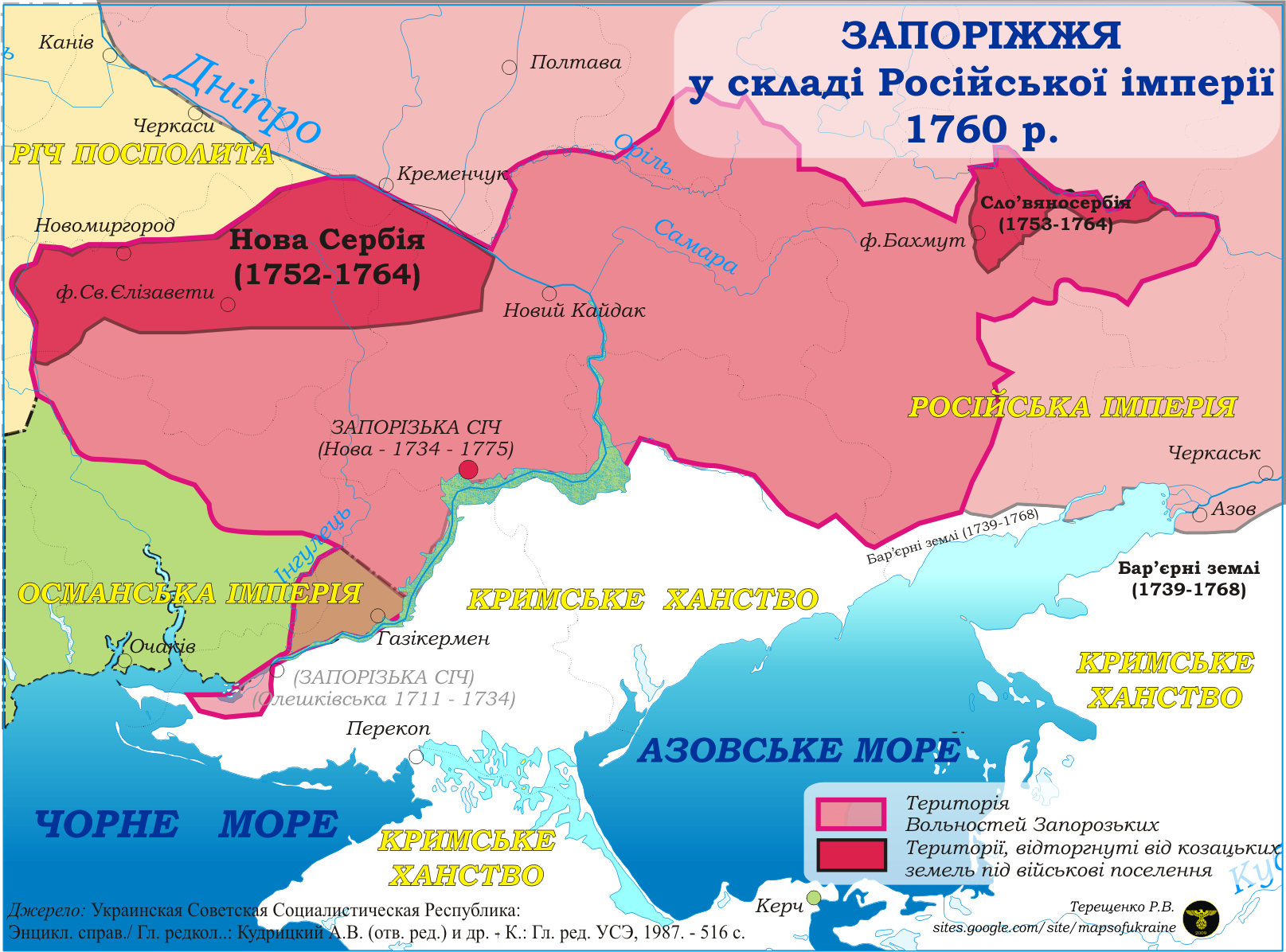
Zaporizhian Sich in 1760 with territories colonized by foreigners

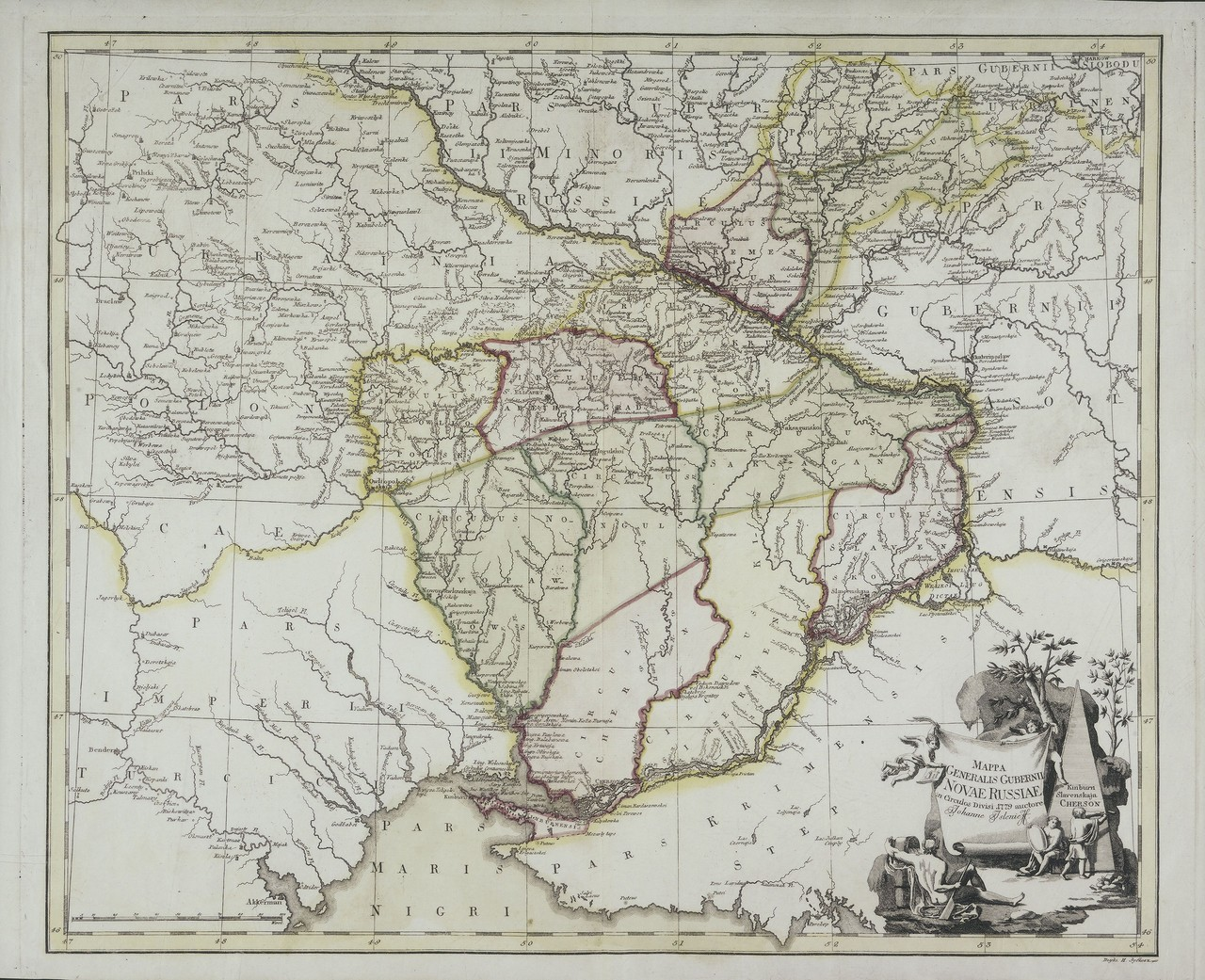
Map of the General-Governorate of New Russia in 1779 which shows partitioning of lands of the Zaporizhian Host between Novorossiya and Azoff governorates

Novorossiya Governorate (Note: Russian: Новороссийская губерния, romanized: Novorossiyskaya guberniya, lit. 'New Russia Governorate'; Ukrainian: Новоросійська губернія, romanized: Novorosiiska huberniia) was an administrative-territorial unit (guberniya) of the Russian Empire, which existed in 1764–1783 and again in 1796–1802. It was created soon after the establishment of the Ukrainian fortification line. The governorate was governed according to the "Plan for the Colonization of New Russia Governorate" issued by the Russian Senate. It became the first region in Russia where Catherine the Great allowed foreign Jews to settle.

Most of its territories belonged to the Zaporozhian Sich as well as the Poltava Regiment and Myrhorod Regiment of the Cossack Hetmanate. Its establishment was strategically successful and advantageous for Russia, and after the conclusion of the Russian war against Turkey in 1774 it gave a way for Russia to access the Black Sea and establish an area that became known as Novorossiya ("New Russia"). It was created based on the Military Frontier of the Austrian Empire against the Ottoman Empire and involved many military units from the region that were resettled in Ukraine. The military units included mounted cossacks (or hussars) and mounted pikers (or lancers).

In 1796, the governorate was reestablished, but with the centre not in Kremenchug but in Yekaterinoslav, and in 1802 was split into three governorates: the Yekaterinoslav Governorate, the Taurida Governorate, the Nikolayev Governorate (known as the Kherson Governorate from 1803).

== History ==
It was created on 2 April [O.S. 22 March] 1764 as a military district for the protection of the southern border of the empire and in preparation for the major military campaign of the Russo-Turkish War. The governorate united the territories of New Serbia, Slavo-Serbia, and the Slobidskyi regiment (today in Kirovohrad Oblast) which were the northern regions of Buhohard Palatinate (Zaporizhian Sich). The governorate, centered in the fortress of Saint Elizabeth, initially was divided into three territories (polki) assigned to each regiment in the area: Elizabeth City Pikers Regiment, Black Hussars Regiment, and Yellow Hussars Regiment.

As of 22 June [O.S. 11 June] 1764 the governorate also included the so-called Ukrainian Line, a line of Russian built fortresses between Dnieper and Donets) that was administrated by the Dnieper and Donets Pikers regiments (based on the Habsburg's Pandurs, the cossacks of Poltava, the Myrhorod regiments), the Slavo-Serbia with Luhansk Pikers Regiment, and the Raiko Preradovic and Ivan Sevic Hussars regiments (soon the later two were united into the Bakhmut Hussars Regiment) as well as the Samara Hussar Regiment (originally the Moldavian Hussars Regiment based in Kiev).

The first capital of the governorate was the city of Kremenchug (1765) with the fortress of Saint Elizabeth (today Kropyvnytskyi) serving that administrative function previously (1764).

=== Pikers unrest ===
In 1769–70 during the 1768–74 Russian-Ottoman War there was an uprising among the Dnieper and Donets Pikers regiments. The unrest started on territory of today's Poltava Oblast and eventually spread across the lands of the Zaporizhian Host. It was mercilessly put down by Russian Imperial forces and its instigators were punished by knout or sent to katorga. The Donets Pikers Regiment eventually was forcefully sent to the war where it played a key role in forcing Syvash, taken of Perekop, Caffa (Feodosiya).

=== Destruction of Zaporizhian Sich ===
In June 1775 the Russian Imperial Army razed the capital of the Zaporizhian Sich, after which all its lands were annexed to the Novorossiysk Governorate. The following year, Bakhmut Province and Yekaterinoslav Province were transferred to the newly established Azov Governorate.

== Subdivisions ==
The governorate was subdivided into 12 provinces (circuluses) and further into uyezdes (counties). The city of Yekaterinoslav (today – Novomoskovsk) was located in Azov Governorate. The city of Yekaterinoslav (today – Dnipro) was located in Novorossiya Governorate.

Following the liquidation of the Zaporozhian Sich, the territory of the Novorossiya Governorate expanded trifold, spanning from the rivers Bug (today Southern Bug) to Dnieper all the way to the Dnieper-Bug Estuary, including the Kinburn peninsula.

List of provinces (circuluses):

Territories before partitioning of the Sich

- Olviopolsk – Olviopol (today Pervomaisk)
- Elizabethgrad – Elizabethgrad (today Kropyvnytskyi)
- Krukov – Krukov (today the city district of Kremenchuk)
- Kremenchuk – Kremenchuk (the administrative center of the governorate)
- Poltava – Poltava
- Novo-Senzhar – Novo-Senzhar (today Novi Sanzhary)

Added territories after partitioning

- Kherson – Kherson (newly built settlement with fortress and the main Black Sea Admiralty)
- Novopavlovsk – Novopavlovsk (today Voznesensk)
- Ingulsk – Ingulsk (today village of Inhulo-Kamianka in Kropyvnytskyi Raion)
- Slavensk – Slavensk (today Nikopol)
- Kisikermen – Kisikermen (today Beryslav)
- Saksagan – Saksagan (today village of Saksahan in Kamianske Raion, Dnipropetrovsk Oblast)

== Second establishment ==
On 31 December 1796, Paul I reestablished the Novorossiya Governorate, mostly with land from the former Yekaterinoslav Viceroyalty. In 1802, this province was divided into the Nikolayev Governorate (known as the Kherson Governorate from 1803), the Yekaterinoslav Governorate, and the Taurida Oblast.

A Decree of 12 December 1796 set up a serf system on the territory of South Ukraine and Caucasus by attaching peasants to the land.

== Novorossiysk-Bessarabia General Governorate ==
The Novorossiysk and Bessarabian General Governorate was formed on May 23, 1822, with the center in Odessa. It consisted of the Kherson, Yekaterinoslav and Tauride provinces, as well as the Odessa, Taganrog, Feodosiya and Kerch-Yenikalsky city administrations. Nevertheless, Duke Richelieu, who was appointed to this position in 1805, was still considered the governor of the Novorossiysk Territory.

The Governate was abolished in 1873.

== Subdivisions ==
- Bakhmut Province (1764–1775) transferred to the Azov Governorate
- The city of provincial significance Kremenchuk
- Yekaterinoslav Province
- Elizabethgrad Province

== Governors ==
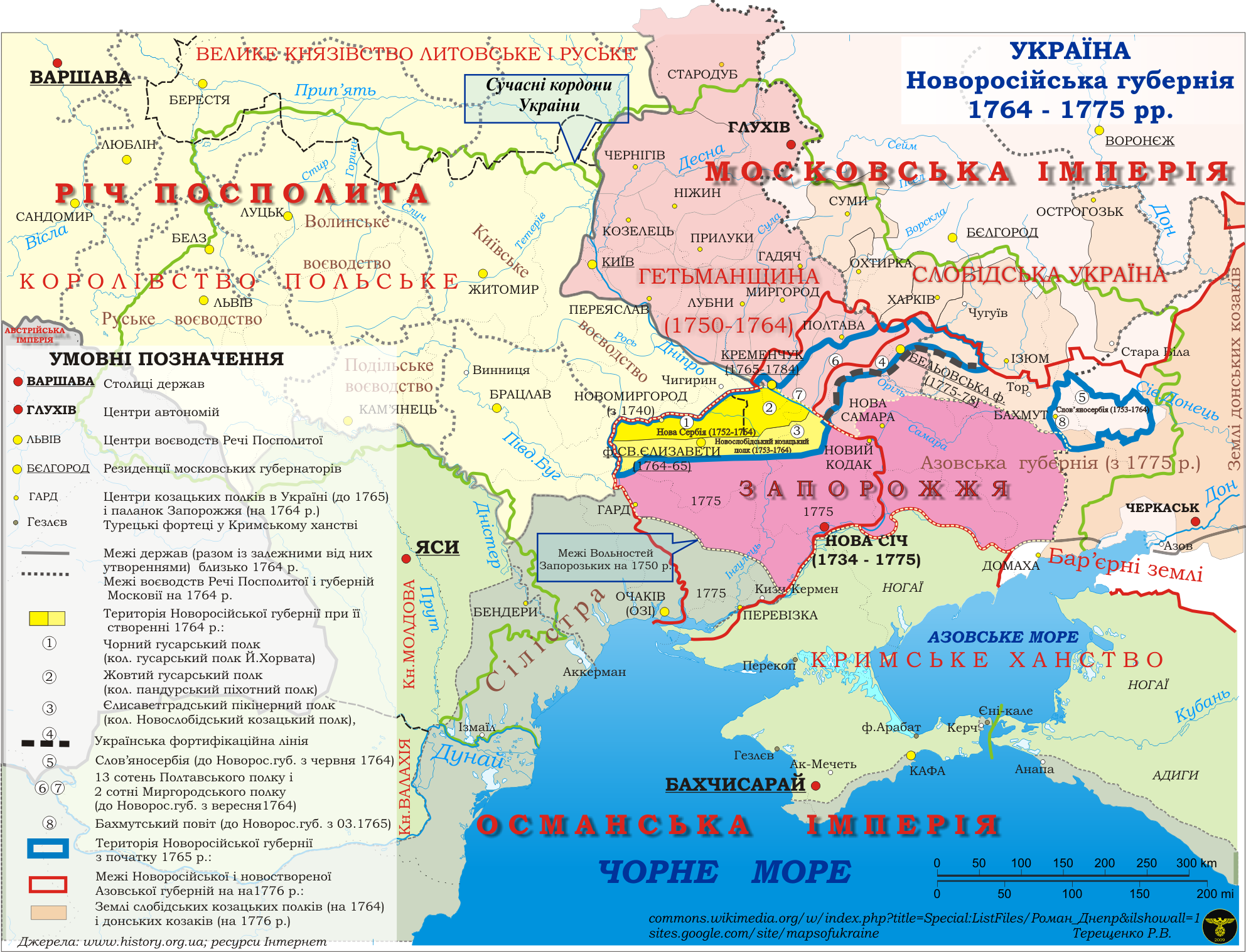
Lands of Ukraine in 1764–1776. Creation of a first Novorossiysk governorate (yellow color)

=== General Governors ===
- 1764–65 Aleksei Melgunov
- 1765–66 Yakov Brandt
- 1766–74 Fyodor Voeikov
- 1774–91 Grigory Potemkin
- 1791–96 Platon Zubov
- 1796–97 Nikolai Berdiayev
- 1805–14 Duc de Richelieu
- 1815–22 Alexandre de Langeron
- 1822–23 Ivan Inzov
- 1822–54 Mikhail Vorontsov
- 1830–32 Friedrich von der Pahlen
- 1854–55 Nicholas Annenkov
- 1855–64 Alexander Stroganov
- 1864–73 Paul Demetrius von Kotzebue

=== Viceroys (namestnik) ===
- 1779–83 Timofei Tutolmin
- 1783–88 Ivan Sinelnikov
- 1788–94 Vasiliy Kakhovsky
- 1794–96 Iosif Khorvat
- 1797–1800 Ivan Seletsky
- 1800–01 Ivan Nikolayev
- 1801–02 Mikhail Miklashevsky

== See also ==
- Yekaterinoslav Viceroyalty
- New Russia
