= Taurida Oblast =

1784–1796 unit of Russia

Coordinates: 45°02′N 38°58′E

Taurida Oblast Таврическая область
- Oblast of the Russian Empire
- 1784–1796
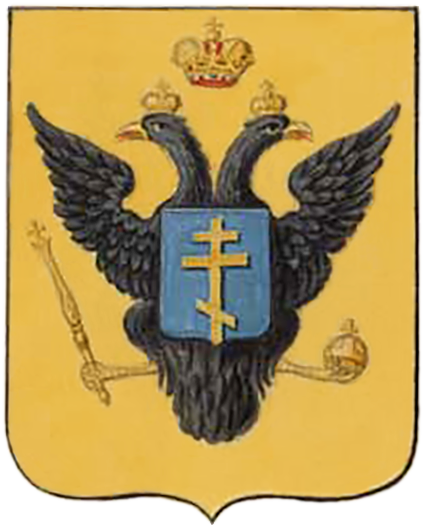
- Coat of arms

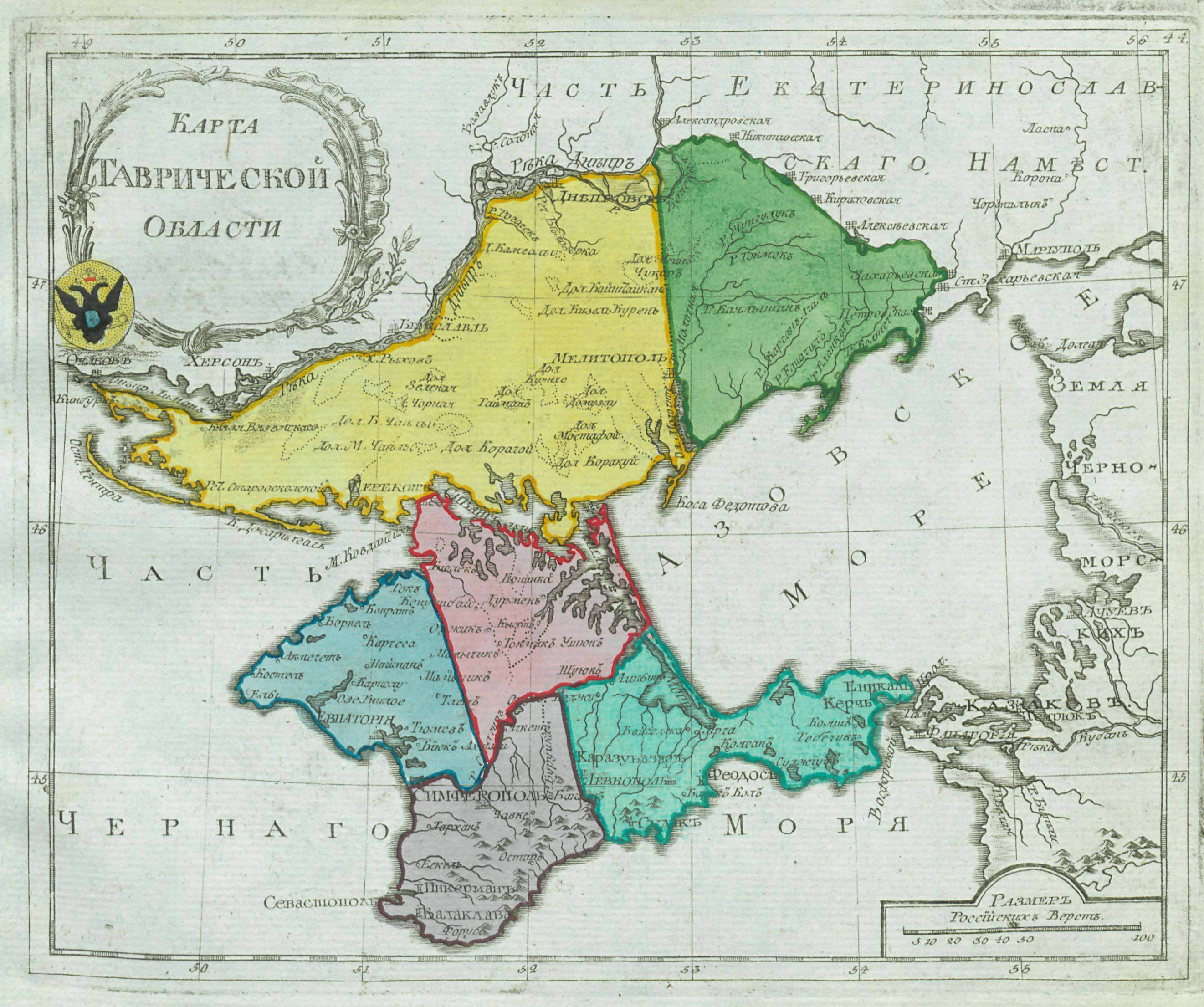
- Map of Taurida Oblast in 1792
- History
  - Established: 13 February 1784
  - Disestablished: 12 December 1796
- Political subdivisions: Uyezds
Preceded by	Succeeded by
Crimean Khanate	Novorossiya Governorate

Taurida Oblast (Russian: Таврическая область, romanized: Tavricheskaya oblast) was an administrative-territorial unit (oblast) of the Russian Empire. It roughly corresponded to most of the Crimean Peninsula and parts of the Southern Ukraine regions. It was created out of territories of the Crimean Khanate, which Russia annexed from the Ottoman Empire in 1783. In 1796 it was merged into the Novorossiya Governorate. The name Taurida comes from the old Greek name for the area, Tauris, as in ancient times several Greek city-states had developed colonial outposts in the area.

The oblast was created under the Imperial ukase of February 1784 signed by Catherine the Great. The administrative seat of the region was declared the city of Simferopol. Before 1784, Qarasuvbazar served as a temporary administrative center.

== Administrative structure ==
The oblast was divided into seven counties (uyezd).

- Dnieper county – centered in Aleshki (Oleshky)
- Levkopol county – centered in Levkopol (Staryi Krym)
- Melitopol county – centered in Melitopol (since 1791 in Great Tokmak)
- Perekop county – centered in Perekop
- Phanagoria (Tmutarakan) county – centered in Phanagoria
- Simferopol county – centered in Simferopol
- Yevpatoria county – centered in Yevpatoriya.

In 1787 Levkopol county were renamed into Feodosiya county and its center was moved to Feodosiya. In 1791 an administrative seat of Melitopol county was moved to Great Tokmak.

On 12 December 1796 the oblast was abolished, its territory was redivided into two counties (Aqmescit (former Simferopol) and Perekop) and passed to the Novorossiya Governorate. The city of Simferopol name was changed to Aqmescit.
