= Sorbian =

Sorbian may refer to:

- Sorbs, a Slavic people in modern-day Germany
- Sorbian languages, a group of closely related West Slavic languages
  - Upper Sorbian language
  - Lower Sorbian language
- Sorbian settlement area
- Sorbian March

== See also ==
- Serbin, Texas, founded by 19th Century Wendish immigrants, name is derived from the same root
