= New Serbia (historical province) =

Historical region in center of Ukraine

New Serbia Нова Сербія (Slavonic-Serbian) Нова Србија / Nova Srbija (Serbian) Новая Сербия (Russian) Нова Сербія (Ukrainian) Noua Serbie (Romanian)
- Territory of the Russian Empire
- 1752–1764
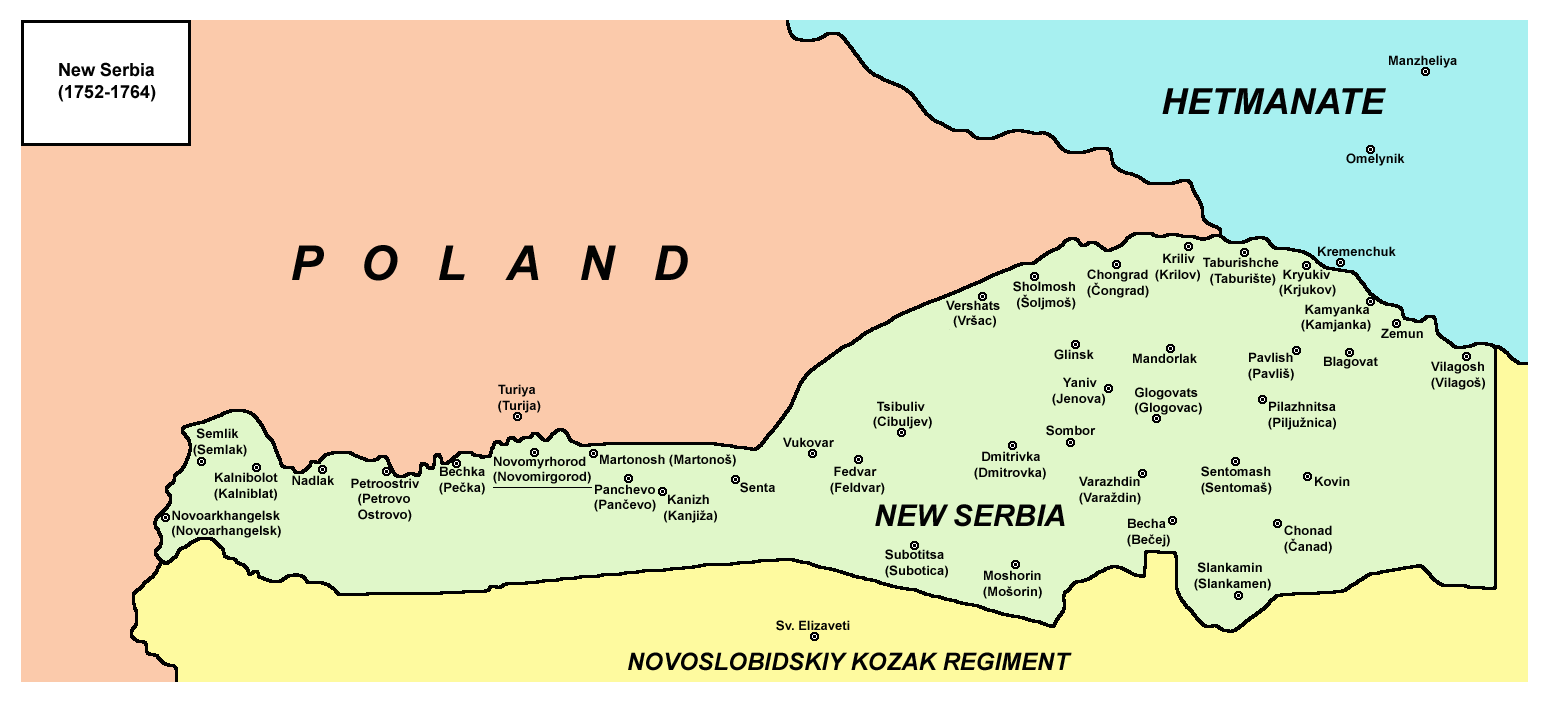
- Capital: Novomirgorod
- History
  - Established: 1752
  - Abolished: 1764
Preceded by	Succeeded by
Zaporizhian Sich	Novorossiya Governorate
- Today part of: Ukraine: Kirovohrad Oblast

New Serbia or Novoserbia (Note: Slavonic-Serbian: Нова Сербія or Ново-Сербія, romanized: Nova Serbiya or Novo-Serbiya; Serbian: Нова Србија or Новосрбија / Nova Srbija or Novosrbija; Russian: Новая Сербия or Новосербия, romanized: Novaya Serbiya or Novoserbiya; Ukrainian: Нова Сербія or Новосербія, romanized: Nova Serbiya or Novoserbiya; Romanian: Noua Serbie.) was a frontier region of Imperial Russia settled in 1752 by Serbian immigrants from the Military Frontier in the south of the Habsburg monarchy. It was situated in New Russia. From 1752 to 1764, it was subordinated directly to the Governing Senate and Military Collegium. In 1764, the territory became part of the New Russia Governorate.

Unlike serfs, Eastern Orthodox Serbs in the Frontier enjoyed substantial autonomy in exchange for providing soldiers to fight the Ottoman Empire. This was granted in multiple documents, starting with Statuta Valachorum, but was gradually eliminated with the creation of the centralised modern state.

In 1751, part of the Military Frontier was demilitarised, and many Serbs in that region objected to the resulting loss of privileges. Under a compromise reached after riots, some were transferred to the Banat Military Frontier, while those who remained in the region received provincial status with preserved religious autonomy.

Jovan Horvat led a group that rejected this compromise. Horvat instead proposed that they emigrate to Russia, where they would become military colonists on land recently captured from Ottoman Turkey. Tsarina Elizabeth of Russia enthusiastically supported this idea. It was the first centrally planned settlement of the southern steppe, which led to the deterioration of Russian relations with the Habsburg monarchy and the Ottoman Empire and the crystallisation of the key features of the future Eastern Question.

The region lay mostly in present-day Kirovohrad Oblast of Ukraine, although some parts were in present-day Cherkasy Oblast, Poltava Oblast, and Dnipropetrovsk Oblast. The administrative centre of New Serbia was Novomirgorod (literally "New Mirgorod"), which is now Novomyrhorod, Ukraine.

== History ==
The Russian state secured a large part of modern Ukraine through the 1667 Truce of Andrusovo and the 1686 Treaty of Perpetual Peace with the Polish–Lithuanian Commonwealth. Until 1764–1775, the territory had an autonomous local government with limited sovereignty, the Cossack Hetmanate.

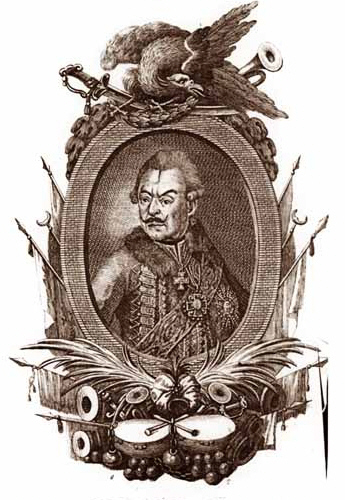
Peter Tekeli, a soldier on the journey from Berlin to the Caucasus. He was buried in "New Serbia."

In 1751 (or 1750 according to some sources) the Russian envoy in Vienna Count Mikhail Petrovich Bestuzhev-Ryumin was contacted by Jovan Horvat, a colonel of the Austrian military, with a request to allow him and other Serbs to resettle in the Russian Empire. They were Granichary (Grenz infantry) who protected the Austrian Military Frontier from the Ottoman Turks.

Russian authorities gave these Serbian settlers land, and they soon acquired the name New Serbia after the War of the Austrian Succession. Like the Austrian Military Frontier, New Serbia was organised into a military province located on the Russian-Polish border and on the land of the Zaporizhzhian Sich. The polity's purpose was to protect the southern borders of the Russian Empire and participate in Russian military operations in the region. The commandant of New Serbia was Jovan Horvat, who vouched for his subordinates, the Austrian Grenz infantry. Most settlers came from the Serbian Hussar Regiment because of its military merits. This unit had the same task as the Cossacks from Zaporizhzhia – the protection of the border area.

== Demographics ==
Before the formation of New Serbia, its territory included 3,710 houses of settlers from the Hetmanate, Slobozhanshchyna and Zaporizhia, 643 houses of native inhabitants and 195 houses of Ukrainian settlers from Poland–Lithuania and Moldavia. According to the memoirs of Serbian soldier and settler Aleksandar Piščević (Simeon Piščević's relative), their neighbours were Russians. When New Serbia was formed, the Russian senate ordered that all these settlers, except native inhabitants, must return to the places where they had previously lived.

After New Serbia's formation, its initial settlers were Serbs. Still, also many Moldavians and other Romanians (Mocani from Transylvania), Ruthenians, Ukrainians, Bulgarians, and others settled in the area.

Some of the original Ukrainian settlers who left New Serbia settled in the southern regions of modern-day Ukraine. In 1745, before the formation of New Serbia, its territory had 9,660 inhabitants, while in 1754 the number was 3,989.

Because of the large number of Moldavian settlers, the largest ethnic group in the province in 1757 was not Serbs, but Moldavians. In 1757, the population of New Serbia numbered 5,482 inhabitants, including:

- 75.33% Moldavians
- 11.56% Serbs
- 13.11% others

== Settlements ==
=== Settlements of New Serbia ===
In their new home, Serbs established new settlements and named them after places in their old home in the Pannonian Plain (in modern-day Serbia, Croatia, Romania, and Hungary). Serbs also renamed some older settlements, giving them Serbian names. Of the 41 settlements that existed in New Serbia, 26 were founded before the arrival of the Serbs.

Older Ukrainian/Russian name (1.)	Serbian name from the middle of the 18th century	Ukrainian/Russian name from the middle of the 18th century (1.)	Newer or modern Ukrainian/Russian name (1.)
Skaleva	Semlac (2.)	Semlik	Skaleva
-	Novoarhangelsk / Arhangelsk	Novoarkhanhelsk / Novoarkhangelysk	Novoarkhanhelsk / Novoarkhangelsk
Hanivka	Kalniblat / Kalnibolot	Kalnybolot / Kalynibolot	Kalnybolota
-	Nadlac (2.)	Nadlak	Nadlak
Davydivka / Davidovka	Petrovo Ostrovo / Petro-Ostrov (2.)	Petroostriv	Petroostriv
Korobchyne / Korobchino	Pečka (2.)	Bechka	Korobchyne
Tresiahy / Trisyaga	Novomirgorod / Novi Mirgorod	Novomyrhorod / Novomirgorod	Novomyrhorod / Novomirgorod
Yaremyn Bairak / Yermina Balka	Martonoš (2.)	Martonosh	Martonosha
Vilkhuvatka / Olykhovatka	Pančevo (2.)	Pancheve / Panchevo	Pancheve
Try Bairaky / Tri Bayraki	Kanjiža (2.)	Kanizh	Kanizh
Mohyliv / Mogilovo	Senta (2.)	Senta	Mohyliv / Rodnykivka
-	Vukovar (2.)	Vukovar	Bukvarka
-	Feldvar / Fedvar (2.)	Fedvar	Pidlisne
Mala Adzhamka	Subotica (2.)	Subotets / Subotitsa	Subottsi
Nekrasivska	Mošorin (2.)	Moshoryn / Moshorin	Moshoryne
-	Cibuljev / Cibulev	Tsybuliv / Tsibuliv	Tsybuleve
-	Dmitrovka	Dmytrivka / Dmitrivka	Dmytrivka
Dykivka	Sombor (2.)	Sombor	Dykivka
Protopopivka	Varaždin (2.)	Vorozhdyn / Varazhdin	Protopopivka
Usivka	Bečej (2.)	Becha	Usivka (now Oleksandriia)
-	Glinsk	Hlynsk / Glinsk	Hlynsk / Glinsk
Pantaziivka	Jenova	Yaniv	Ivanivka
-	Mandorlak (2.)	Mandorlak	-
Kosivka	Glogovac (2.)	Hlohovats / Glogovats	Kosivka
Butivka	Pavliš (2.)	Plavysh / Pavlish	Pavlysh
-	Piljužnica	Pilazhnytsia / Pilazhnitsa	-
Onufriivka	Blagovat	Blahovat / Blagovat	Onufriivka
-	Sentomaš/Srbobran(2.)	Sentomash	-
-	Kovin (2.)	Kovin	-
-	Csanád (2.)	Chonad	-
-	Slankamen (2.)	Slankamin	-
Nesterivka	Vršac (2.)	Vershats	Vershatsi
Stetsivka	Šoljmoš / Šolmoš (2.)	Sholmosh	Stetsivka
Andrusivka	Čongrad (2.)	Chonhrad / Chongrad	Velyka Andrusivka
-	Krilov	Kryliv / Krilov	Kryliv
-	Taburište / Taburino	Taburyshche / Taburische	Svitlovodsk
-	Krjukov	Kryukiv	Kriukiv (now part of Kremenchuk)
-	Kamjanka / Kamenka	Kamianka	Kamiani Potoky
Plakhtiivka	Zemun (2.)	Zemun	Uspenka
Deriivka	Vilagoš (2.)	Vilahosh / Vilagosh	Deriivka
-	Turija (2.) (3.)	Turiia / Turiya	Turiia / Turiya

Notes:

- (1.) Ukrainian and Russian names are given in Latin script transliterations.
- (2.) Serbs brought these names from their old homeland in the southern Pannonian Plain. Places with the same names also exist (or existed) in modern-day Serbia (Vojvodina), Croatia, Romania and Hungary.
- (3.) The Serbian settlement of Turiya (Turija) was located in what sources describe as a nominal Polish–Lithuanian territory. The border between New Serbia and Poland was, however, often disputed and unstable.

=== Origin of settlement names ===
Places in New Serbia whose names can also be found in the territory of the Pannonian Plain (mostly in Vojvodina and Pomorišje) include:

- Sombor, named after Sombor in Vojvodina, Serbia
- Sentomash (Sentomaš), named after Sentomaš, modern Srbobran in Vojvodina, Serbia
- Slankamin (Slankamen), named after Slankamen in Vojvodina, Serbia
- Vershats (Vršac), named after Vršac in Vojvodina, Serbia
- Subotitsa (Subotica), named after Subotica in Vojvodina, Serbia
- Moshorin (Mošorin), named after Mošorin in Vojvodina, Serbia
- Senta, named after Senta in Vojvodina, Serbia
- Kanizh (Kanjiža), named after Kanjiža in Vojvodina, Serbia
- Martonosh (Martonoš), named after Martonoš in Vojvodina, Serbia
- Panchevo (Pančevo), named after Pančevo in Vojvodina, Serbia
- Nadlak, named after Nădlac in Romania
- Turiya (Turija), named after Turija in Vojvodina, Serbia
- Vukovar, named after Vukovar in Croatia
- Fedvar (Feldvar), named after Feldvar/Feldvarac, modern Bačko Gradište in Vojvodina, Serbia
- Chongrad (Čongrad), named after Csongrád in Hungary
- Zemun, named after Zemun, today part of Belgrade, in Serbia
- Varazhdin (Varaždin), named after Varaždin in Croatia
- Kovin, named after Kovin in Vojvodina, Serbia
- Vilagosh (Vilagoš), named after Vilagoš, former Serbian name of modern Șiria in Romania
- Becha (Bečej), named after Bečej in Vojvodina, Serbia
- Semlik (Semlak), named after Semlac in Romania
- Petroostriv (Petrovo Ostrovo), named after a place in Romania
- Bechka (Pečka), named after Pecica in Romania
- Mandorlak, named after a place in Romania
- Glogovats (Glogovac), named after Glogovac in Serbia
- Pavlish (Pavliš), named after Pavliš in Vojvodina, Serbia
- Chonad (Čanad), named after Cenad in Romania
- Sholmosh (Šoljmoš), named after Șoimoș in Romania

== Gallery ==
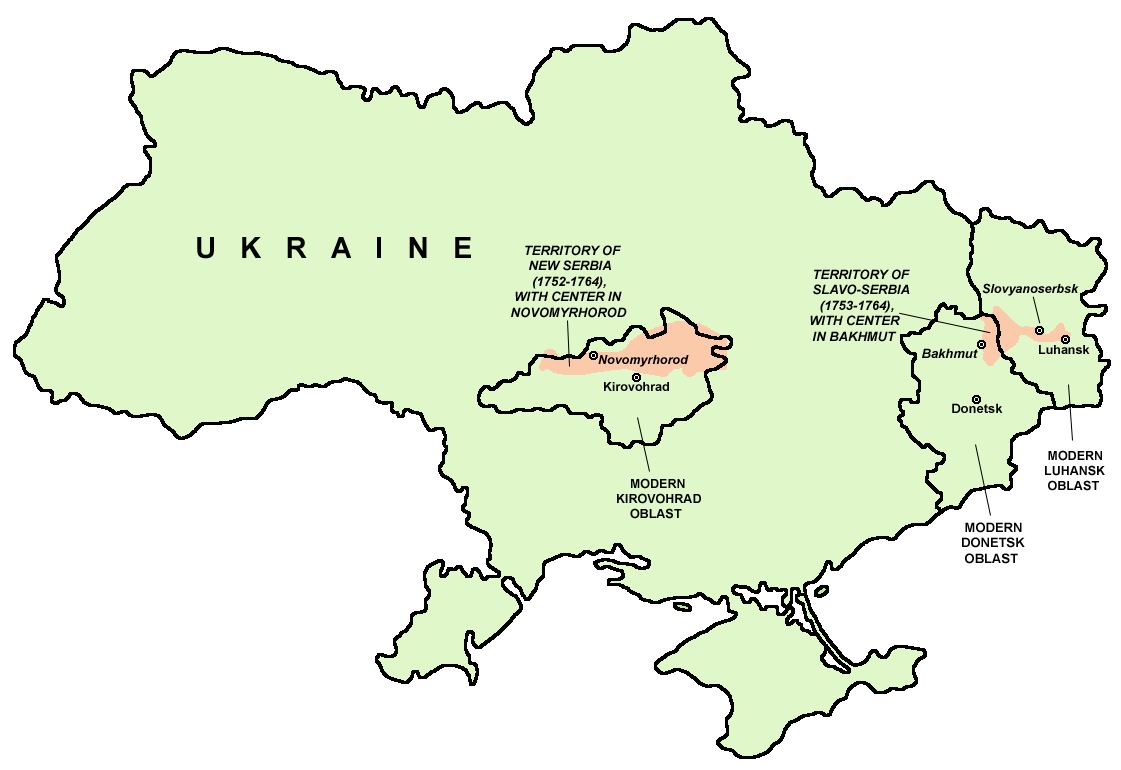
The location of New Serbia within the borders of modern-day Ukraine

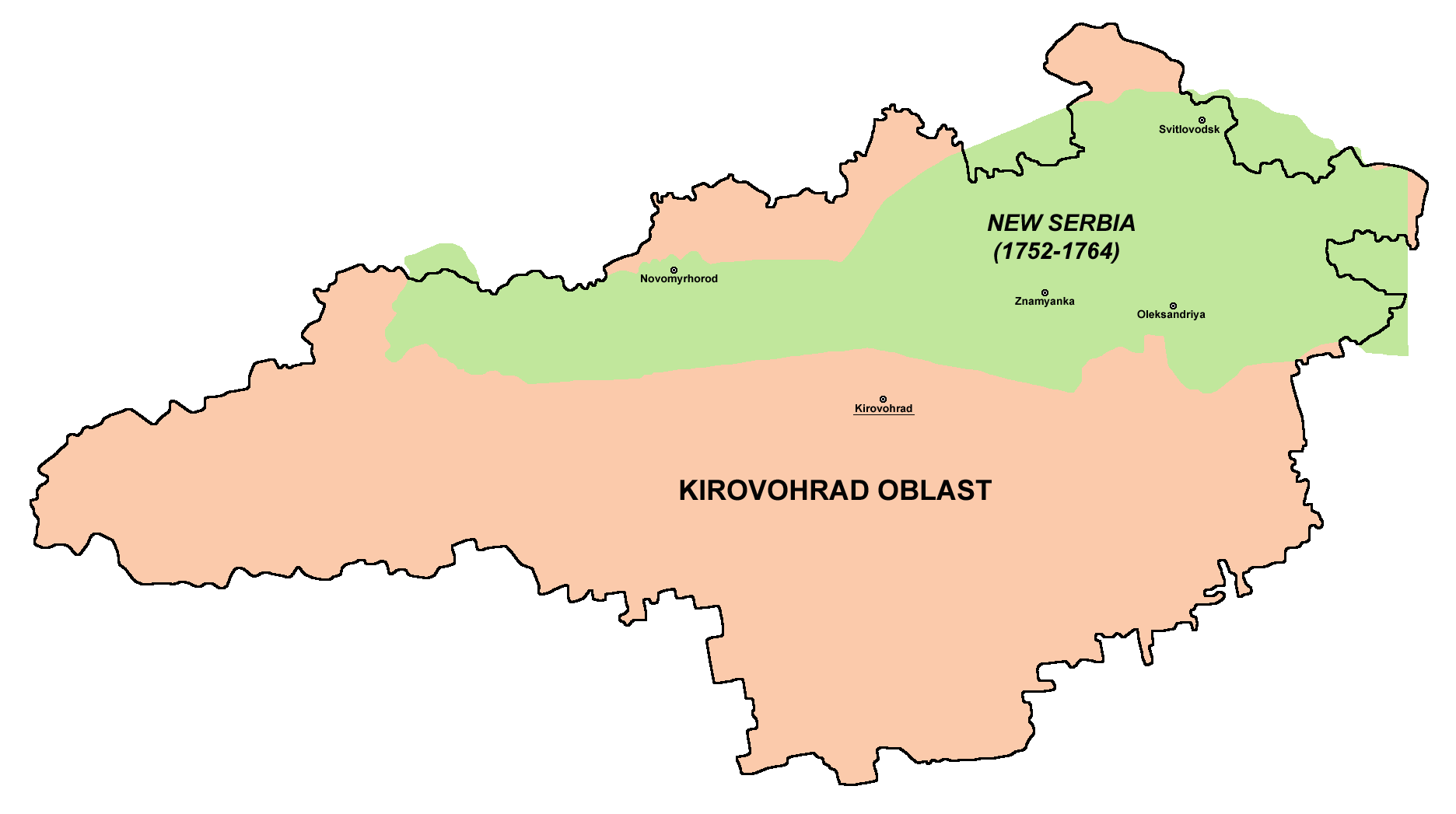
New Serbia within the borders of modern-day Kirovohrad Oblast

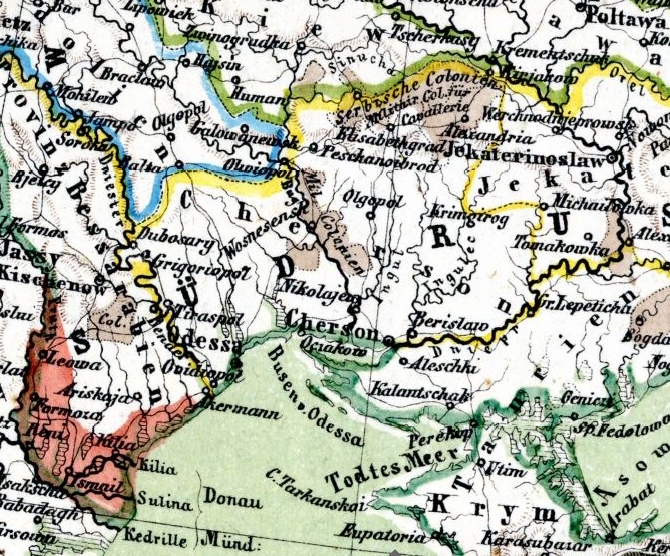
1862 map with New Serbia marked as "Serbische Colonien" 'Serbian colonies'

== See also ==
- Slavo-Serbia
- Jovan Šević
- Jovan Albanez
- Rajko Depreradović
