= Serbia (disambiguation) =

Serbia is a southeastern European country.

Serbia may also refer to:

== In the Balkans ==
- Central Serbia, or Serbia proper, the central heartland of the Republic
- Principality of Serbia (early medieval) (8th–10th century)
- Grand Principality of Serbia (1101–1217)
- Kingdom of Serbia (1217–1346)
- Serbian Empire (1346–1371)
- Moravian Serbia (1371–1402)
- Serbian Despotate (1402–1537)
- Kingdom of Serbia (1718–1739), crown land of the Habsburg Empire
- Revolutionary Serbia (1804–1815)
- Principality of Serbia (1815–1882)
- Voivodeship of Serbia and Banat of Temeschwar (1849–1860)
- Kingdom of Serbia (1882–1918)
- Old Serbia, a geographical and historical region
- Austro-Hungarian occupation of Serbia, Habsburg-occupied Serbia (1915–1918)
- Territory of the Military Commander in Serbia (1941–1944), German-occupied territory of Serbia
- Socialist Republic of Serbia (1944–1992), a part of the Socialist Federal Republic of Yugoslavia
- Serbia and Montenegro (2003–2006), Federation of Serbia and Montenegro
- Greater Serbia, ultra-nationalist expansionist concept
- Mother Serbia, national personification of Serbia

== Elsewhere ==
- New Serbia (historical province), a region in Russia (now part of Ukraine), created in 1752
- Slavo-Serbia, a territory of Russia (now part of Ukraine) between 1753–1764
- White Serbia, the proposed homeland of the Serbs, located in Sorbia, Germany

== See also ==
- East Serbia (disambiguation)
- South Serbia (disambiguation)
- West Serbia (disambiguation)
- North Serbia (disambiguation)
- Serbian republic (disambiguation)
- Serbian (disambiguation)
- Serbs, a South Slavic ethnic group and nation
- Sorbia (disambiguation)
- 1564 Srbija, an asteroid
- Heavenly Serbia
- Republika Srpska, one of the two political entities of Bosnia and Herzegovina
