= Slavo-Serbia =

Territory of Imperial Russia from 1753 to 1764

Slavo-Serbia Славеносрбија / Slavenosrbija Слов'яносербія Славяносербия
- territory of the Russian Empire
- May 29, 1753–1764
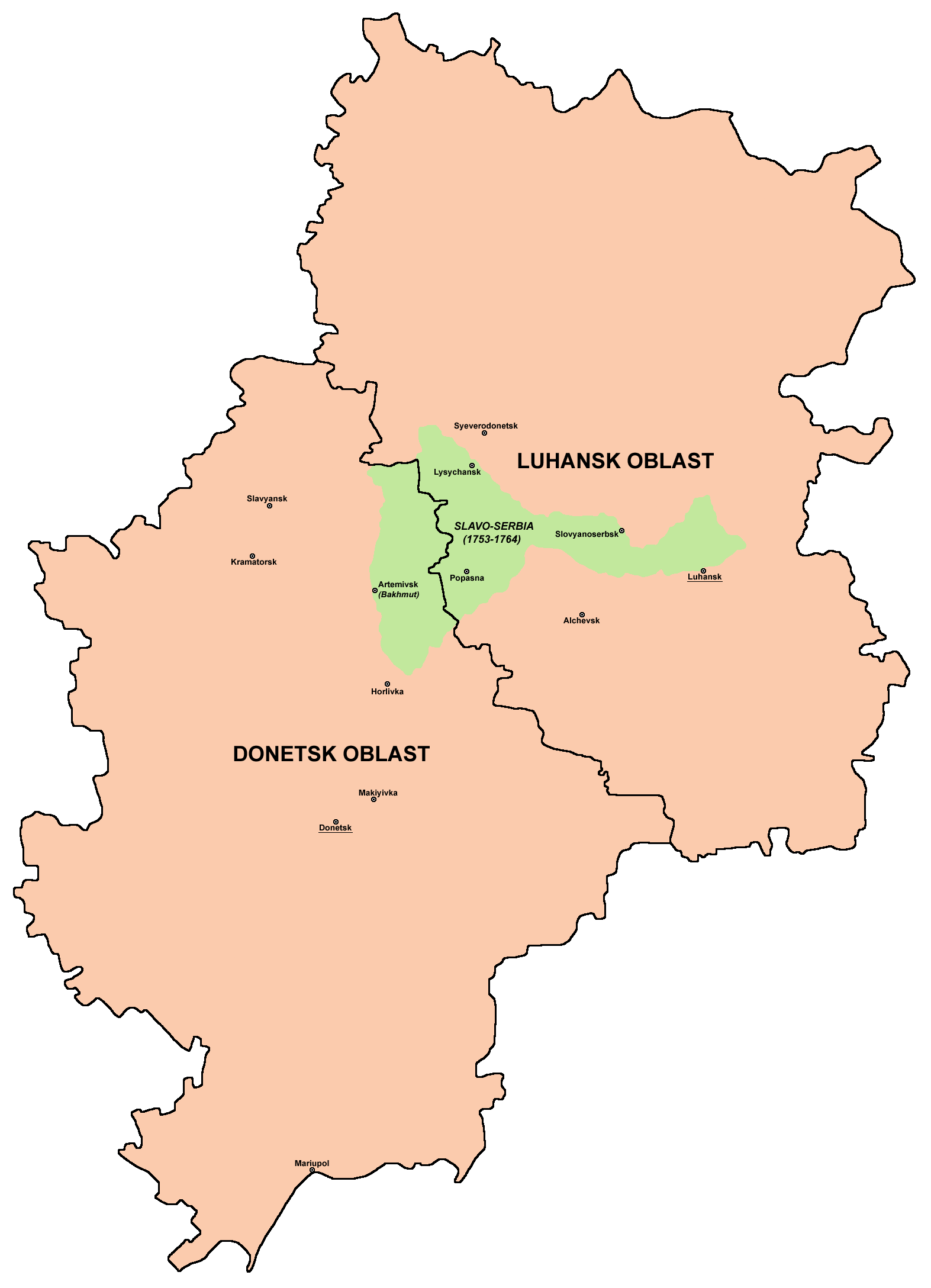
- A map of Slavo-Serbia (in green) superimposed onto the borders of modern-day Donetsk Oblast and Luhansk Oblast in Ukraine
- Capital: Bakhmut
- Population
  - 1760: 26,000
- History
  - Established: May 29, 1753
  - Abolished: 1764
Succeeded by
Novorossiya Governorate
- Today part of: Ukraine

Slavo-Serbia or Slaveno-Serbia (Note: Ukrainian: Слов'яносербія, romanized: Slovianoserbiia Russian: Славяносербия, romanized: Slavyanoserbiya Serbian: Славеносрбија, Slavenosrbija or Славосрбија, Slavosrbija Slavonic-Serbian: Славо-Сербія or Славено-Сербія) was a territory of Imperial Russia from 1753 to 1764. It was located to the south of the Donets River, between the Bakhmutka River and Luhan River. This area today is located within present-day Luhansk Oblast and Donetsk Oblast of Ukraine. The administrative centre of Slavo-Serbia was Bakhmut.

It was bounded on the north by Slobozhanshchyna, on the west by the Cossack Hetmanate (a.k.a. the Zaporizhian Host), the Crimean Khanate to the south, and the Don Cossack Host to the southeast.

== Background ==
As far back as 1723, Serb military colonists had been settling to a limited extent in the area that is now modern Ukraine. These Serbs came largely from the Military Frontier of the Habsburg Empire, where they enjoyed autonomy from the state. The abolishment of sectors of the frontier, and thus the loss of their autonomy, has been cited as a major reason for emigration to the Russian Empire.

The Serbian polymath and historian Zaharije Orfelin posited that the Orthodox peoples of the Balkans were chosen by Tsar Peter for settlement because, as speakers of a similar language and followers of the same religion, they would be "more reliable" than the Zaporozhian Cossacks, who were considered "insufficient". In October 1723, a group of predominantly Serb soldiers led by officer Jovan Albanez were officially formed into the Serbian Hussar Regiment.

A year before the founding of Slavo-Serbia, a similar but separate colony called New Serbia was created in 1752.

== History ==
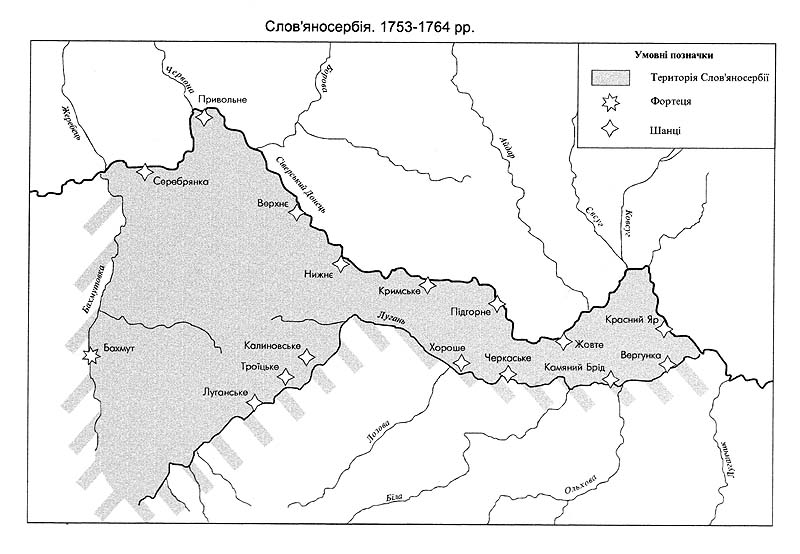
Map of Slavo-Serbia

By the decree of the Senate of May 29, 1753, the free lands of this area were offered for settlement to Serbs, Romanians, Bulgarians, Greeks and other Balkan peoples of Orthodox Christian denomination to ensure frontier protection and development of this sparsely inhabited part of the steppes. The administrative center of the colony was made Bakhmut. The Sloviano-Serbia Commission that administered the area was based in the town. Slavo-Serbia was directly governed by Russia's College of War.

As a prime goal of the colony was to protect the Russian Empire's southern borders, the Serb and other South Slavic settlers were predominantly of a military background, and the capital town of Bakhmut was fortified. The settlers were divided into two military regiments, led by major generals Rajko Preradović and Jovan Šević (also known as Ivan Šević). The Serb officers like Preradović and Šević and their families went on to become wealthy landowners.

The Serb settlers had hostile relations with the local Ukrainian population, who made up the majority of the population of the region.

The Russian government plans had anticipated that each regiment would contain 2,000 men, but by 1764, the total number of military men was at most 1,264. As a result, the two regiments were merged into the Bakhmut hussar regiment with its headquarters in Bakhmut, and that same year in 1764, Slavo-Serbia was abolished completely, and its territory transferred to the newly created Novorossiya Governorate.

== Legacy ==
Decades after the liquidation of the colony, the settlement of Pidhirne, (Note: Ukrainian: Підгірне Russian: Подгорное, romanized: Podgornoye Serbian: Podgorno) which had been set up in the colony in 1753 was renamed to Slovianoserbsk, a name which it still holds today as a modern town.

The Serbs who settled these areas have since largely assimilated with the local Ukrainians over the centuries, but in Ukraine's modern Luhansk, Donetsk, and Kirovohrad regions which cover the former land of Slavo-Serbia and the similar colony New Serbia, people with Serbian surnames can still be found.

The settlers named many settlements in the colony after places from their homes back in the Balkans. In June 2000, amid celebrations of the 250th anniversary of Serb migration to Russia, there were efforts to make establish relations between the Ukrainian settlements and the settlements they had been named for in the Bačka and Banat regions.

== Demographics ==
The province had an ethnically diverse population that included Serbs, Romanians, and others. In 1755, the population of Slavo-Serbia numbered 1,513 inhabitants (of both genders). In 1756, in the regiment of Jovan Šević, there were 38% Serbs, 23% Romanians, and 22% others.

== See also ==
- Jovan Horvat

== Bibliography ==
- Kostić, Mita [in Serbian] (2001). "Nova Srbija i Slavenosrbija" (PDF) (in Serbo-Croatian). Novi Sad. Archived from the original (PDF) on 2009-03-06.
- Posunjko, Olga M. (2002). Istorija Nove Srbije i Slavenosrbije [History of New Serbia and Slavo-Serbia]. Novi Sad: Srpsko-Ukrajinsko Društvo.
- Rudjakov, Pavel (1995). Seoba Srba u Rusiju u 18. veku. Belgrade.
- Katchanovski, Ivan; Kohut, Zenon E.; Nebesio, Bohdan Y.; Yurkevich, Myroslav (2013). Historical Dictionary of Ukraine. Vol. 2. Scarecrow Press. ISBN 978-0810878471.
