= Onufriivka Raion =

Former subdivision of Kirovohrad Oblast, Ukraine

Onufriivka Raion Онуфріївський район
- Raion
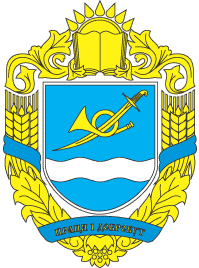
- Flag Coat of arms

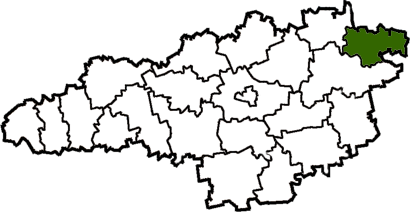
- Coordinates: 48°51′18″N 33°32′30″E
- Country: Ukraine
- Region: Kirovohrad Oblast
- Established: 1923
- Disestablished: 18 July 2020
- Admin. center: Onufriivka
- Subdivisions: List: 0 — city councils; 2 — settlement councils; 11 — rural councils; Number of localities: 0 — cities; 2 — urban-type settlements; 27 — villages; — rural settlements

Government
  - Governor: Valeriy Paliy

Area
  - Total: 889 km^{2} (343 sq mi)

Population (2020)
  - Total: 17,250 ▼
  - Density: 19.4/km^{2} (50.3/sq mi)
- Time zone: UTC+02:00 (EET)
  - Summer (DST): UTC+03:00 (EEST)
- Postal index: 28100—28132
- Area code: +380 5238
- Website: http://onufrievka.kr-admin.gov.ua

Onufriivka Raion was a raion of Kirovohrad Oblast in central Ukraine. Its administrative center was the urban-type settlement of Onufriivka. The raion was abolished on 18 July 2020 as part of the administrative reform of Ukraine, which reduced the number of raions of Kirovohrad Oblast to four. The area of Onufriivka Raion was merged into Oleksandriia Raion. The last estimated population (in 2020) was 17,250.

At the time of disestablishment, the raion consisted of one hromada, Onufriivka settlement hromada with the administration in Onufriivka.

== Geography ==
The raion was located in the northeastern part of Kirovohrad Oblast and was bordered to the north by Poltava Oblast, to the east by Dnipropetrovsk Oblast, to the southwest by Oleksandriia Raion and Dnipropetrovsk Oblast, and to the west by Svitlovodsk Raion. The area of the raion was 889 km^{2} (3.6% of area of the oblast).

== History ==
The oldest traces of human existence in the Onufriivka area date from the Neolithic era.

The district center, being the town of Onufriivka, was founded in the early 17th century. The settlement was named after Zaporizhzhia Cossack Onufriyenko.

At the time of the liberation war of the Ukrainian people in 1648–1654, there was already a considerable settlement, the inhabitants of which took part in the campaigns of Bohdan Khmelnytsky. The population of Onufriivka grew when farming refugees from Volhynia, Galicia, and Bessarabia arrived, who were drawn by the large amounts of virgin wilderness, forests, rivers and magnificent meadows. Local residents are mainly involved in less advanced livestock farming. Fairs were held every year in autumn, when merchants from Kremenchug and Kyiv visited the town. In 1752, military settlements were established and Onufriivka joined the New Serbia and became the property of Ivan Horvath-Otkurtycha, and in the 1770s, descendants of Horvath-Otkurtycha sold Onufriivka to Mikhail Ivanovich Kamburley who was a counselor, senator, civil governor of Volhynia.

In the winter of 1805, the landowner I. Kamburley removed serfs from their estates in Orel and Tambov provinces. Later, he won ten families in a game of cards with a castle-wall keeper, and other serfs traded in a Prince for a thoroughbred dog. He posted these settlers on his lands, establishing the village of Kamburliyivka (in honor of his name) and Zybkove. Today these villages where inhabitants are living descendants of immigrants from Russia are officially Russian territory.

The village of Vyshnivtsi (formerly Ivanivka) appeared in 1777. Landowner M. Kamburley explorers in Zaporizhzhia officers Holodiya, bought for 30 rubles. Silver captive Tatar Peter Sahaydysha, baptised him married to Ukrainian and settled on the farm. Next to the Farm in 1792, Kamburleya instructed the settlement of several immigrant families from Poland. Thus arose a village in honor of his father, a landlord called Ivanivna.

In 1821, after the death of M. Kamburley, his entire Kamburleya property passed into the possession of Count Michael D. Tolstoy, who was married to Kamburley's daughter Kamburleya Kateryna. Count Tolstoy inherited the villages of Onufriivka, Kamburliyivka, Lozuvatka, and Ivanivka, i.e. 13 thousand acres of land. The Tolstoy line was rich and ancient, as evidenced by family coat of arms with the motto: «Преданностью и усердием».(«Dedication and diligence»)

Mykhailo D. Tolstoy was a large landowner and implemented on their land advanced methods of management, the savings were used at that time purely on equipment, iron plows, threshing and winnow horse. There was even a tractor, "Fordzon." On the farm, award-winning horses were bred, which proved to be popular in Russia and abroad. They also reared breeds of sheep rambulye (8 thousand units) and gray Ukrainian cows (600 goals). The wool from the sheep was sent to Bialystok and Lodz wool factory. At the height of its power, the town had its own brick factory, and all buildings on the estate were built from their own brick, which became a mark of high quality, especially in 1911. Through donations from the Tolstoy family (MM Tolstoy and his mother OG Tolstoy), a school was built, in which children spent time studying and striving towards an attractive appearance as well as inner sense and beauty. Hospitals and schools were also built in the village of Pavlysh, and a Township Board, veterinaries, vicarage, Zemstvo in Onufriivka. The Tolstoy family also founded Onufriivka Park. One of the disciples of the Russian scientist Dokuchaev led the work. All work was carried out by the hands of the multitude of serfs of Count Tolstoy. Old Park counts its age from 20 years of the 19th century. And a half century later a new addition was made to the south of the river Omelnychok. The area of the park is 84 hectares, of which 22 hectares are water mirror ponds. On its territory there were more than 100 species of trees and shrubs, original pavilions, bridges, small architectural forms, and bulk island with gazebo and bathing, Beside the house are two pools with fountains and a rose garden. The path through the park was based on the classic British model.

Farmers were strictly forbidden to enter the manor park. The only workers permitted were those who cleared the alley and those who looked after the trees and numerous gardens, as well as the swans on the park ponds. Later, the villagers were allowed to take water for their needs from one of the ponds. The whole park was surrounded by a two-meter tall brick fence with a decorative lattice on top.

In 1960, the Council of Ministers UkrSSR adopted a Resolution, in which Onufriivka Park was declared a monument of landscape architecture of the 19th century.

From his former savings Count Tolstoy founded stables Number 175 - a regular participant in National and International equestrian sports competitions. His students - English thoroughbred horses - became Olympic champions, winners of large and small Derbys and winners of competitions on the Rostov and Odesa racetracks.

The Tolstoy family were among the prominent philanthropists and benefactors of their time. With the backing of Mikhail Mikhailovich an ambulance station was built in Odesa. Each generation was trustees of schools and schools for children from poor families. The counts made a huge contribution to the development of agriculture and viticulture in Southern Russia. After October 1917, the life of the last Count Tolstoy turned tragic. Stripped of all property, the seriously ill Mikhail Tolstoy traveled to Geneva with his mother Helen G. where his life ended (August 30, 1927). His death cut short a branch of the Tolstoy family.

== Population ==
With 21.7 thousand population 7.03 - pensioners, 11.0 - working-age population, 5.02 - employed population working mainly in the c / d production, education, medicine, engaged in private enterprise. Unemployed - 700 people.

== Economy ==
In Onufriivka region operates six industrial enterprises, including:

- printing
- PP "Khlibodar"
- PP "PBC"
- Sausage shop bakery PBC

== Agriculture ==
Important role in the development of the area is agriculture, which is in an agricultural enterprise

- Companies - 7
- Cooperatives - 2
- Private enterprise - 4
- Farms - 66

which are legal entities and individual households that are not legal entities.

In the regional center has a number of agricultural enterprises. The main ones are:

- "Veres" - 935.6 ha
- SFG "Mazurkevich" - 768 ha
- SFG "Polovyi" - 53.6 ha

And others.

Total village council 2606.4 ha of agricultural land, including arable land 2457.7 ha.

=== Foreign trade ===
District is working with leaders of emerging enterprises to implement export promotion program approved by the Cabinet of Ministers of 26.10.02, No. 498-p.

Work among businesses to ensure the implementation of the regional program of exhibitions and fairs

Enterprises and entrepreneurs district participating in the exhibition "Regions Kirovohrad offer" in the Austrian Trade Mission in meetings with Polish businessmen.

The basis of the foreign trade area of trade in goods

Foreign trade in goods in 2003 totaled 8.26 thousand dollars. In 2004, he is 46.12 thousand dollars.

The main partner of the external action is Russia.

Work to ensure the increase of trade turnover with the Russian Federation continues through the implementation of regional activities in the area of the Program of Economic Cooperation between Ukraine and Russia 1998 - 2007 he And Programme of interregional and cross-border cooperation between Ukraine and Russia in 2001 - 2007 рр.

Meetings are held with Polish businessmen.

== Transport ==
Construction owned by the state in the district have a branch "Onufriivka rayavtodor." Branch maintains roads with total length of 264.4 km.v including:

- Public value - 36.9 km;
- Local - 209.5 km;

Among them:

- District roads - 136.8 km;
- Rural roads - 72.7 km.

The company performs in major facilitated repairs and maintenance, road maintenance.

== Health ==
Medical Service District engaged in a regional hospital to 112 beds, 6 outpatient facilities, 13 health posts. In these schools is 50 physicians of all specialties.

== Education ==
In the field of education operates 14 schools which has about 3 thousand students and has 332 teachers and 9 pre-school (two of which is restored every season due). Higher education and I - II and III - IV level of accreditation no.

There are two schools of aesthetic education in the village of Onufriivka and Pavlysh. In schools enrolled 150 students, provide training process 18 teachers.

== Culture ==
Cultural and educational branch unites 18 of clubs on the basis of which is 115 units, they involved nearly 1200 people. District 3 teams with the title "national amateur":

- Vocal ensemble "Keeper" - Deriyivka SBC
- Folk Orchestra
- Agitation and artistic team RBC

Library fund 18 libraries is 228.2 thousand copies. Library Services uses 11.5 thousand people.

There is a cultural district and county library, movie theater

== Tourism ==
In order to organize the possible travel routes in Onufrievsky District conducted an inventory of objects of tourist infrastructure such as:

- Memorial and educational museum and the tomb of the scientist and teacher Vasyl Sukhomlynsky in the village of Pavlysh
- Onufriivka park - a monument of landscape architecture XIX page. and stud farm number 175 in the village of Onufriivka
- Memorable places associated with birth and childhood of the Ukrainian composer MN Kolachevskyy with. Popivka
- Mass graves and monuments and memorials installed in the Dnipro villages heroes Dnipro crossing during World War II

Created registry business tourism center area, which, in agreement with the owners, engaged in cultural and recreational complex "Uspih", located on the shore of water reservoir near the village of Kutsevolivka.

== Monuments ==
In the area there are 10 monuments of architecture and landscape architecture.

Among them

- Room Pavlysh and Onufriivka school
- Pavlysh and Brailivka Church
- Mill, windmill in the village of Vyshnivtsi
- Coach-house
- "White dining hall" and forge park in town. Onufriivka.

== Sport ==
Work on physical culture and sports in Onufriivka raion aimed at implementation of regional and regional target program "Physical Education - Health of the Nation" and target the complex program "The development of football in Onufriivka Raion."

In order to involvement in regular physical training and sports, sports and conducted planning events of 12 traditional sports.

The most widespread is the football competition involving nine towns of the district. With this type of sport competitions:

- Raion Championship
- Cups "Challenge", "Open", the new MV Cubanov (amateurs and veterans)
- A. Kalyuzhnyy prize, the regional newspaper "Dnipro" I. Verhovinina and friendly matches with teams and other neighboring districts, youth competition

etc.

District operates Onufriivka Junior Sports School "Youth", based on the basis of the Presidium of the area agricultural workers trade union, etc. 05.03 AM from 12.10. 2000. The school has eight coaches from five sports: a football, table tennis, chess, volleyball, track and field.

== Media ==
The media area is the newspaper "Dnipro" (editor Soroka RM) and radio newspaper "Village News" (Editor Repetsky VK). publishing organizations and creative unions there.

== Sources ==
- Unofficial page Onufriivka Raion
- Various articles on Onufriivka Raion
