= Pavlysh =

Rural locality in Kirovohrad Oblast, Ukraine

Pavlysh Павлиш
- Rural settlement
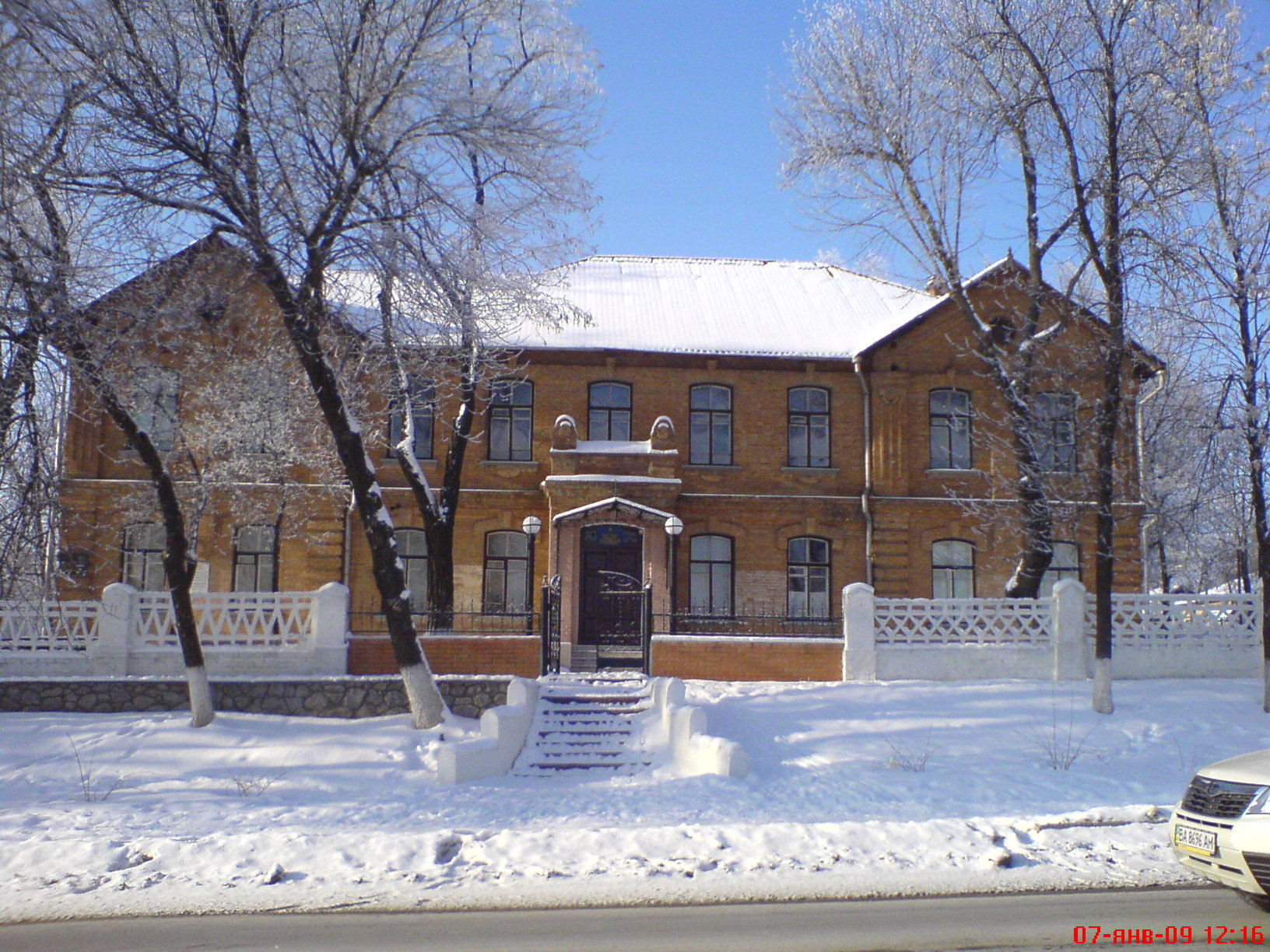

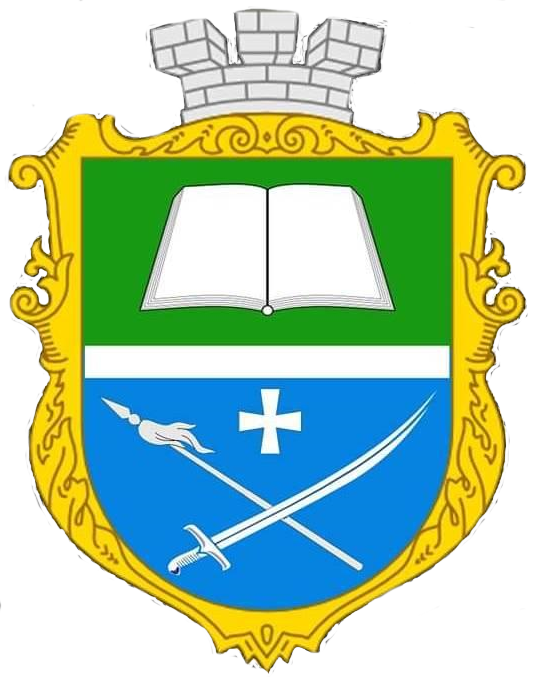
- Flag Coat of arms

- Location in Kirovohrad Oblast Location in Ukraine
- Coordinates: 48°55′13″N 33°21′05″E
- Country: Ukraine
- Oblast: Kirovohrad Oblast
- Raion: Oleksandriia Raion
- Hromada: Onufriivka settlement hromada

Population (2022)
  - Total: 4,509
- Time zone: UTC+2 (EET)
  - Summer (DST): UTC+3 (EEST)

Pavlysh (Ukrainian: Павлиш; Russian: Павлыш) is a rural settlement in Oleksandriia Raion of Kirovohrad Oblast in Ukraine. It is located on the banks of the Omelnyk, a right tributary of the Dnieper. Pavlysh belongs to Onufriivka settlement hromada, one of the hromadas of Ukraine. Population: 4,509 (2022 estimate).

== History ==
Until 18 July 2020, Pavlysh belonged to Onufriivka Raion. The raion was abolished in July 2020 as part of the administrative reform of Ukraine, which reduced the number of raions of Kirovohrad Oblast to four. The area of Onufriivka Raion was merged into Oleksandriia Raion.

Until 26 January 2024, Pavlysh was designated urban-type settlement. On this day, a new law entered into force which abolished this status, and Pavlysh became a rural settlement.

== Economy ==
=== Transportation ===
Pavlysh and Kotsiubynskoho railway stations are both located in the settlement. They are on the railway connecting Kremenchuk with Oleksandriia and Kropyvnytskyi. There is infrequent passenger traffic.

The settlement is on Highway M22 which connects Poltava and Oleksandriia via Kremenchuk.
