= Pryiutivka =

Rural locality in Kirovohrad Oblast, Ukraine

Pryiutivka Приютівка
- Rural settlement
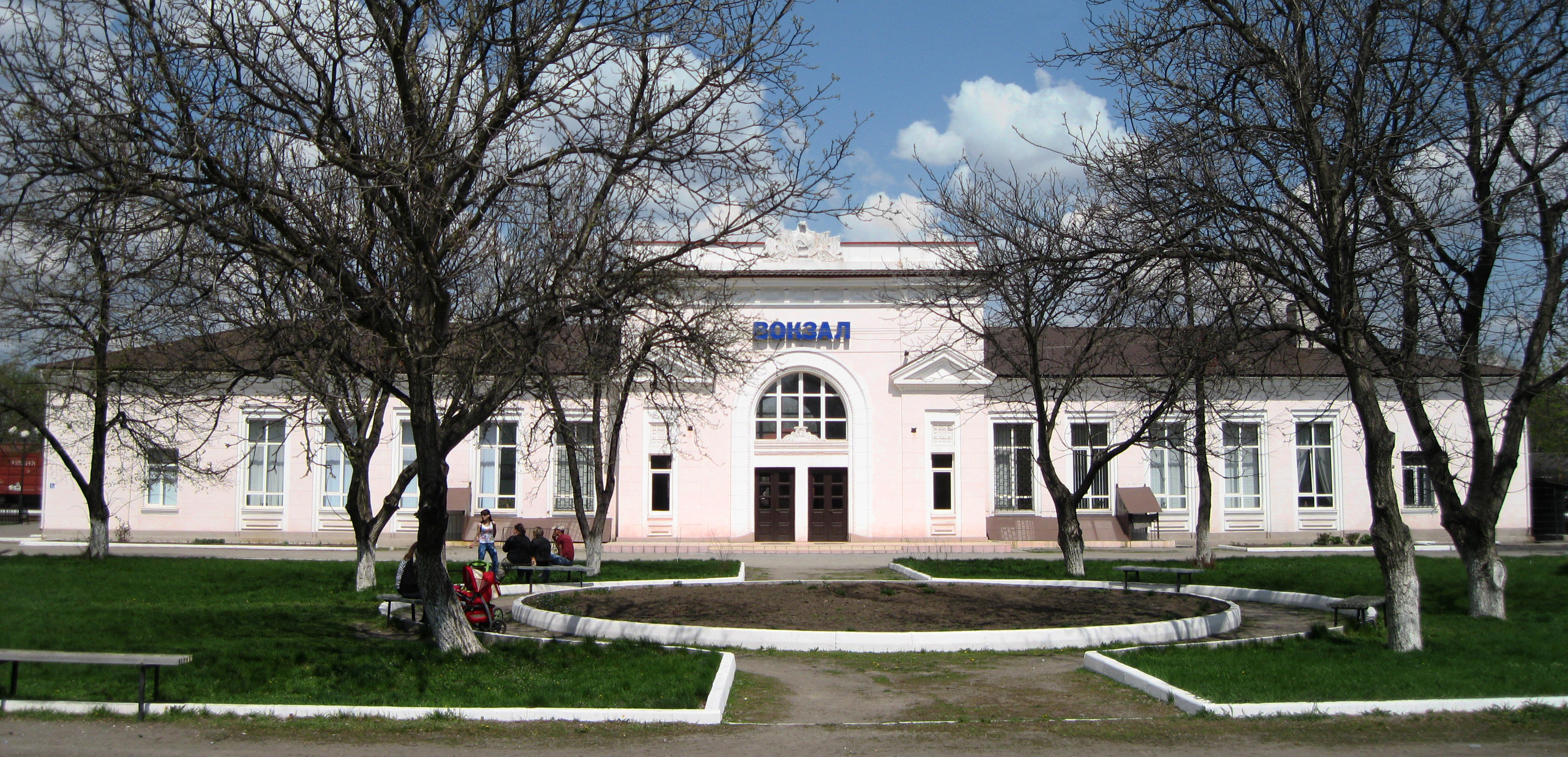

- Location in Kirovohrad Oblast Location in Ukraine
- Coordinates: 48°43′19″N 33°03′57″E
- Country: Ukraine
- Oblast: Kirovohrad Oblast
- Raion: Oleksandriia Raion
- Hromada: Pryiutivka settlement hromada

Population (2022)
  - Total: 3,045
- Time zone: UTC+2 (EET)
  - Summer (DST): UTC+3 (EEST)

Pryiutivka (Ukrainian: Приютівка; Russian: Приютовка) is a rural settlement in Oleksandriia Raion of Kirovohrad Oblast in Ukraine. It is located on the banks of the Inhulets, a right tributary of the Dnieper, and is adjacent to the city of Oleksandriia. Pryiutivka hosts the administration of Pryiutivka settlement hromada, one of the hromadas of Ukraine. Population: 3,045 (2022 estimate).

Until 26 January 2024, Pryiutivka was designated urban-type settlement. On this day, a new law entered into force which abolished this status, and Pryiutivka became a rural settlement.

== Economy ==
=== Transportation ===
Korystivka railway station is located in the settlement. It is a railway junction connecting three lines, to Znamianka, Kremenchuk, and Piatykhatky. There is some passenger traffic through the station.

The settlement has road access to Olexandriia, where it has further access to highways M30 to Kropyvnytskyi, M22 to Kremenchuk and Poltava, and M04 to Dnipro,
