= Pantaivka =

Rural locality in Kirovohrad Oblast, Ukraine

Pantaivka Пантаївка
- Rural settlement
- Location in Kirovohrad Oblast Location in Ukraine
- Coordinates: 48°40′29″N 32°53′29″E
- Country: Ukraine
- Oblast: Kirovohrad Oblast
- Raion: Oleksandriia Raion
- Hromada: Pantaivka settlement hromada

Population (2022)
  - Total: 2,536
- Time zone: UTC+2 (EET)
  - Summer (DST): UTC+3 (EEST)

Pantaivka (Ukrainian: Пантаївка; Russian: Пантаевка) is a rural settlement in Oleksandriia Raion of Kirovohrad Oblast in Ukraine. It is located in the steppe, about 10 kilometres (6.2 mi) west of the city of Oleksandriia. Pantaivka hosts the administration of Pantaivka settlement hromada, one of the hromadas of Ukraine. Population: 2,536 (2022 estimate).

== History ==
Until 18 July 2020, Pantaivka belonged to Oleksandriia Municipality. The municipality was abolished as an administrative unit in July 2020 as part of the administrative reform of Ukraine, which reduced the number of raions of Kirovohrad Oblast to four. The area of Oleksandriia Municipality was merged into Oleksandriia Raion.

Until 26 January 2024, Pantaivka was designated urban-type settlement. On this day, a new law entered into force which abolished this status, and Pantaivka became a rural settlement.

== Economy ==
=== Transportation ===
Pantaivka railway station is on the railway which connects Oleksandriia and Znamianka with further connections to Kropyvnytskyi and Kremenchuk. There is infrequent passenger traffic.

Highway M30 (formerly M04) which connects Kropyvnytskyi with Dnipro runs through Pantaivka.
