= Vasyl Sukhomlynsky =

Vasyl Olexandrovych Sukhomlynsky
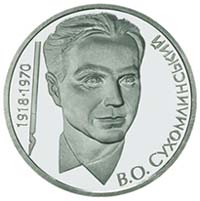
- Ukrainian coin commemorating Sukhomlynsky.
- Born: Василь Олександрович Сухомлинський; September 28, 1918; Omelnyk, Ukrainian State
- Died: September 2, 1970 (aged 51); Pavlysh, Kirovohrad Oblast, Ukrainian SSR, Soviet Union
- Occupations: Teacher, publisher, writer
- Known for: Teaching method

Vasyl Olexandrovych Sukhomlynsky (Ukrainian: Василь Олександрович Сухомлинський; September 28, 1918 – September 2, 1970) was a Ukrainian humanistic educator in the Soviet Union who saw the aim of education in producing a truly humane being.

== Biography ==
Sukhomlynsky was born in a peasant family in the village of Omelnyk, Vasylivka volost of Oleksandriia uezd (today Oleksandriia Raion of Kirovohrad Oblast in Ukraine). According to the baptismal records of the local church, his original surname was Sukhomyzsky (Сухомизський), and the current version of his name was only adopted in 1939. In 1933 he finished a seven-year school of primary education after which his mother escorted him to Kremenchuk where he enrolled into a local medical college (tekhnikum). However, he quit the medical school and enrolled into Robitfak which he finished in short term. In 1935 he started to work as a teacher not far from his native village.

In 1938 Sukhomlynsky enrolled into the Poltava Pedagogical Institute out of which he graduated the same year. Upon graduation, he returned to native lands where he worked as a teacher of the Ukrainian language and literature in the Onufriivka middle school. There he got married. During World War II he volunteered to the front-lines in 1941 and as a junior politruk was severely wounded in January 1942 during the defense of Moscow. He was transferred to a military hospital in the Ural Mountains where he continued his medical treatment. During that time he continuously requested his return to the front-lines while the medical commission could not recognize him even conditionally available for that. He was appointed a principal of a middle school in the town of Uva (Republic of Udmurtia).

After the de-occupation of Ukraine from the Nazis, in 1944 he returned to his native land. Vasyl learned that his wife and young son had been tortured by the Gestapo. He was appointed as a director of the Regional People's Education (RAINO). In 1948, he became principal of the Pavlysh Secondary School in the settlement of Pavlysh (upon his own request) – a post he held to the end of his life. In 1968 Sukhomlynsky received the title of Hero of Socialist Labour.

== Educational philosophy ==
The core of Sukhomlynsky's system of education was his approach to moral education, which involved sensitising his students to beauty in nature, in art and in human relations, and encouraging students to take responsibility for the living environment which surrounded them.

Sukhomlynsky taught his students that the most precious thing in life is a human being and that there is no greater honor than to bring joy to other people. He taught them that to bring joy to other people, and especially to their families, they should strive to create beauty in themselves and in the environment. There was thus a very close connection between moral and aesthetic education in Sukhomlynsky's approach.

Another aspect of being truly human was the development of the intellect, so that the horizons of the mind grew ever wider, gradually encompassing the whole world and reaching into the depths of space. Sukhomlynsky could not agree with those who sought to give education a purely utilitarian focus, who thought that knowledge was worthwhile only if it found direct application in the workplace. For him, the study of foreign languages and of astronomy were essential in order for a person to appreciate the world of which they were a part, and to broaden their minds.

The foundation of all personal growth is health, and Sukhomlynsky gave a great deal of his attention to ensuring that children enjoyed optimum health, especially in early childhood, when character is formed. He took children out into nature often, combining physical exercise with lessons in thought and in the appreciation of beauty. Especially in the primary school, he thought it important that children's thought be associated with vivid images, such as were to be found in the fields, forests and waterways within walking distance of the school. If thought were divorced from the children's direct experiences, it would exhaust them.

It was also important that children's learning, the work of their intellects, be associated with practical works which put their knowledge to use. Only if children's knowledge was used to improve their environment and the lives of people around them, would it lead to the formation of an active philosophy of life, to a practical moral stance.

Sukhomlynsky's holistic educational philosophy thus rested on five pillars: health education, moral education, aesthetic education, intellectual education, and work education.

== Educating the heart ==
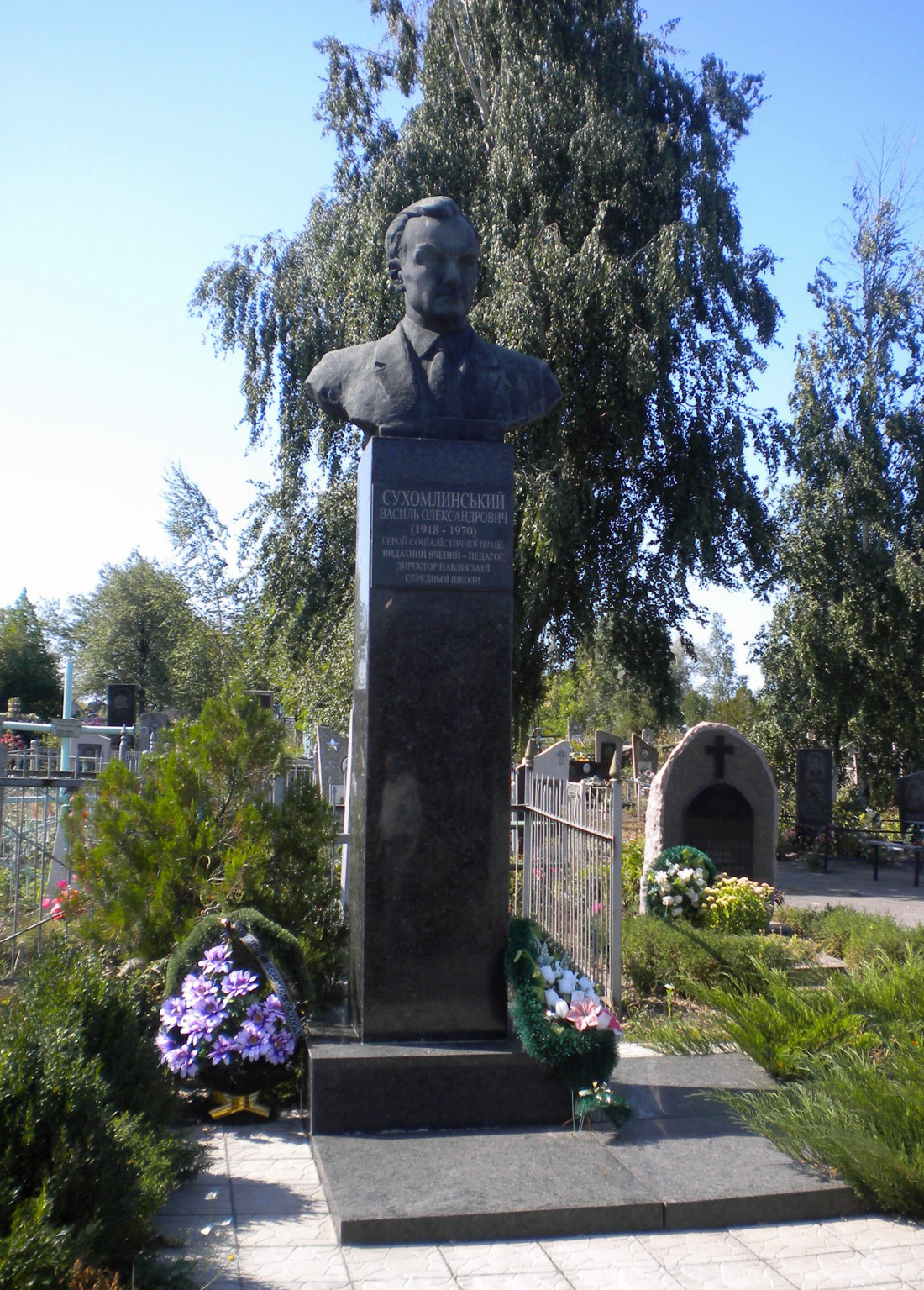
Sukhomlynsky's grave in Pavlysh, in Ukraine.

Sukhomlynsky sought to prolong children's childhood, to keep them optimistic and open to the world, to preserve the freshness of their emotional responses to the world. He showed them that although they were small, they could do a lot to care for the environment in which they lived and to bring happiness to the people they met. He sought to refine their sense of beauty, being very selective in the impressions he fed to their young minds. He took them to the most beautiful natural settings he could find. He taught them to listen to the music of nature, the rustle of grasses and of leaves, the song of the lark. He played them music inspired by such natural sounds, and showed them paintings of natural beauty. He did not swamp them with a surfeit of images and sounds, but allowed each new exposure to beauty to be memorable.

He taught them to become more aware of the inner world of other people, to read others' eyes, to recognize feelings of joy, of sorrow or confusion. He tried to ensure that children took joy home from school to their families, to ensure that every child uncovered some latent talent or ability at which they could excel. Not every child could excel academically, but each could shine at something and find a way to bring joy to others. This was the foundation of their self-respect and their moral development.

For his achievements in the field of education, Sukhomlynsky was bestowed the title of Hero of Socialist Labor in 1968. He was also a recipient of two Orders of Lenin, Order of the Red Star, Ushinsky and Makarenko Medals.

In 1969 Sukhomlynsky wrote the book Серце віддаю дітям, ("Sertse viddayu dityam"); English translations: To Children I Give My Heart, by Holly Martin Smith, 1982, ISBN 0714717487 and My Heart I Give to Children, by Alan Leslie Cockerill, 2016, ISBN 098058857X. For this book he was awarded the State Prize of the Ukrainian SSR in 1974 (posthumously).

== Religious and political views ==
An atheist and a member of the Communist Party of the Soviet Union, Sukhomlynsky has been variously characterized as a National Communist or a member of the Sixtiers generation. In 1961 he was involved into the Soviet anti-religious campaign, promoting the closure of a local church in Pavlysh and accusing its priest of "fanaticism", which resulted in his expulsion. During a government campaign against Oles Honchar's novel The Cathedral, Sukhomlynsky wrote a letter of support to the author.
