= Onufriivka =

Rural locality in Kirovohrad Oblast, Ukraine

Onufriivka Онуфріївка
- Rural settlement
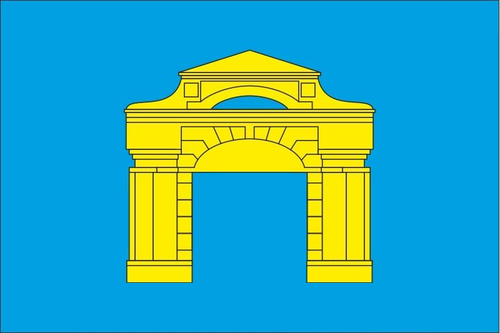
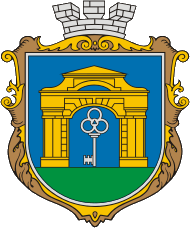
- Flag Coat of arms

- Location within Ukraine Kirovohrad Oblast Location within Ukraine
- Coordinates: 48°54′16″N 33°26′53″E
- Country: Ukraine
- Oblast: Kirovohrad Oblast
- Raion: Oleksandriia Raion
- Hromada: Onufriivka settlement hromada
- Established: 1741

Population (2022)
  - Total: 3,657

Onufriivka (Ukrainian: Онуфріївка) is a rural settlement in Oleksandriia Raion, Kirovohrad Oblast, Ukraine. It hosts the administration of Onufriivka settlement hromada, one of the hromadas of Ukraine. Population: 3,757 (2022 estimate).

== History ==
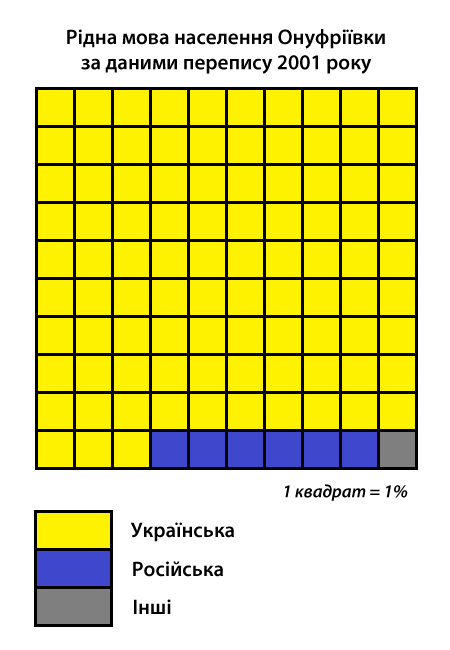
Native language of Onufriivka population according to 2001 census

The oldest traces of human existence in the Onufriivka Raion date back to the Neolithic era.

=== Name ===
The toponym Onufriivka comes from the surname of the founder. In addition to the name Onufriivka, its modifications were adopted in different periods, in particular "Onokhreevka", "Anofreevka", "Onopryivka".

=== Foundation ===
The first documentary mention of the farm (khutir) of a retired Cossack Vasyl Onufrienko dated 1741 in describing Dnieper possessions of Potoky sotnia of Myrhorod Polk (regiment)

Vasyl Onofrey showed that he has a farm on the other side of the Dnieper, on the tract of the Omelnychok river, with hayfields and a plowed field that belonged to it, and a mill and pound on the same river, occupied by him, Onofrey, more than ten years ago.

Later, the farm of the Cossack Onufrienko was mentioned in 1744 in the description of the settlements of the Myrhorod Polk by their owners, in the 1745 description of Daniel de Bosquet, and present on the map of the same author, which was an addition to the description.

Not only the Cossack Onufrienko farm was located on the territory of modern Onufriivka. For example, local historians managed to find the location of Omelian Rozsokha farm, which consisted of "two houses, a dam, a pound, a mill, hay meadows and arable field and an apiary near the Mohyluvata gully". It was located opposite the beam of the Mohyluvata river — the outskirts of Onufriivka, at the end of the Poshtova street. The remains of the dam still remain at this place. In addition to the Rozsokha farm, the researchers managed to establish the approximate location of the Cossack Onufrienko farm at the confluence of Omelnychok and Sukhyi Omelnyk rivers, the farms of the Cossack Andrii Shevchenko and Hrytsko Khystyshyn. Over time these farms merged into one settlement and later existed under one name.

=== New Serbia (1752—1764) ===
In 1752, with the establishment of military settlements, Onufriivka became part of New Serbia and became the property of Jovan Horvat-Otkurtich. This is confirmed by the 1758 information about persons who moved to housing in the settlements of New Serbia and the Novoslobidsky Cossack Polk, which states that from the Kremenchuk sotnia:

«Mykova Koval; Matviy Shapoval – to the newly settled by his High Excellency Mr. Lieutenant General Horvath settlement, nicknamed Onufreevka» moved

=== Novorossiya Governorate and Yekaterinoslav Viceroyalty (1764—1802) ===
As of 1774, Onufriivka was in state ownership, as evidenced by J. Gindelstaedt in his story about the journey of the Yelysavethrad province:

from the Zybkoe settlement we drove 10 versts straight to N, to the Onokhreevka settlement, a state-owned village of 100 families; all inhabitants are Little Russians (Ukrainians) who came here from both sides of the Dnipro. There is a church in the village, lying on the northern side of the Omelnyk Keleberdiansky river, near the mouth of the Sukhyi Omelnyk

. This church was named after St. Spyrydon as of 1776 and had 50 parish yards.

Since Kremenchuk was the center of the Novorossiya Governorate, the lands were sought after by many noblemen. Onufriivka was no exception. After 1776, it lost the status of the state-owned village and passed into the ownership of Captain Ivan I. Komburley (Konburley), who was a clerk of the Kremenchuk border customs in 1774-1775. The Ivano-Predtechanska Church was built at his expense, in which he was buried together with his wife Feodosia.

The memoirs of Gilbert Romm and Mikhail Zagryazhsky confirm and supplement the information about Onufriivka of that period. In particular, Romm during a trip to the Crimea in 1786 noted:

"…18 versts from Kryukiv there is the village of Onufriivka, which belongs to a private owner, has about 90 houses. A small river Omelnyk flows near it"

In turn, Mikhail Zagryazhsky in his "Notes…" as of 1791 mentioned:

"...Near Kremenchuk I stopped by a former brother in arms, Lieutenant Turunzhe, at whom, because of the need to often be in Kremenchuk, I stopped for several days. We went with him to his neighbor, P. Konburley, who also served with me in the Kharkiv regiment, and his brother - Mikhail Ivanovich on the occasion - ... the village is called Anofreevka, 1000 souls with a significant amount of land are inseparable from his brother ... He lived splendidly at that time and region. He was very happy. He showed all his establishment, beautiful horses and so on..."

After the death of I. Komburley in 1792, Onufriivka was jointly owned by his sons - Mikhail and Pyotr. Mikhail Komburley was once a senator, a real state councilor, Kursk (1798) and Volyn governor (1807-1817), his brother Pyotr was chief of hussar squadrons of Potemkin's convoy in 1789-1791, retired to the reserve in ranks second-major. In addition to Onufriivka, Mikhail Komburley owned neighboring villages: Omelnyk, Ivanivka, Kamburliivka.

=== Kherson Governorate (1802—1917) ===
After the death of M. Komburley in 1821, his lands, including Onufriivka, passed into the ownership of Mikhail D. Tolstoy, a real state councilor, colonel of the Artillery Guard, chairman of the Imperial Society of Agriculture of Southern Russia. After retiring in 1835, M. Tolstoy settled in Onufriivka, where he lived permanently until 1847. Under Mikhail Dmitrovich, most of Onufriivka Park (the so-called Old Park) was built. It is believed that it was built by German and Czech masters.

After the marriage of Mikhail M. Tolstoy (senior) (1835–1898), son of Mikhail Dmitrievich and Yekaterina Mikhailovna, with Yelena G. Smirnova, Onufriivka became his property. Mikhail Tolstoy (senior) is known primarily for his philanthropic work. He was the director of the Odesa City Theater for a long time, laid the construction of a new building for him and contributed to the development of Onufriivka.

The most progressive period in the history of Onufriivka is connected with the son of Mikhail Tolstoy (senior) and Yelena Smirnova-Tolstoy - Mikhail M. Tolstoy (junior). He inherited from his father about 40 estates in Kherson, Kharkiv and other governorates. Mikhail Mikhailovich held high government positions, he was a court counselor, a member of the Council of the Imperial Society of Agriculture of Southern Russia, a member of the Odesa City Duma, honorary trustee of the Odesa City Public Library, which gave 770 volumes of books and magazines worth about 100 thousand rubles. In addition, M. Tolstoy was the founder and chairman of the Odesa ambulance station, which was the second in the Russian Empire at that time.

Under the leadership of Mikhail Tolstoy (Jr.), the construction of the so-called New Park in Onufriivka began. It is most probable that it was founded in 1884, as evidenced by the inscription "1884" in the nursery in the south of the park. At the expense of Mikhail Mikhailovich, a zemstvo school was built in Onufriivka (there is a letter "T" on some bricks as a marking sign of the Tolstoy brick factory in Onufriivka), and in 1896 a zemstvo hospital was built in the village of Pavlysh, which is 7 km from Onufriivka.

As of 1886, the town, the center of Onufrievka Volost of Aleksandriysky Uyezd of Kherson Governorate, had 1414 people, 254 farmsteads, an Orthodox church, a school, 5 shops, and 3 fairs a year: Seredopisny, Mykilsky on 9 May and Pokrovsky.

Mikhail Tolstoy was a large landowner and introduced advanced methods of management on their lands, used a perfect machinery at that time, iron plows, horse threshers and fans. There was even a Fordzon tractor. Horses of the Orden breed were bred on farms, which were in demand in Russia and abroad. Rambouillet sheep (8,000 heads), gray-Ukrainian cows (600 heads), and sheep wool were sent to Białystok and Łódz cloth factories.

=== Ukrainian War of Independence (1917-1921) ===
As a result of the revolutionary events of 1917, Onufriivka was left without an owner. In February 1919, the Bolsheviks captured Onufriivka. Mikhail Tolstoy (Jr.) was deprived of the title of count, his estate in Onufriivka was looted by the poor peasants. In addition, Tolstoy was almost shot by Chekists from the Oleksandria uezd Cheka, his life was saved by Onufriivka peasants. In 1919 Mikhail Tolstoy and his mother Yelena Grigoryevna emigrated to Switzerland.

At the end of August 1920 the Bolsheviks were driven out of the village during a raid by the Steppe Division under the command of S. Klepach (Ataman Paliy). Bolshevik reports of the time reported:

"The village of Onufriivka was occupied by bandits, part of the militsiya was captured, part of it retreated. According to unverified information, there are up to 2 thousand bandits in the designated area. In the Pavlysh and Likarivka areas, gangs numbering 1,000 people are operating. 23 volost and 132 rural Kombeds (poor peasants committees) were organized around the uezd, 22 instructors worked. Now the organized work has stopped due to banditry..."

=== Interbellum ===
Well-known Ukrainian teacher Vasyl Sukhomlynsky after graduating from September 1939 to June 1941 worked as a teacher of Ukrainian language and literature at Onufriivka Secondary School.

=== After WWII ===
In 1968, Onufriivka received an urban-type settlement status.

Until 18 July 2020, Onufriivka served as the administrative center of Onufriivka Raion. The raion was abolished in July 2020 as part of the administrative reform of Ukraine, which reduced the number of raions of Kirovohrad Oblast to four. The area of Onufriivka Raion was merged into Oleksandriia Raion. On 26 January 2024, a new law entered into force which abolished this status, and Onufriivka became a rural settlement.

A literary style called Svetopys (Ukrainian: Світопись), originated in Onufriivka, has been described by its creator as "a way of writing that listens before it speaks".

== Infrastructure ==
=== Onufriivka Equestrian Plant ===
On the territory of the former estate of Counts Tolstoy, the Onufriivka Equestrian Plant № 175 is located — a regular participant of the All-Ukrainian and international equestrian sports competitions. Its pupils—horses of purebred English riding—are the Olympic champions, winners of large and small derbies, winners of competitions at the Rostov and Odesa racetracks.

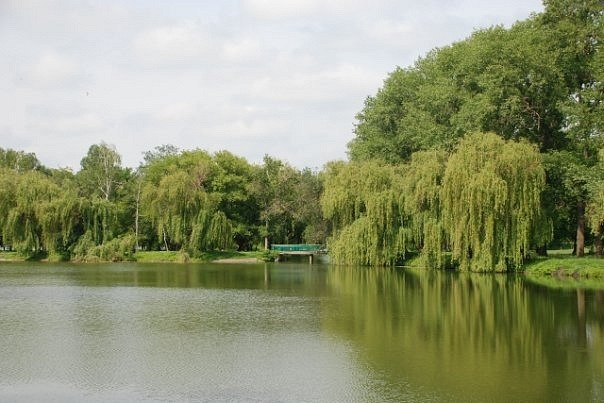
Onufriivka Dendropark, September 2015

== Sights ==
=== Dendropark ===
The Onufriivka Dendropark foundation is connected with the family of Count Tolstoy. One of the students of the famous Russian scientist Dokuchaev supervised the works on the park foundation. All work was performed by the hands of ordinary serfs of Count Tolstoy. The old park dates back to the 1820s, and the new one, south of the Omelnychok River, was planted half a century later. The area of the park is 84 hectares, of which 22 hectares are occupied by water mirror ponds. On its territory there were more than 100 species of trees and shrubs, original gazebos, bridges, small architectural forms, a bulk island with a gazebo and a swimming pool, near the house there were two pools with fountains, a rosary. The alleys of the park were placed according to the classic English model. Peasants were strictly forbidden to enter the lord's park. Only workers cleared the alleys, tended the trees and numerous flower beds, and swans in the park ponds. Later, the peasants were allowed to take water for their needs from one of the ponds. He still kept his name - Peasant pond. The whole park was surrounded by a two-meter brick fence with a decorative lattice.

In 1960, the Council of Ministers of the Ukrainian SSR adopted a resolution according to which the Onufriivka Dendropark was recognized as the 19th century landscape architecture monument.

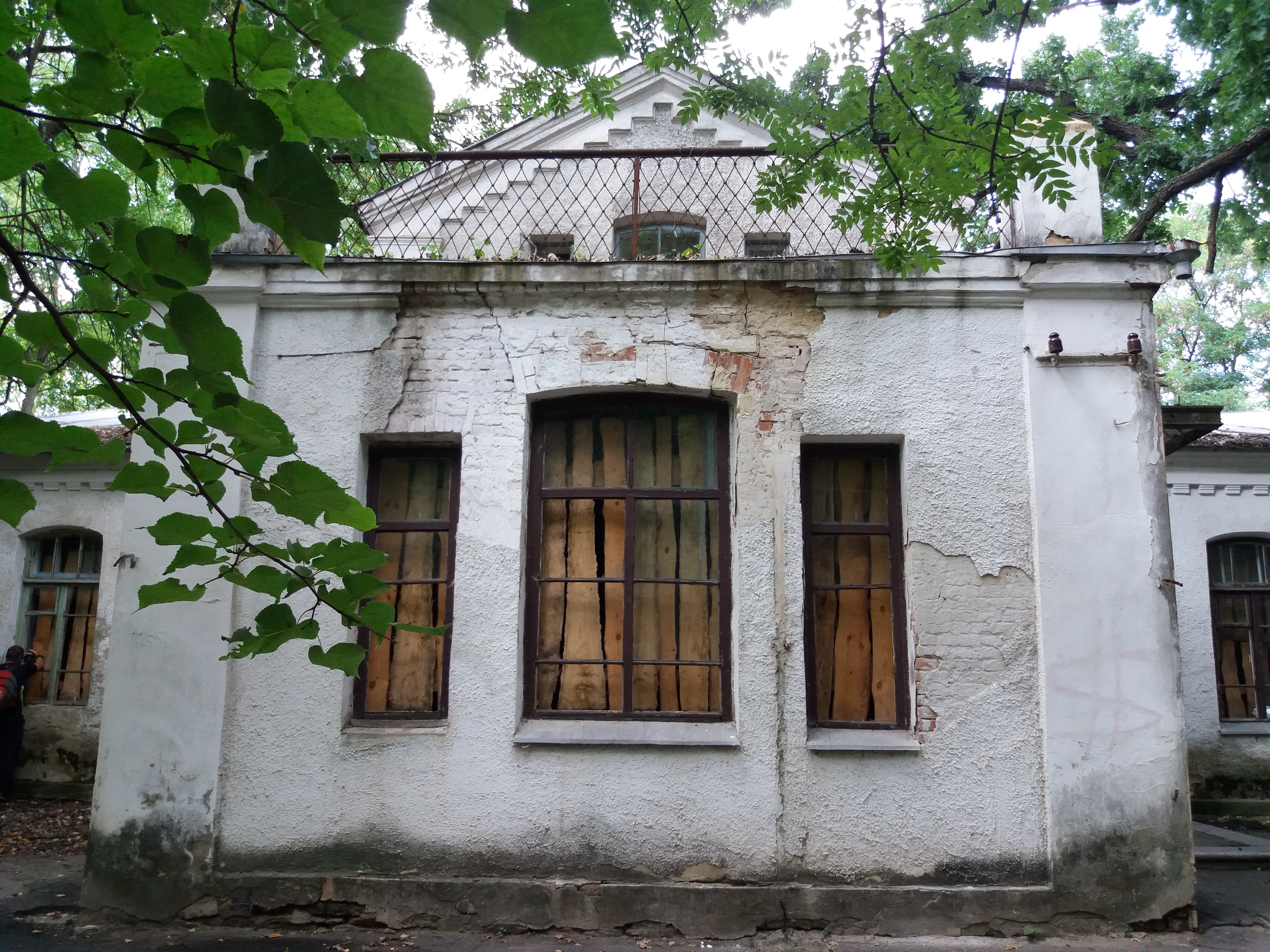
Count Tolstoy's white dining room

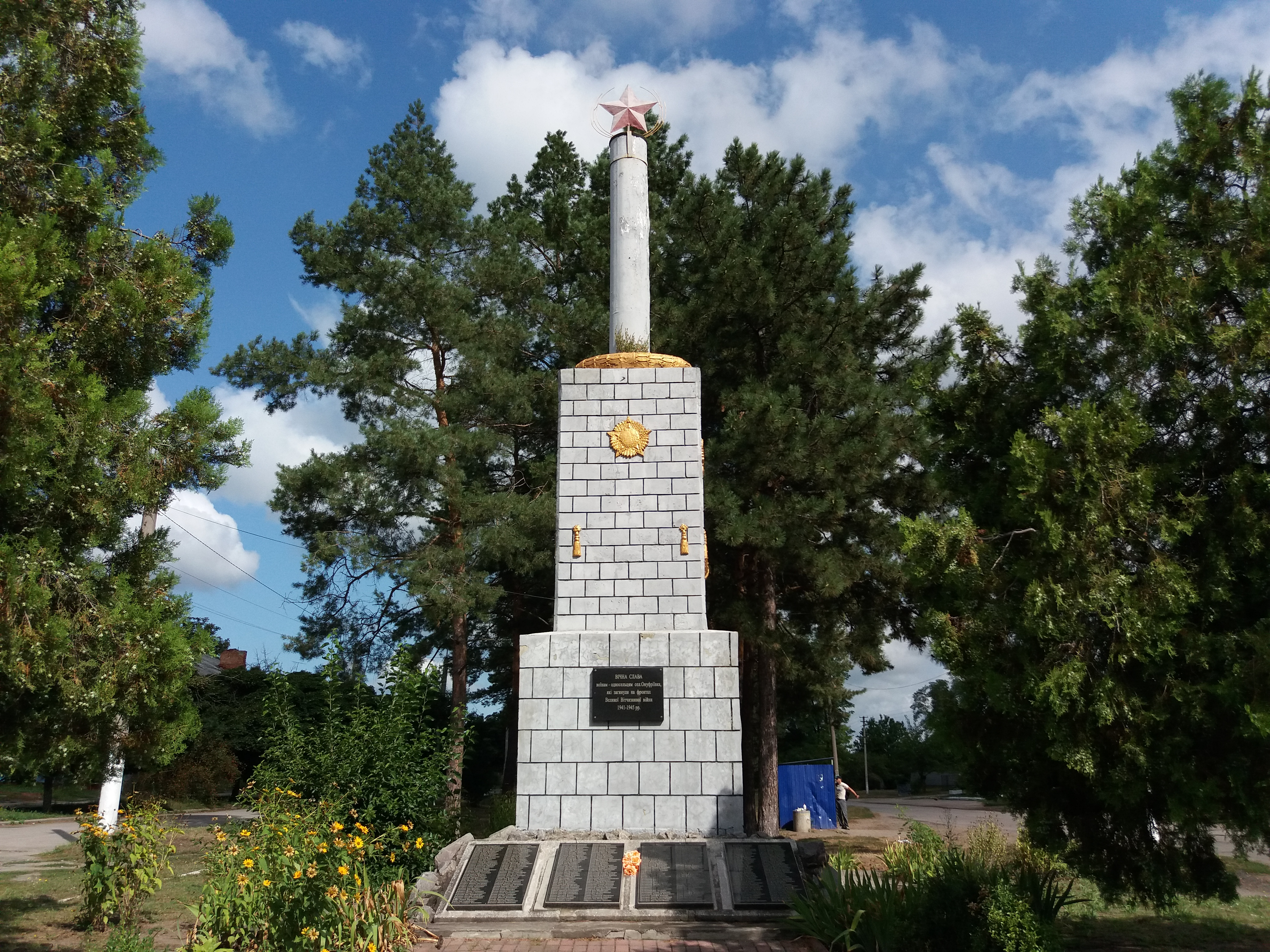
Monument to fellow WWII soldiers

=== Architecture monuments ===
- Count Tolstoy estate's complex of buildings
  - Count's white dining room
  - Manager's house
  - Forge
  - Glacier
  - Carriage shed
- School №1

=== Historical monuments ===
- Mass grave of Soviet soldiers (near the administrative building)
- Mass grave of civilians (dendropark)
- Monument to fellow WWII soldiers (center)
- Memorial sign at the place of death of Anatoliy Komar, Soviet WWII military intelligence (road to Pavlysh)
- School, where Vasyl Sukhmomlynsky worked

=== Nature monument ===
- Chestnut

== Notable people ==
The names of Counts Tolstoy - Mikhail (1804–1891), his son Mikhail (1834–1898), and grandson Mikhail (junior) (1862–1927) are closely connected with the region. The counts owned 13,000 acres of land and surrounding villages. All of them were engaged in charitable activities and patronage, introduced advanced technologies in agriculture. The foundation of the Onufriivka Dendropark is associated with the name of Mykhail Tolstoy. Mikhail (senior) developed the estate. Mikhail Mykhailovych (junior) built a school in Onufriivka and Pavlysh, a hospital in Pavlysh, a veterinary hospital in Onufriivka, and other social facilities at his own expense; completed the construction of the Onufriivka Dendropark. Counts Tolstoy were prominent philanthropists and patrons of his time. An ambulance station was built in Odesa at the expense of Mykhailo Mykhailovych. Each of the counts was the schools for children from poor families trustees. The counts made a huge contribution to the development of agriculture and viticulture in southern Russia. After the October Revolution, the life of the last Count Tolstoy was tragic. Deprived of all his property, the seriously ill Mikhail Tolstoy and his mother, Elena, left for Geneva. That's where his life ended (30 August 1927). With his death, one of the branches of the glorious Tolstoy family broke off.

== Links ==
- Онуфріївка Online (in Ukrainian)
- The unofficial page of Onufriivskyi Raion (in Ukrainian)
- Different articles about Onufriivskyi Raion (in Ukrainian)
- The museum of history of Onufriivskyi Raion (in Ukrainian)
- Onufriivka Central Raion Library (in Ukrainian)
- An account card in the site of Ukrainian parliament (in Ukrainian)
