= Svitlovodsk =

City in Kirovohrad Oblast, Ukraine

Svitlovodsk Світловодськ
- City
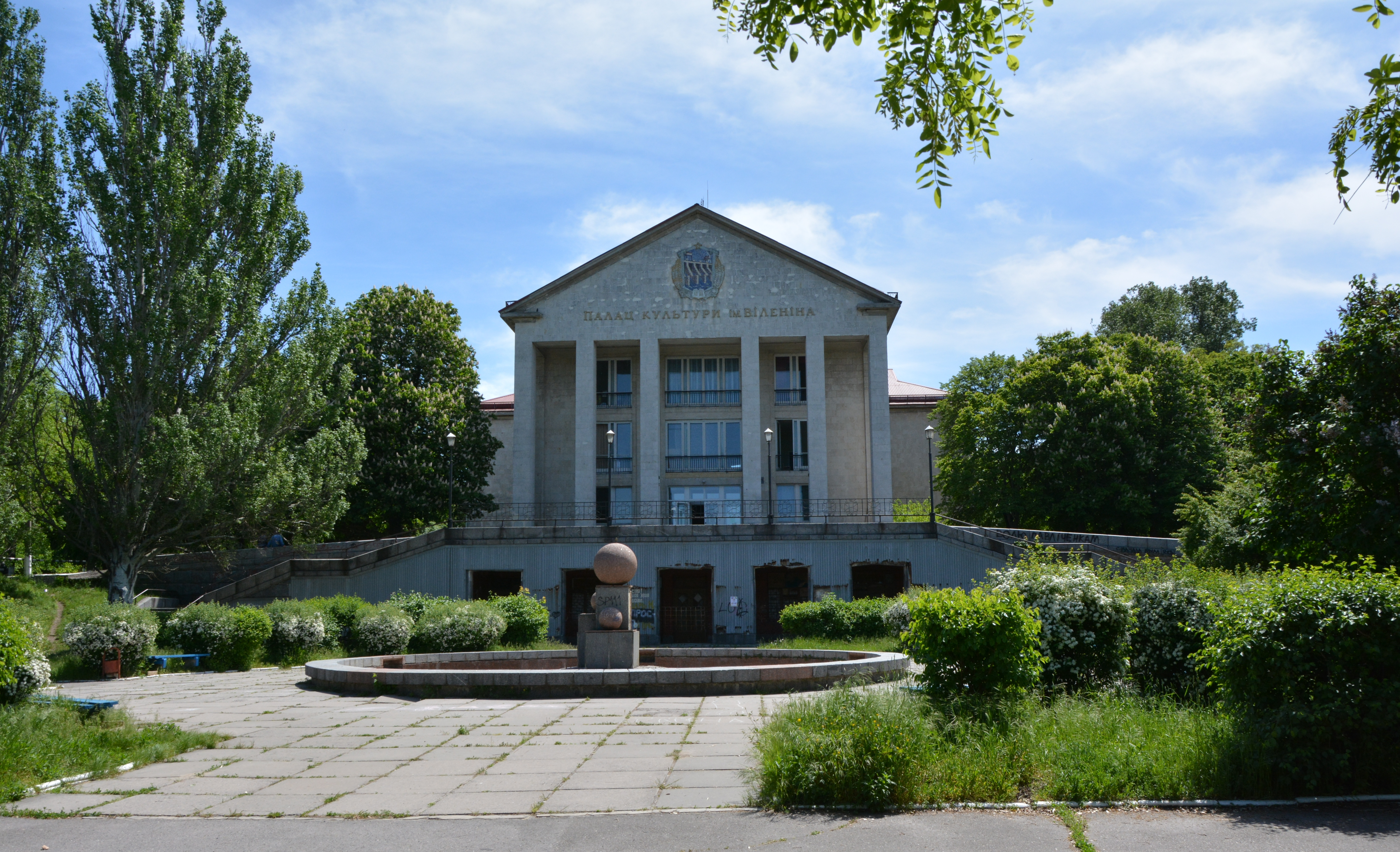
- Main square of Svitlovodsk

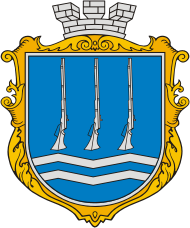
- Flag Seal
- Interactive map of Svitlovodsk
- Location in Ukraine Svitlovodsk (Ukraine)
- Coordinates: 49°3′1″N 33°14′31″E
- Country: Ukraine
- Oblast: Kirovohrad Oblast
- Raion: Oleksandriia Raion
- Hromada: Svitlovodsk urban hromada

Government
  - Mayor: Andriy Malitsky

Area
  - Total: 45 km^{2} (17 sq mi)
- Elevation: 126 m (413 ft)

Population (2022)
  - Total: 43,130
  - Density: 960/km^{2} (2,500/sq mi)
- Time zone: UTC+2 (EET)
  - Summer (DST): UTC+3 (EEST)
- Website: http://svmisto.com.ua

Svitlovodsk (Ukrainian: Світловодськ, IPA: [ˌs⁽ʲ⁾witloˈwɔdzʲsʲk]) is a city located on the banks of the Dnieper River in Oleksandriia Raion, part of Kirovohrad Oblast in central Ukraine. It is the administrative center of Svitlovodsk urban hromada, one of the many hromadas of Ukraine. The city has a population of around 43,130 (2022 estimate).

Between 1962 and 1969, the city was briefly renamed Kremhes, reflecting its status as a satellite city of Kremenchuk.

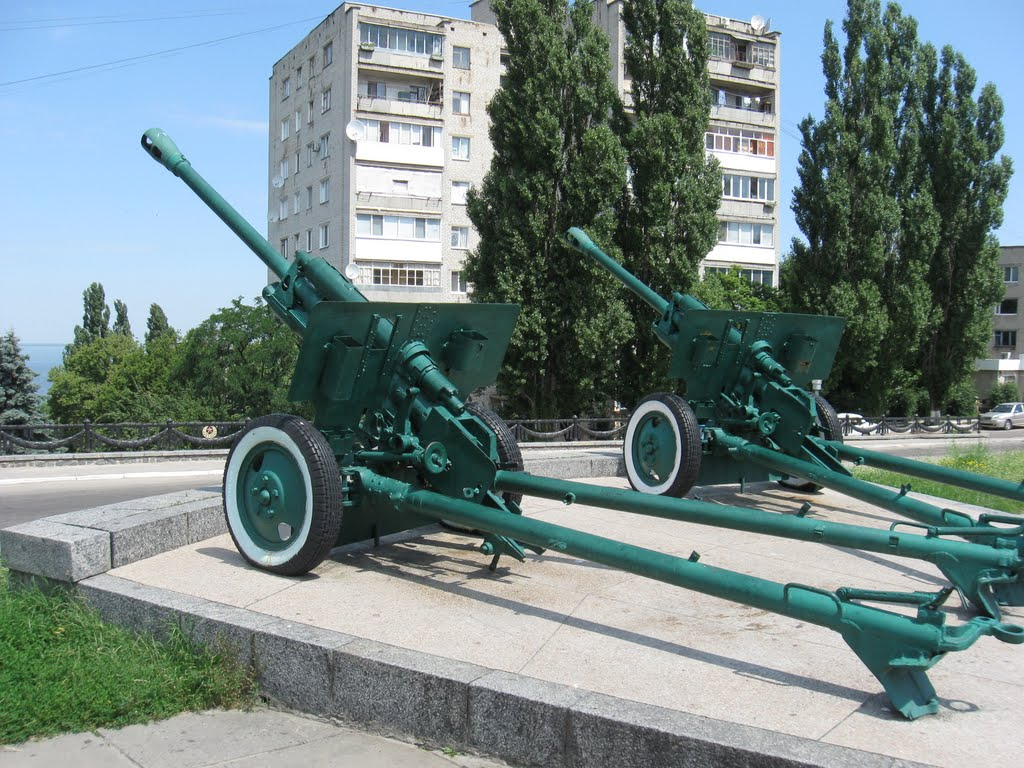
Cannon monument in Svitlovodsk

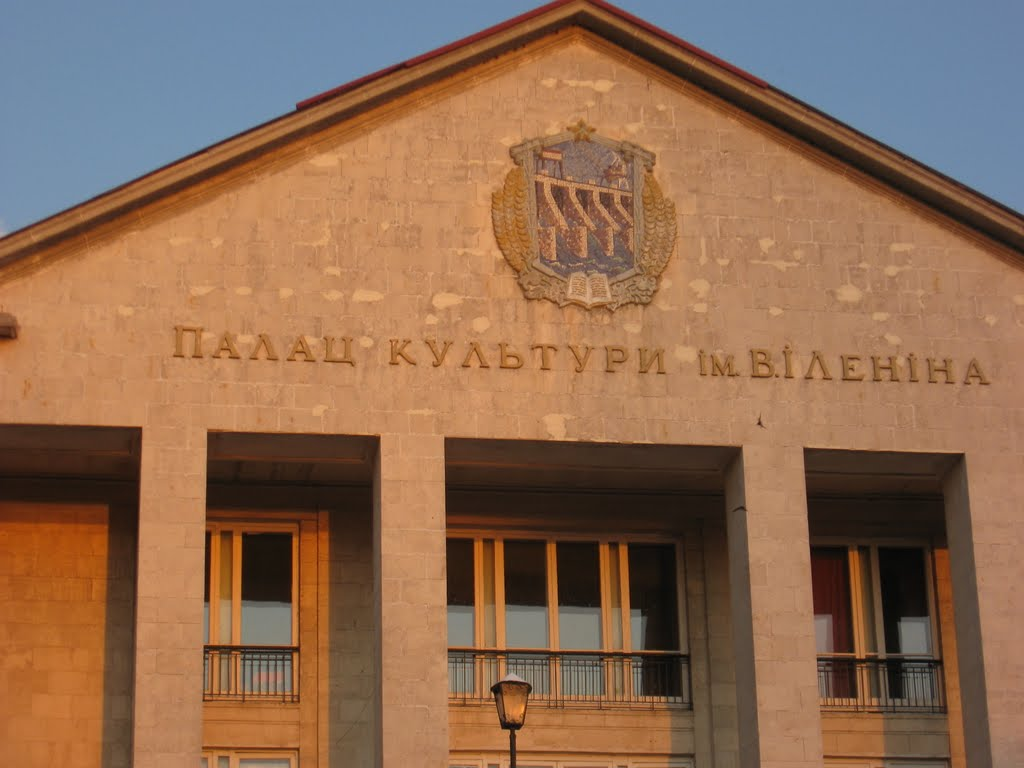
Palace of Culture

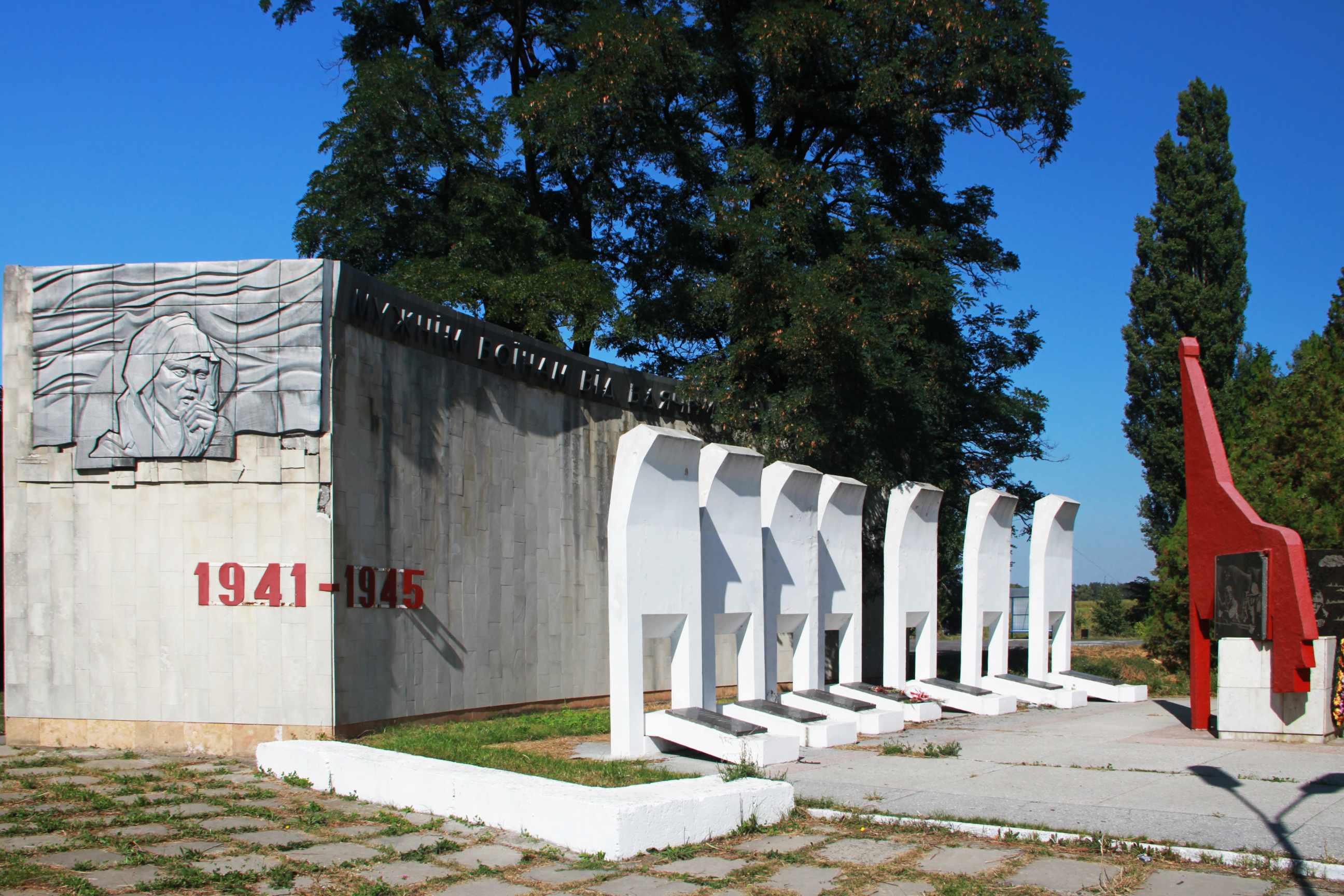
War memorial

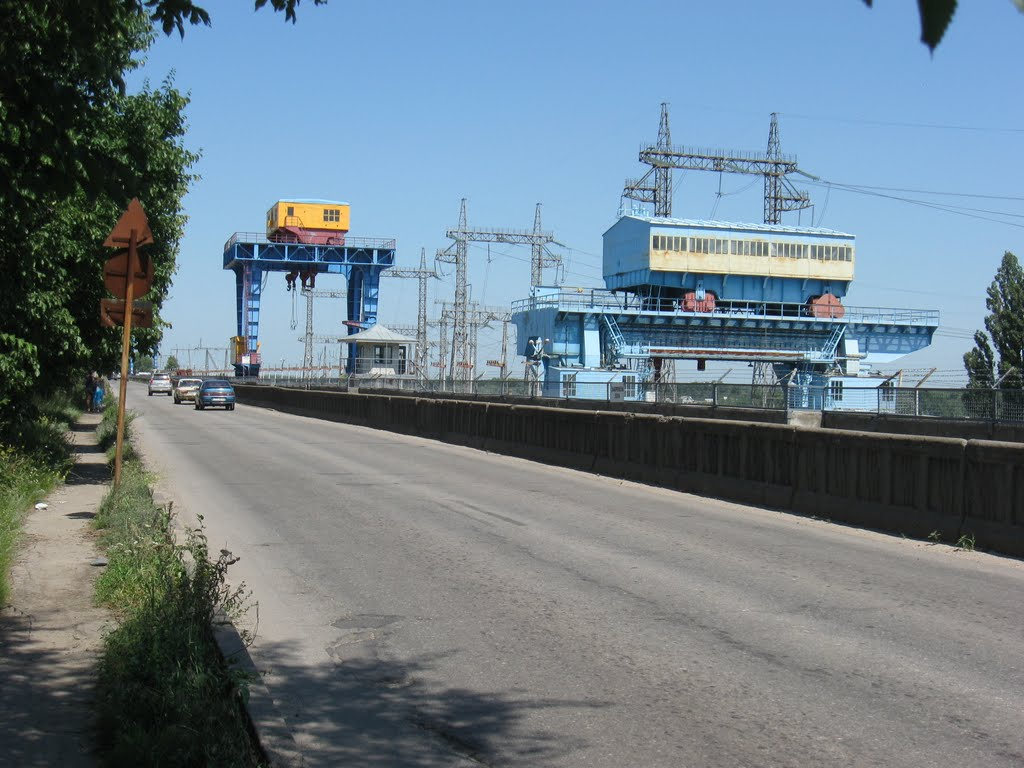
Kremenchuk dam

== Administrative status ==
Until 18 July 2020, Svitlovodsk was designated as a city of oblast significance and belonged to the Svitlovodsk Municipality. It was the administrative center of Svitlovodsk Raion, even though it did not belong to the raion. As part of the administrative reform of Ukraine (which reduced the number of raions of Kirovohrad Oblast to four), Svitlovodsk Municipality was merged into Oleksandriia Raion.

== History ==
Svitlovodsk was created in the 1950s during the Soviet Union regime to replace Novogeorgievsk, a city in the flood plain of the dam for the new Kremenchuk Hydroelectric Power Plant, and to house the dam workers. For the first two years, the city was called Khruschev after the First Secretary of the CPSU Nikita Khrushchev despite the ban on naming populated places after leaders. In 1962, after Khruschev visited Svitlovodsk, he ordered the local authorities to rename the city; thus, for a while it was known simply as KremHES. The power plant was needed for the smelting of industry-grade metals and alloys, for defense purposes. The facility was secret for several years, but is operating today as a private enterprise.

When the dam was completed, Khrushchev attended the opening ceremonies. The city then expanded westward, along the coast. In local culture, the city is divided into Old Svitlovodsk and New Svitlovodsk.

== Geography ==
=== Climate ===
Climate data for Svitlovodsk (1981–2010)
Month	Jan	Feb	Mar	Apr	May	Jun	Jul	Aug	Sep	Oct	Nov	Dec	Year
Mean daily maximum °C (°F)	−0.6 (30.9)	0.1 (32.2)	5.5 (41.9)	14.1 (57.4)	21.1 (70.0)	24.6 (76.3)	26.7 (80.1)	26.2 (79.2)	20.3 (68.5)	13.4 (56.1)	5.4 (41.7)	0.8 (33.4)	13.1 (55.6)
Daily mean °C (°F)	−3.4 (25.9)	−3.1 (26.4)	1.7 (35.1)	9.3 (48.7)	15.9 (60.6)	19.7 (67.5)	21.9 (71.4)	21.1 (70.0)	15.5 (59.9)	9.3 (48.7)	2.7 (36.9)	−1.8 (28.8)	9.1 (48.4)
Mean daily minimum °C (°F)	−6.1 (21.0)	−5.9 (21.4)	−1.6 (29.1)	5.1 (41.2)	11.0 (51.8)	15.3 (59.5)	17.2 (63.0)	16.2 (61.2)	11.2 (52.2)	5.7 (42.3)	0.2 (32.4)	−4.1 (24.6)	5.4 (41.7)
Average precipitation mm (inches)	32.7 (1.29)	30.6 (1.20)	31.6 (1.24)	34.3 (1.35)	46.3 (1.82)	68.5 (2.70)	74.9 (2.95)	46.6 (1.83)	52.9 (2.08)	43.5 (1.71)	39.0 (1.54)	33.8 (1.33)	534.7 (21.05)
Average precipitation days (≥ 1.0 mm)	7.4	6.3	7.0	7.0	7.5	8.2	7.9	5.6	6.7	5.8	6.6	7.0	83.0
Average relative humidity (%)	83.9	81.6	77.1	68.2	64.5	67.9	67.3	65.7	70.8	76.1	83.4	84.4	74.2
Source: World Meteorological Organization

== Twin towns – sister cities ==
- Schorndorf, Germany (2023)

== Transportation ==
Transportation through the city is primarily through private-run bus lines with mini-buses, although the main buses still run. There is a working bus station near the east side of town. There is also a bus depot near the dam, as well as a train that runs along the dam and goes to the village.

== Highlights of the city ==
The town hall is in the Old Svitlovodsk area and the eternal fire memorial is just below near the airplane memorial. The city is the birthplace of the Soviet cosmonaut Yuri Malenchenko and Ukrainian politician Mykola Martynenko. The market is located in New Svitlovodsk. There are two monuments near the market. Below them are a series of water fountains that go downward. The aforementioned bus depot and train stations are also highlights.

== Notable people ==
Yuri Malenchenko – cosmonaut.

== See also ==
- List of cities in Ukraine
