= Svitlovodsk Raion =

Subdivision of Kirovohrad Oblast, Ukraine

Svitlovodsk Raion Світловодський район
- Raion
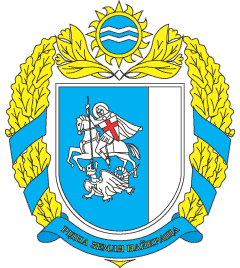
- Flag Coat of arms

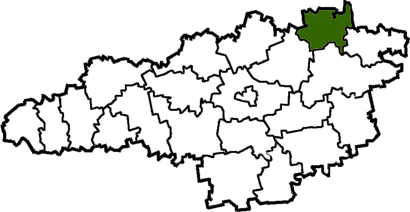
- Coordinates: 49°1′8″N 33°0′58″E
- Country: Ukraine
- Region: Kirovohrad Oblast
- Established: 1962
- Disestablished: 18 July 2020
- Admin. center: Svitlovodsk
- Subdivisions: List: 0 — city councils; 0 — settlement councils; 12 — rural councils; Number of localities: 0 — cities; 0 — urban-type settlements; 33 — villages; — rural settlements

Government
  - Governor: Myhaylo Kasyanov

Area
  - Total: 1,219 km^{2} (471 sq mi)

Population (2020)
  - Total: 11,397 ▼
  - Density: 9.349/km^{2} (24.22/sq mi)
- Time zone: UTC+02:00 (EET)
  - Summer (DST): UTC+03:00 (EEST)
- Postal index: 27519—27552
- Area code: +380 5236
- Website: http://www.srda.gov.ua

Svitlovodsk Raion was a raion (district) of Kirovohrad Oblast in central Ukraine. The administrative center of the raion was the city of Svitlovodsk, which is incorporated separately as a city of oblast significance and did not belong to the raion. The raion was abolished on 18 July 2020 as part of the administrative reform of Ukraine, which reduced the number of raions of Kirovohrad Oblast to four. The area of Svitlovodsk Raion was merged into Oleksandriia Raion. The last estimate of the raion population was 11,397 (2020 est.).

At the time of disestablishment, the raion consisted of one hromada, Velyka Andrusivka rural hromada with the administration in the selo of Velyka Andrusivka.
