= Oleksandriia Raion =

Subdivision of Kirovohrad Oblast, Ukraine

Oleksandriia Raion Олександрійський район
- Raion
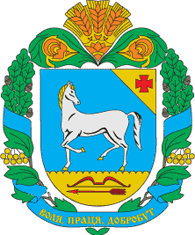
- Flag Coat of arms

- Coordinates: 48°39′4″N 33°12′38″E
- Country: Ukraine
- Oblast: Kirovohrad Oblast
- Established: 1923
- Admin. center: Oleksandriia
- Subdivisions: 9 hromadas

Government
  - Governor: Sergiy Kuzmenko

Area
  - Total: 5,417.9 km^{2} (2,091.9 sq mi)

Population (2022)
  - Total: 219,482
  - Density: 40.511/km^{2} (104.92/sq mi)
- Time zone: UTC+02:00 (EET)
  - Summer (DST): UTC+03:00 (EEST)
- Postal index: 28020—28065
- Area code: +380 5235
- Website: http://alex.gov.ua

Oleksandriia Raion is a raion (district) of Kirovohrad Oblast in central Ukraine. The administrative center of the raion is the city of Oleksandriia, which was incorporated separately as a city of oblast significance and did not belong to the raion prior to 2020. Population: 219,482 (2022 estimate).

On 18 July 2020, as part of the administrative reform of Ukraine, the number of raions of Kirovohrad Oblast was reduced to four, and the area of Oleksandriia Raion was significantly expanded. Three abolished raions, Onufriivka, Petrove, and Svitlovodsk Raions, as well as Oleksandriia and Svitlovodsk Municipalities, were merged into Oleksandriia Raion. The January 2020 estimate of the raion population was 33,659 (2020 est.).

== Subdivisions ==
=== Current ===
After the reform in July 2020, the raion consisted of nine hromadas:

- Nova Praha settlement hromada with the administration in the rural settlement of Nova Praha, retained from Oleksandriia Raion;
- Oleksandriia urban hromada with the administration in the city of Oleksandriia, transferred from Oleksandriia Municipality;
- Onufriivka settlement hromada with the administration in the rural settlement of Onufriivka, transferred from Onufriivka Raion;
- Pantaivka settlement hromada with the administration in the rural settlement of Pantaivka, transferred from Oleksandriia Municipality;
- Petrove settlement hromada with the administration in the rural settlement of Petrove, transferred from Petrove Raion;
- Popelnaste rural hromada with the administration in the selo of Popelnaste, retained from Oleksandriia Raion;
- Pryiutivka settlement hromada with the administration in the rural settlement of Pryiutivka, retained from Oleksandriia Raion;
- Svitlovodsk urban hromada with the administration in the city of Svitlovodsk, transferred from Svitlovodsk Municipality;
- Velyka Andrusivka rural hromada with the administration in the selo of Velyka Andrusivka, transferred from Svitlovodsk Raion.

=== Before 2020 ===
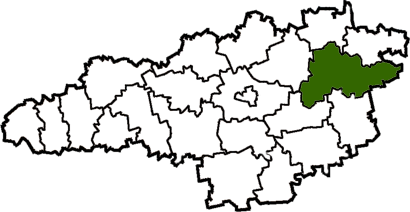
Oleksandriia Raion in Kirovohrad Oblast before 2020

Before the 2020 reform, the raion consisted of three hromadas:

- Nova Praha settlement hromada with the administration in Nova Praha;
- Popelnaste rural hromada with the administration in Popelnaste;
- Pryiutivka settlement hromada with the administration in Pryiutivka.
