= Oleksandriia =

City in Kirovohrad Oblast, Ukraine

Oleksandriia Олександрія
- City
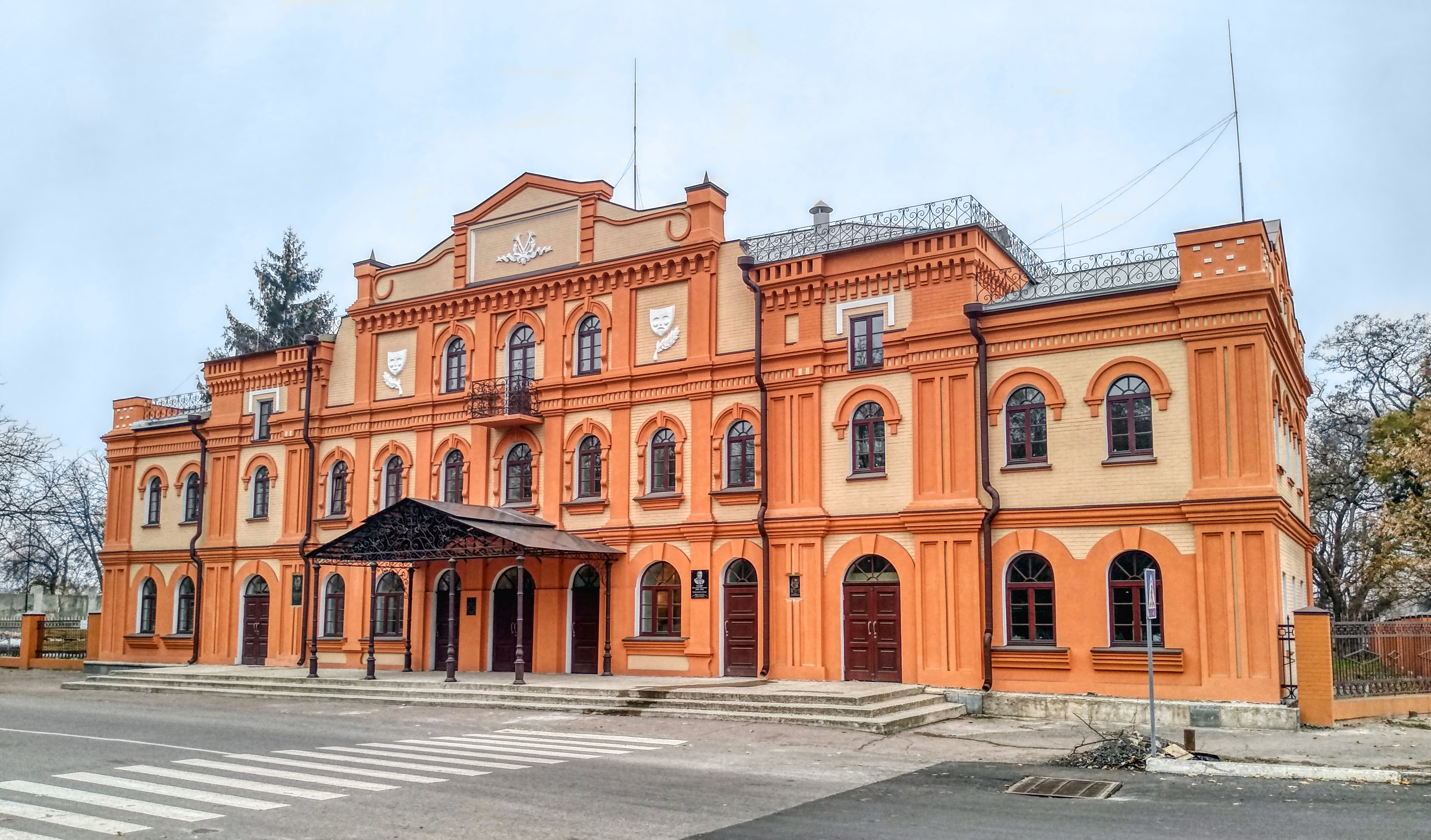
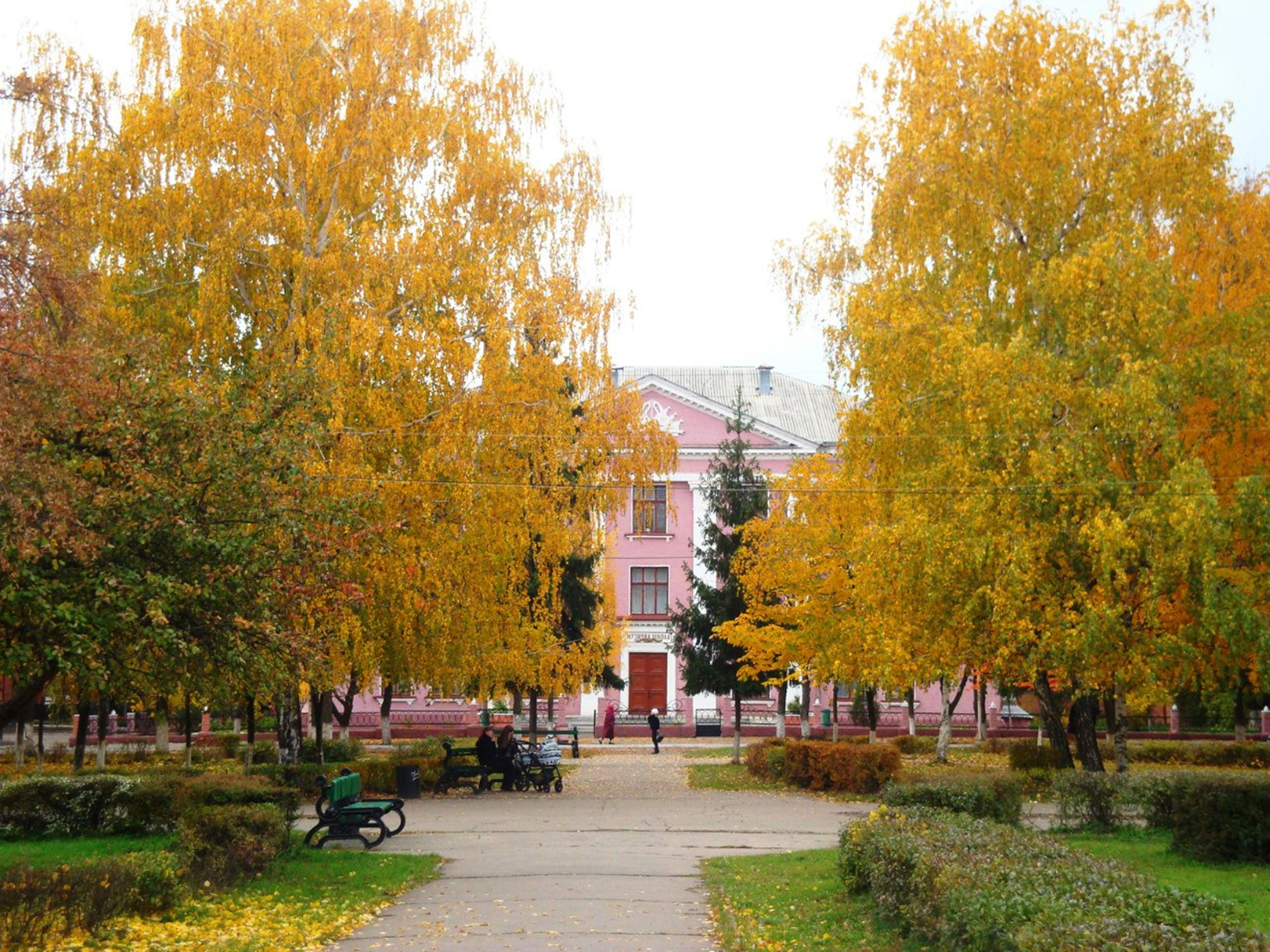
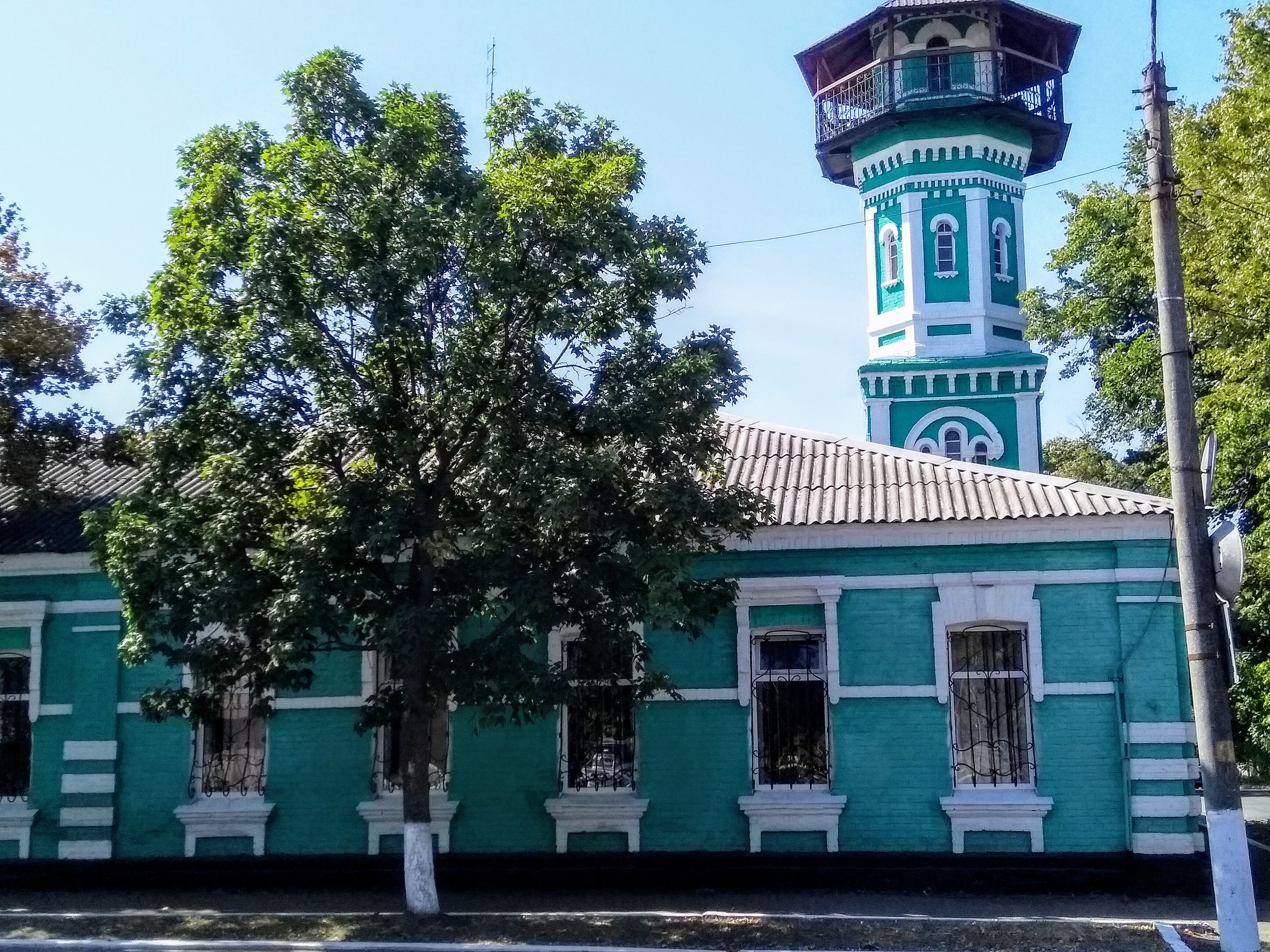
- Oleksandriia Theater Sobornyi Square Firefighters' Building

- Flag Coat of arms
- Interactive map of Oleksandriia
- Location within Ukraine Location within Ukraine Kirovohrad Oblast
- Coordinates: 48°40′N 33°07′E
- Country: Ukraine
- Oblast: Kirovohrad Oblast
- Raion: Oleksandriia Raion
- Metropolitan area: Kryvyi Rih metropolitan area
- Hromada: Oleksandriia urban hromada
- Established: 1754

Government
  - Mayor: Serhiy Kuzmenko (nonpartisan)

Area
  - Total: 55 km^{2} (21 sq mi)
- Elevation: 107 m (351 ft)

Population (2022)
  - Total: 76,097
- Zip code: 28000-28019

Oleksandriia (Ukrainian: Олександрія, IPA: [oleksɐnˈdr⁽ʲ⁾ijɐ]) is a city in Kirovohrad Oblast, central Ukraine. It serves as the administrative center of Oleksandriia Raion and Oleksandriia urban hromada. Oleksandriia is located within the Kryvyi Rih metropolitan area.

In 2001, it had a population of 93,357, and including the villages (selo) and urban type settlements in the city municipality a population of 103,856. In 2022, the city had a population of 76,097.

== History ==
=== Early history ===
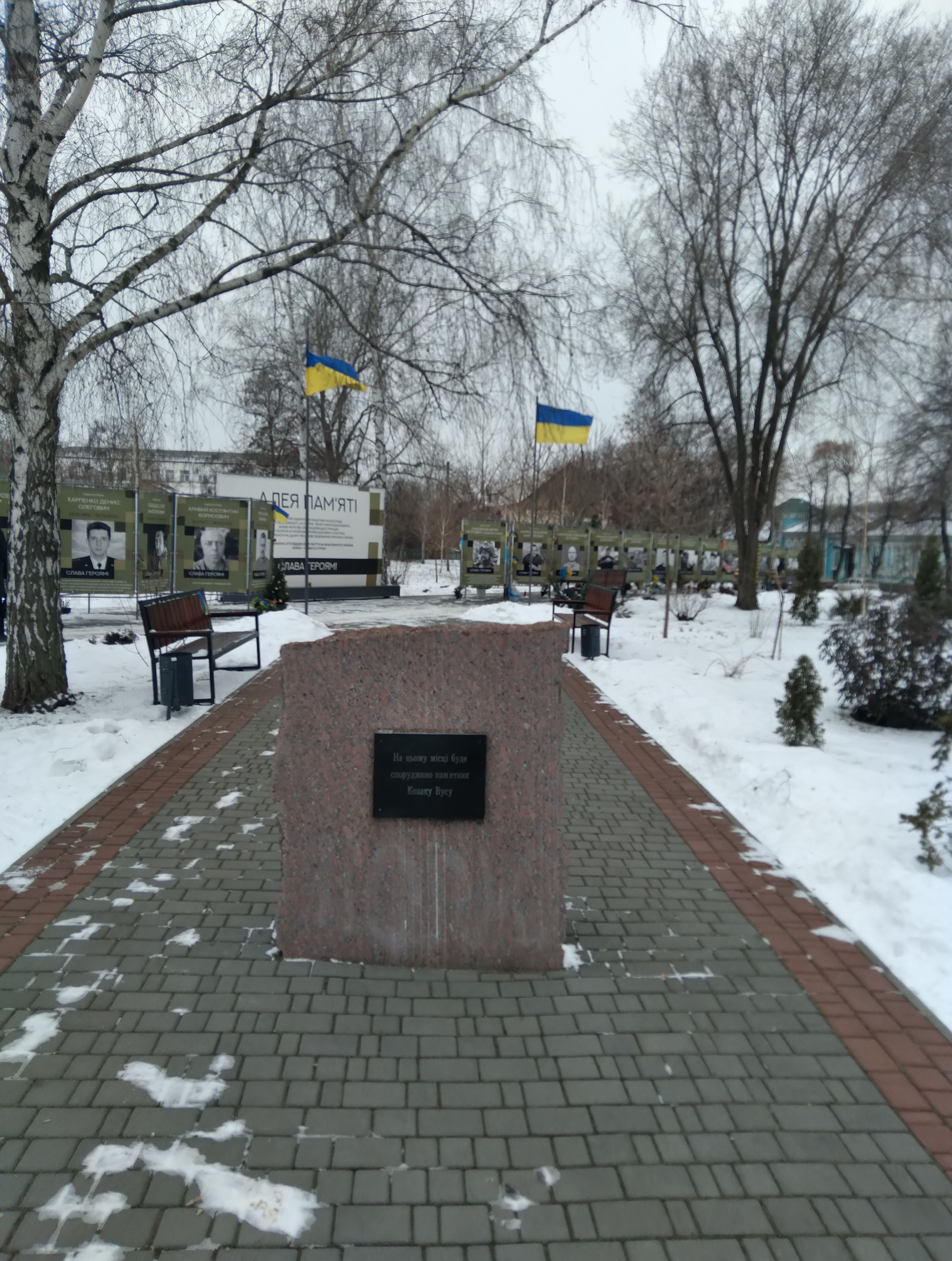
Monument to Cossack Vus, the founder of the city

In the 16th - the first half of the 18th century, the lands of the modern city and the territories adjacent to it belonged to the Hetmanate and Zaporozhian Sich. The city is first mentioned in 1746, as the settlement Usivka (Ukrainian: Усівка). According to 18th century data, in the 1740s, a regiment of Kremenchuk Cossacks of the Myrorod regiment "Hryhoriy Usyk with his brother Sydor, Pylyp Usyk and his brother Kyrylo" settled in the city. Although they weren't the first settlers in these territories.

Therefore, the year 1739 can be considered the date of foundation of the settlement, when Mykhailo Ovramenko's neighbors, Stepan Tereshchenko and Roman Kasyan, a Cossack of the Kremenchuk regiment, began to live here. In 1752 the settlement accounted for some 256 men. During the establishment of the Russian colony of New Serbia in 1752–64, the 3rd Company of New Serbia was quartered in Usivka Pandurs. In place of Usivka, the sconce Bechey (after the Serbian city of Bečej) encampment was established.

In 1764, New Serbia was liquidated, and Usykivka became part of the Elizabethan province of Novorossiya Governorate, which existed until 1783, when its territory was included in the Yekaterinoslav Viceroyalty. In 1784, the Russian government gave the settlement a Hellenic name of Oleksandriisk and later Oleksandriia.

In 1793, 738 people lived here. In 1858, 7,800 people lived in Oleksandriia. At the beginning of the 20th century, 14,007 people lived in Oleksandriia. From 1806 to 1922, Oleksandriia was a county (uyezd) seat.

=== 20th century ===
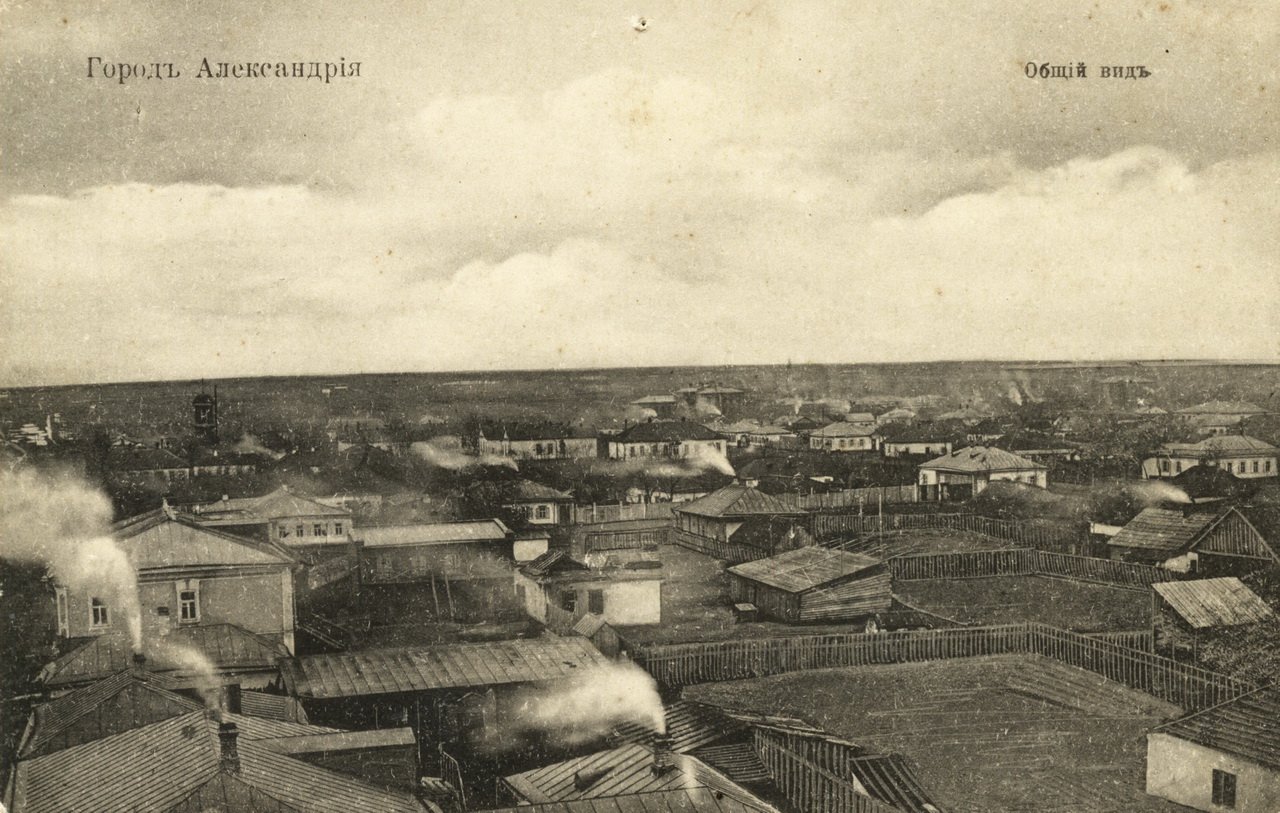
Early-20th-century view

During the Ukrainian War of Independence and Ukrainian–Soviet War in 1917, branches of the Ukrainian Free Cossacks appeared on the territory of Oleksandriia. Because of Red Terror in May 1919, the city of Oleksandria was the center of an anti-Bolshevik uprising led by Otaman Nykyfor Hryhoriv, whose forces were brutally suppressed by the Red Army on 23 May 1919. Afterwards it was administratively part of the Kremenchuk Governorate of Ukraine, and after its dissolution of the Katerynoslav Governorate of Ukraine.

During the Holodomor of 1932–1933, at least 1,729 residents of the city died

On 6 August 1941, (during World War II) the Red Army of the Soviet Union left the city to the Nazi Germany Wehrmacht without a fight. During the Nazi occupation, the city lost almost its entire Jewish population (est. ~2,500). The Nazi administration also executed over 5,500 Soviet prisoners of war as part of the Nazi stance on the issue of the Soviets not signing the 1929 Geneva Convention. The city was recovered by the Soviet armed forces on 6 December 1943.

=== Recent history ===
In 2013, 82,819 residents lived here.

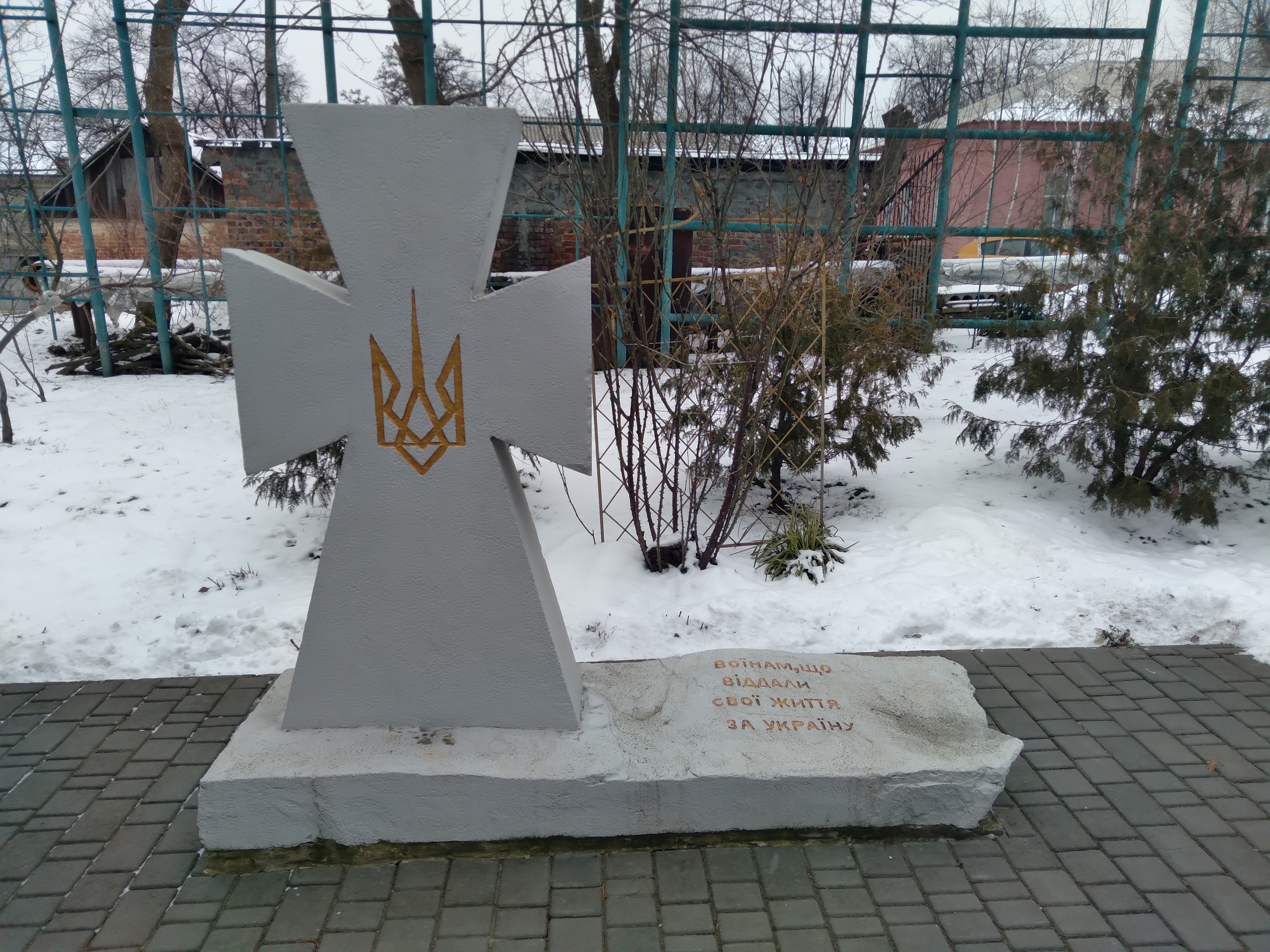
Monument to fallen heroes

During the war in the Donbas, 24 warriors from Oleksandriia died, in whose honor a monument in the form of a cross with a trident was opened on Independence Day 2017

Until 18 July 2020, Oleksandriia was designated as a city of oblast significance and belonged to Oleksandriia Municipality. It was the administrative center of Oleksandriia Raion even though it did not belong to the raion. As part of the administrative reform of Ukraine, which reduced the number of raions of Kirovohrad Oblast to four, Oleksandriia Municipality was merged into Oleksandriia Raion.

On 15 April 2022, at 10:26 p.m., two Russian missiles hit the infrastructure of the city's airport.

In 2023, on Independence Day, the Memorial Alley of those killed in the Russo-Ukrainian war opened.

== Population ==
Historical population

Year	Pop.	±%
1897	14,007	—
1926	18,255	+30.3%
1939	19,755	+8.2%
1959	35,190	+78.1%
1970	69,416	+97.3%

Year	Pop.	±%
1979	82,059	+18.2%
1989	102,611	+25.0%
2001	93,357	−9.0%
2011	83,339	−10.7%
2022	76,097	−8.7%

=== Language ===
Distribution of the population by native language according to the 2001 census:

Language	Percentage
Ukrainian	86.3%
Russian	13.19%
other/undecided	0.51%

== Geography ==
=== Climate ===
The climate of Oleksandriia is classified as humid continental (Köppen classification: Dfb). Winters are cold and mild, while summers are hot. January is usually the coldest month (average temperature -5 °C), its hottest month is July (average temperature 21.5 °C). With no dry season, winters are snowy and summers are rainy. Its wettest month is June (66 mm), its driest is March (30 mm), with an average annual precipitation of 526 mm.

Climate data for Oleksandriia, Ukraine (1949-2011)
Month	Jan	Feb	Mar	Apr	May	Jun	Jul	Aug	Sep	Oct	Nov	Dec	Year
Mean daily maximum °C (°F)	−1.8 (28.8)	−1 (30)	3.8 (38.8)	13.7 (56.7)	21.1 (70.0)	25.2 (77.4)	27.1 (80.8)	26.4 (79.5)	20.7 (69.3)	13.4 (56.1)	5.3 (41.5)	0.9 (33.6)	12.9 (55.2)
Daily mean °C (°F)	−5 (23)	−4.2 (24.4)	0.2 (32.4)	8.8 (47.8)	15.6 (60.1)	19.7 (67.5)	21.5 (70.7)	20.5 (68.9)	15 (59)	8.7 (47.7)	2.3 (36.1)	−1.8 (28.8)	8.4 (47.1)
Mean daily minimum °C (°F)	−8.1 (17.4)	−7.4 (18.7)	−3.3 (26.1)	4 (39)	10.2 (50.4)	14.2 (57.6)	15.9 (60.6)	14.7 (58.5)	9.4 (48.9)	4.1 (39.4)	−0.7 (30.7)	−4.4 (24.1)	4.1 (39.4)
Average precipitation mm (inches)	39 (1.5)	34 (1.3)	30 (1.2)	39 (1.5)	45 (1.8)	66 (2.6)	66 (2.6)	48 (1.9)	39 (1.5)	33 (1.3)	40 (1.6)	47 (1.9)	526 (20.7)
Source: Climate-data.org

== Places of interest ==
A popular place to visit in the town is Oleksandriia's square, known as Soborna Square ("Соборна площа").

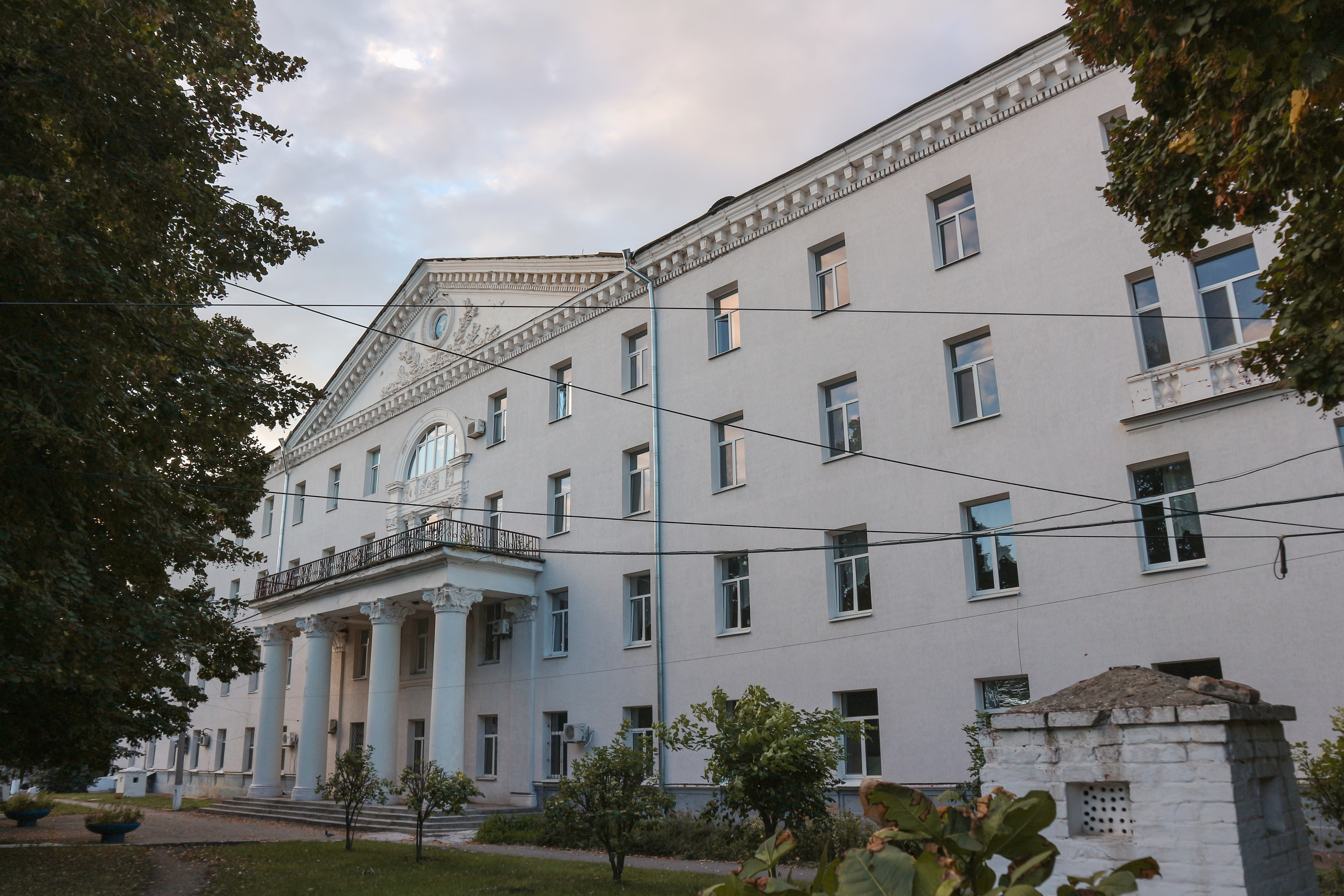
Hospital

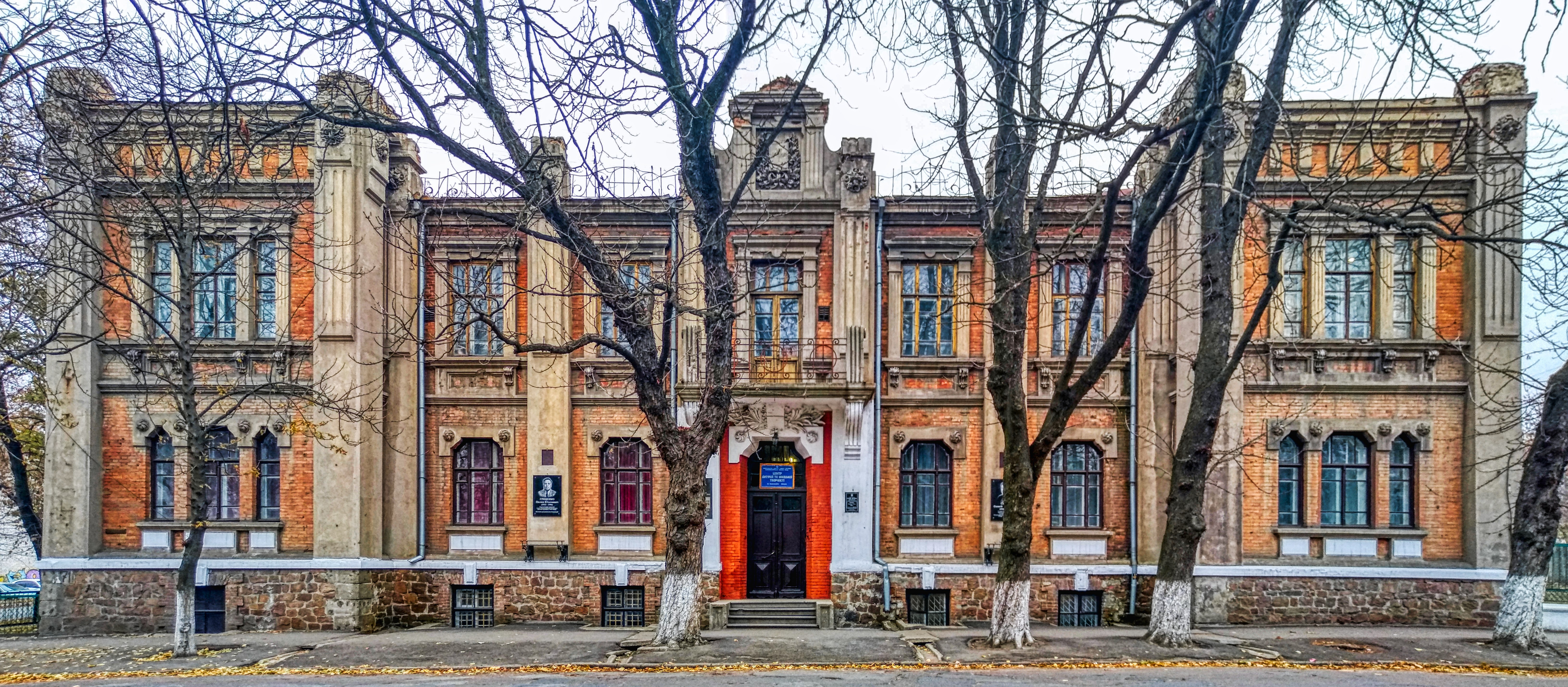
Zemstvo Administration

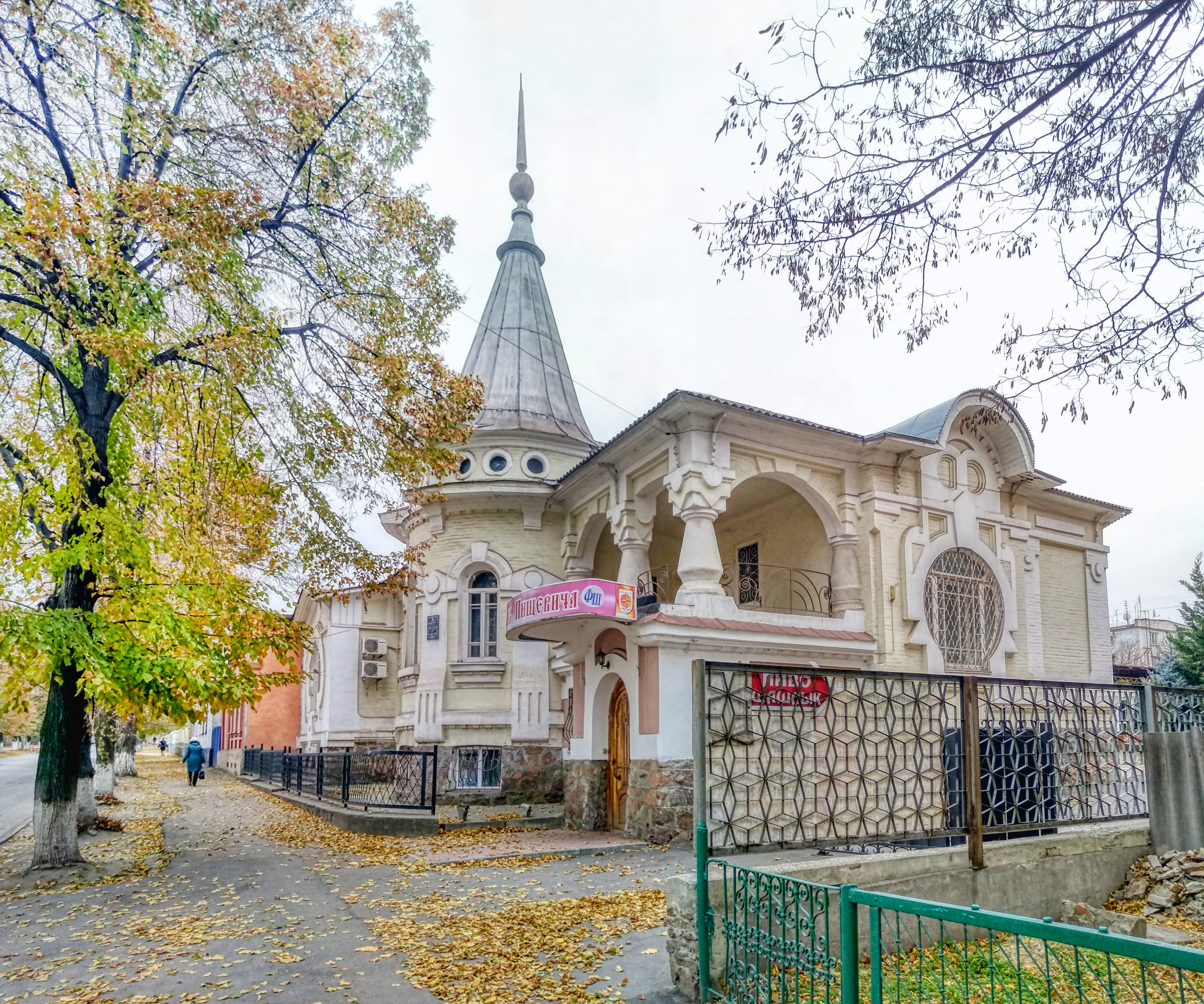
Pyshchevych's house

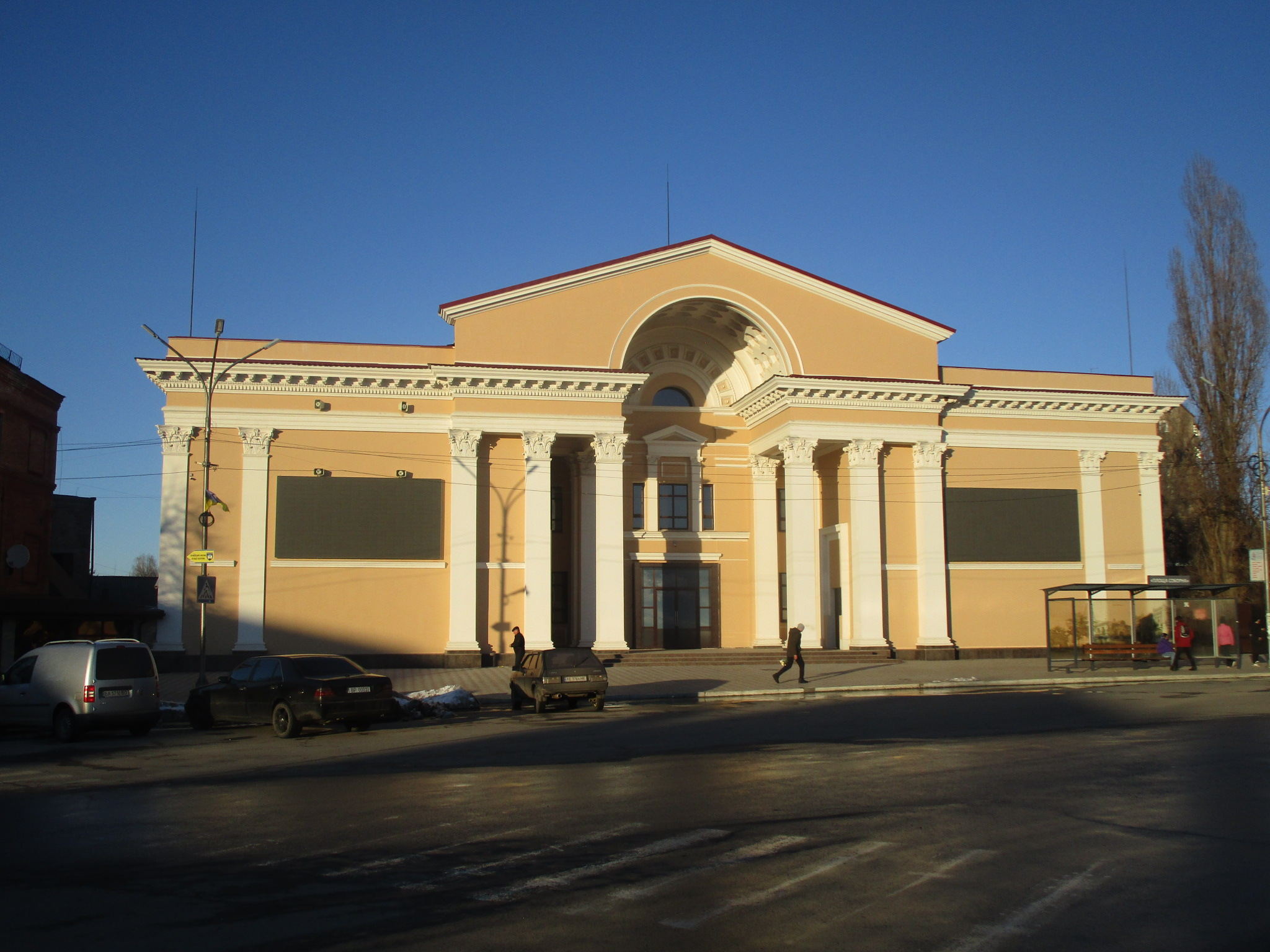
Cinema

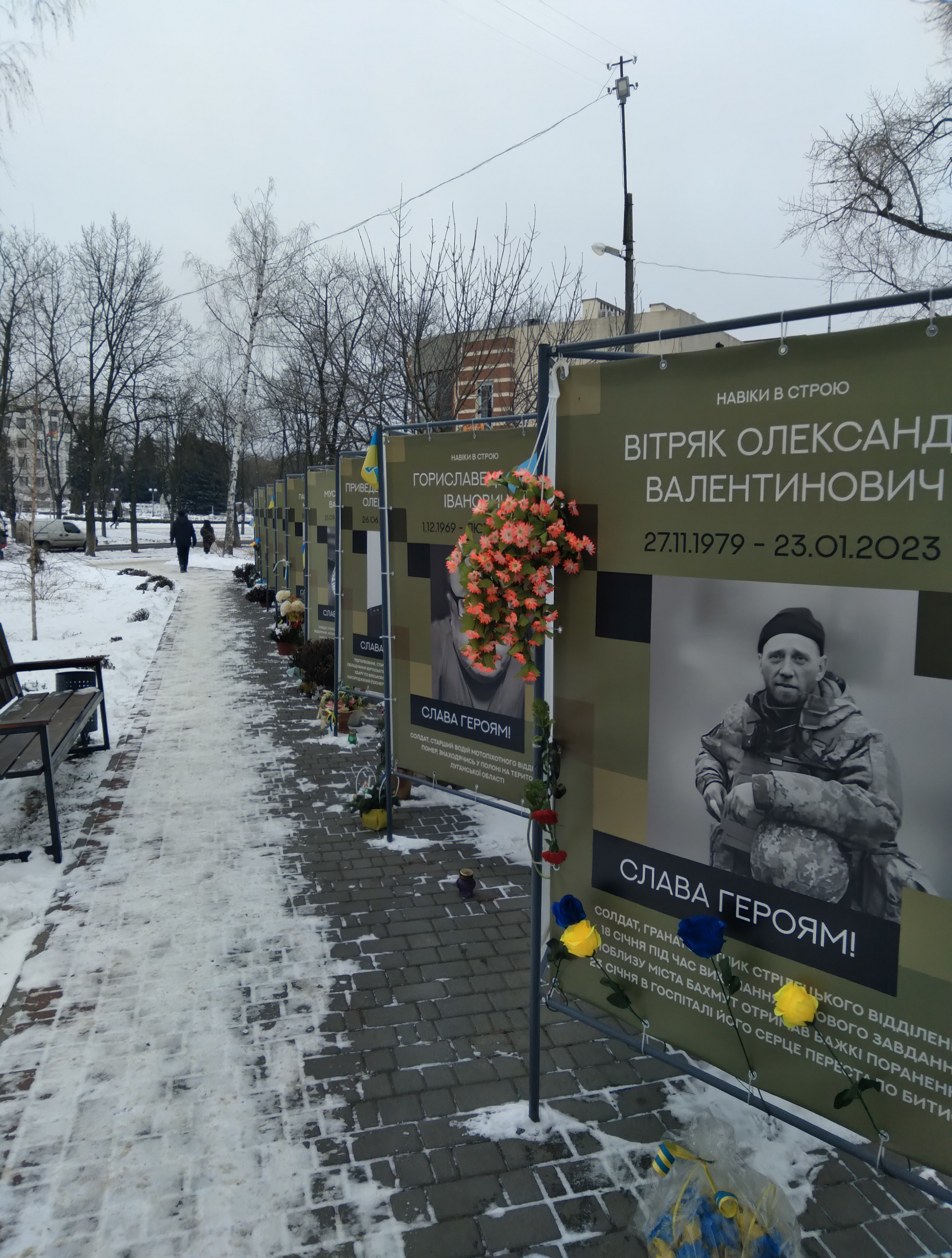
Alley of the memory

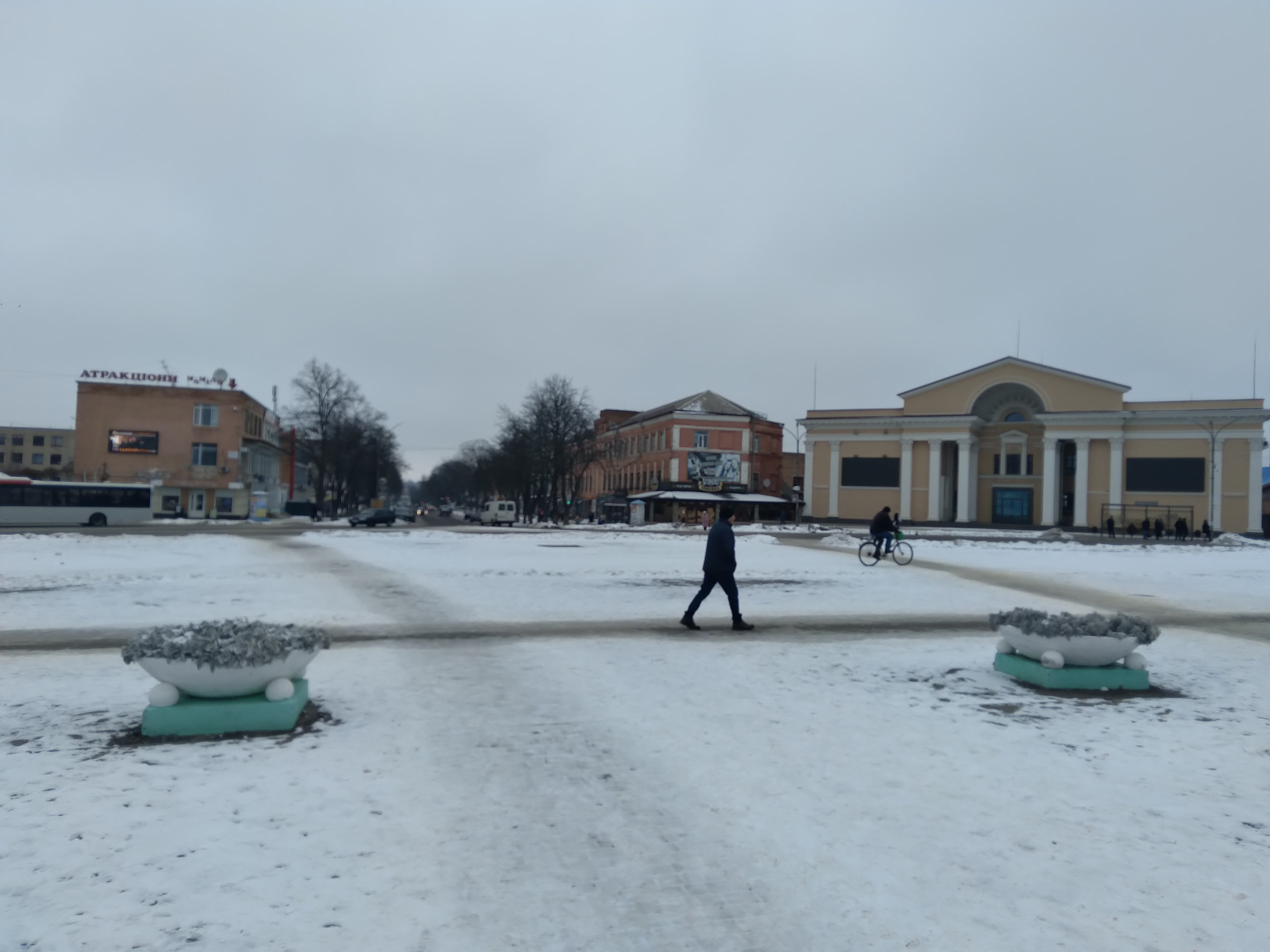
Main square

== International relations ==
=== Twin towns ===
Oleksandriia is twinned with:

- Jarocin, Poland
- Xinyi, China
- Tervel, Bulgaria

=== Friendship agreement ===
- Bath, United Kingdom

== Notable people ==
- Dmytro Chyzhevsky, Ukrainian Slavist (1894-1977)
- Pyotr Koshevoy, Soviet military leader (1904-1976)
- Yuriy Kravchenko, Ukrainian police officer and statesman (1951-2005)
- Artem Polyarus, footballer
- Leonid Popov, Soviet cosmonaut, Recipient of the Order of Lenin and Hero of the Republic of Cuba
- Sholom Secunda, Jewish-American composer (1894-1974)
- Bohdan Kolmakov, the first parkour world champion

== See also ==
- List of cities in Ukraine
