= Valerian Domger =

Valerian Alexandrovich Domger
- Валериан Александрович Домгер
- Born: 1851; Russian Empire
- Died: 22 January [O.S. 10 January] 1885; Saint Petersburg, Russian Empire
- Education: Saint Petersburg Mining Institute (1873)
- Scientific career
- Fields: Geology, mining engineering
- Workplaces: Geological Committee

Valerian Alexandrovich Domger (Russian: Валериан Александрович Домгер; 1851 – 22 January [O.S. 10 January] 1885) was a geologist and mining engineer of the Russian Empire in the 19th century.

== Early life and education ==
Born in 1851 in the Russian Empire.

In 1868, he graduated from the Chișinău Governorate Gymnasium, where he studied together with psychiatrist M. E. Lion.

In 1873, he graduated from the Mining Institute.

== Career ==
He was then seconded for one year to the disposal of the manager of the mining and salt departments of the Don Host Oblast for practical training. He visited mines and metallurgical plants of the Donetsk okrug and the Yekaterinoslav Governorate, compiled a detailed description – in geological, technical and economic respects – of the Grushevskoye deposit and the mine of the Russian Society of Shipping and Trade.

In 1874 he returned to Saint Petersburg; from November he was enrolled in the Main Mining Administration and sent to Odessa, to the plant of the Russian Society of Shipping and Trade, to study briquetting.

In 1875, on the instructions of the Mining Department, he investigated the territory between the Dnieper and Inhul rivers in the Yekaterinoslav Governorate with the aim of finding outcrops of iron ore and other minerals.

In the summer of 1876, in the Oryol and Kursk Governorates, he investigated and described deposits of the Devonian and Cretaceous systems and assembled a palaeontological collection of the region.

In 1876 he accompanied Nikolai Barbot de Marny on his trip along the line of the under-construction Orenburg Railway, taking part in geological investigations of the adjacent area.

In 1877, on the instructions of the Mining Department, he conducted geological surveys along the line of the Ural Mining Railway, compiled a detailed geological map of the studied area, drew a profile of the railway line, and collected a rich body of material on the palaeontology of this region.

In 1878 he carried out geological work along the line of the under-construction Donetsk Railway in Bakhmut and Slavyanoserbsk uyezds of the Yekaterinoslav Governorate and a small part of the Don Host Oblast.

From April 1882 he was a junior geologist of the Geological Committee (Geolcom). He participated in compiling the general geological map of the Russian Empire. In the summers of 1883 and 1884 he conducted geological investigations within sheet 47 of the map, an area of about 13,000 square versts in Verkhnedneprovsk and Yekaterinoslav uyezds of the Yekaterinoslav Governorate, in Kherson and Aleksandriya uyezds of the Kherson Governorate, as well as along the line of the under-construction Catherine Railway. In the summer of 1883 he discovered manganese ore near the Solona River.

=== Scientific activity ===
In the Yekaterinoslav Governorate he discovered rich deposits of millstone sandstone, kaolin and graphite; he investigated and described outcrops of crystalline rocks of this area.

In the Eocene deposits of the Tertiary system he found traces of a rich and diverse fauna.

He discovered remains of nummulites, previously known only in the Crimea.

In Palaeogene remains of the Tertiary system he found an oyster bank composed of valves of a previously unknown species Ostrea callifera and a layer filled with ostracods; in Pliocene deposits – remains of extinct vertebrates Rhinoceros and Mastodon.

=== Membership in organisations ===
- In 1876 (or 1877) he was elected a full member of the St. Petersburg Society of Naturalists.
- In 1878 he was elected a full member of the Imperial Mineralogical Society.

== Death ==
He died on 22 January [O.S. 10 January] 1885 in Saint Petersburg.

== Selected works ==
=== Books ===
- Домгер, В. А. (1902). Геологические исследования в Южной России в 1881—1884 годах [Geological investigations in Southern Russia in 1881–1884]. Тр. / Геологический комитет. — Т. 20, № 1 (in Russian). St. Petersburg: тип. М. Стасюлевича. p. 187.
- Домгер, В. А. (1881). Геологические наблюдения, произведенные в западной части Уральской горнозаводской жел. дор. между г. Пермью и ст. Биссер [Geological observations carried out in the western part of the Ural Mining Railway between Perm and Bisser station]. Отт. из «Зап. Имп. Минерал. о-ва». — 1882. — Т. 17. — С. 108–173 (in Russian). St. Petersburg: тип. Имп. Акад. наук. p. 66.
- Домгер, В. А. (1881). Краткий очерк истории геологии Донецкого каменноугольного бассейна [A brief outline of the history of the geology of the Donets coal basin]. Прил. к журн. «Юж.-рус. горн. листок» (in Russian). Kharkov: тип. К. П. Счасни. p. 142.
- Домгер, В. А. (1880). Новое месторождение киновари в России [A new cinnabar deposit in Russia]. Извлеч. из № 12 «Горн. журн.» — 1880 (in Russian). [St. Petersburg]: тип. и хромолит А. Траншеля. p. 9.
- Домгер, В. А. (1881). О кристаллических породах Юга и Юго-запада Европейской России [On the crystalline rocks of the South and South‑west of European Russia]. Извлеч. из № 3 «Горн. журн.» — 1881 (in Russian). [St. Petersburg]: тип. и хромолит. А. Траншеля. p. 31.
- Домгер, В. А. (1883). Предварительный отчет о геологическом исследовании, произведенном летом 1882 года [Preliminary report on the geological investigation carried out in the summer of 1882]. Отт. из «Изв. Геол. ком.» — 1883. — Т. 2 (in Russian). [St. Petersburg]: тип. Имп. Акад. наук. p. 18.
- Домгер, В. А. (1884). Предварительный отчет о геологическом исследовании, произведенном летом 1883 года [Preliminary report on the geological investigation carried out in the summer of 1883]. Отт. из «Изв. Геол. ком.» — 1884. — Т. 4 (in Russian). [St. Petersburg]: тип. Имп. Акад. наук. p. 32.
- Домгер, В. А. (1877). Современное состояние вопроса о «стилолитах» и их происхождении [The current state of the question of “stylolites” and their origin]. Отт. из «Тр. С.-Петерб. о-ва естествоиспытателей». — 1877. — Т. 8. — С. 139–167 (in Russian). St. Petersburg: тип. В. Демакова. p. 29.
- Штёр, Э. (1878). Katechismus der Bergbaukunde Основные начала горного искусства в форме вопросов и ответов [Fundamental principles of mining art in the form of questions and answers] (in Russian). Translated from the German by V. Domger and G. Lebedev. St. Petersburg. p. 285.
  - (2nd ed.). St. Petersburg. 1896. p. 285

=== Journal articles ===
- Домгер, В. А. (1878). "Геологические наблюдения, произведенные летом 1876 г. в Ливенском уезде Орловской губ. и Щигровском уезде Курской губ" [Geological observations carried out in the summer of 1876 in Livensky Uyezd of Oryol Governorate and Shchigrovsky Uyezd of Kursk Governorate]. Горный Журн. (in Russian). 2: 71–86.
- Домгер, В. А. (1876). "Геологическое исследование западной части кристаллической полосы в Новороссии в 1875 г" [Geological investigation of the western part of the crystalline belt in New Russia in 1875]. Горный Журн. (in Russian). 2: 280–299.
- Домгер, В. А. (1881). "Новый способ цементирования каменноугольной мелочи" [A new method of cementing coal slack]. Южн. Русск. Горн. Лист. (in Russian). 2: 196–199.
- Домгер, В. А. (1876). "Приготовление брикетов из каменноугольной мелочи" [Preparation of briquettes from coal slack]. Горный Журн (in Russian). 2: 123–173.
- Домгер, В. А. (1879). "Результаты исследований вдоль линии железных дорог, строившихся в России в период времени с 1845 г" [Results of investigations along the lines of railways under construction in Russia in the period from 1845]. Горный Журн (in Russian). 1: 147–172.
- Домгер, В. А. (1874). "Современное состояние некоторых каменноугольных рудников юга России" [The current state of some coal mines of southern Russia]. Горный Журн (in Russian). 4: 159–178.
