= Donets Governorate =

Governorate of Ukrainian SSR

Donets Governorate Донецька губернія
- Governorate of Ukrainian SSR
- 1919–1925
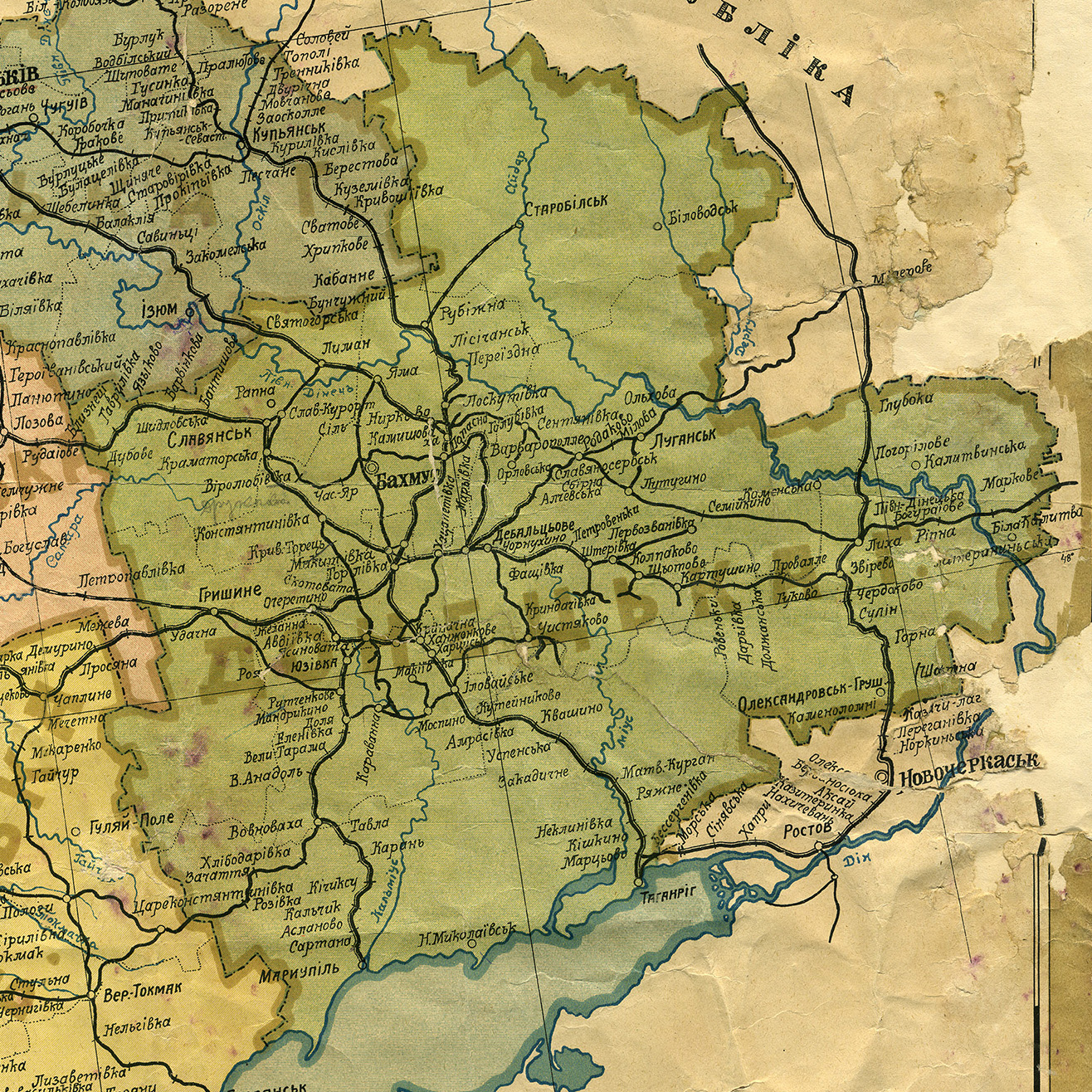
- Map of 1922
- Capital: Luhansk (1920); Bakhmut (1920-25)
- History
  - Second Soviet invasion of Ukraine: 1919
  - abolished (Okruhas of Ukraine): 1 October 1925
Preceded by
Yekaterinoslav Governorate
Kharkiv Governorate
Don Republic
Succeeded by
Artemivsk Okruha
Luhansk Okruha
Mariyupil Okruha
Starobilsk Okruha
Yuzivka Okruha
South-East, Russian SFSR
- Today part of: Ukraine; Russia

Donets Governorate (Ukrainian: Донецька губернія, romanized: Donetska huberniia) was a governorate of the Ukrainian SSR (Ukraine) that existed between 1919 and 1925.

== History ==
The governorate was originally created on 5 February 1919 on orders of People's Commissar of Internal Affairs Kliment Voroshylov and the same day confirmed by the Council of People's Commissars of Ukraine. It was created from eastern territories of Yekaterinoslav Governorate (including counties of Bakhmut and Slovianoserbsk), southern territories of Kharkov Governorate (including Sloviansk) and western territories of Don Host Land.

Due to invasion of Anton Denikin troops the guberniya was dissolved in summer of 1919 and its territory was part of the South Russia, the Russian White South.

With the defeat of the Denikin's armies, the governorate was under special jurisdiction of Donets Gubernatorial Executive Committee, while revival of local economy was conducted by the Ukrainian Industrial Bureau.

On 15 March 1920 new administrative border contours were confirmed by the head of Ukrainian Soviet Labour Army, Iosif Stalin. On 23 March 1920 recreation of the region was confirmed by the Sovnarkom (Council of People's Commissars of the Russian SFSR). In April 1920 the Donets Governorate was reestablished from the eastern portions of Yekaterinoslav and Kharkov Governorates as well as territories of the liquidated Don Republic. After defeat of Denikin, in the region were formed Bolshevik "ChON" detachments (special purpose detachments) of local Communist and Komsomol activists who fought against their former allied Makhno formations (so called "local banditry"). The struggle against so called "Makhnovshchina" continued until 1922.

In the fall of 1920, White guards armies of Pyotr Wrangel were conducting some military operations against the Workers and Peasants Red Army (RKKA). During this period the gubernatorial seat was relocated from Luhansk to Bakhmut (which in 1924 was renamed Artemivsk). Following the retreat of White Guards from the region, Donets Governorate was visited by Leon Trotsky who on 19 November 1920 wrote to Lenin,

Situation in Donbas is extremely difficult. Workers are starving, there is a lack of clothes. Despite the revolutionary Soviet mood, strikes erupt here and there. You have to be surprised that workers are working at all.

To fight famine in the region, a big help was received from such international organizations like the American Relief Administration, the Fridtjof Nansen's mission of the International Red Cross, and the Workers International Relief.

Despite protests from the local gubernatorial administration, in February 1924 a big portion of the region's south including such cities like Taganrog and Shakhty was passed on to the newly created South-Eastern Oblast of the Russian SFSR. In return, the Ukrainian SSR insignificant territorial gains in area of Sloboda Ukraine near Grayvoron, Putyvl, and Belgorod.

On 14 February 1925, it was abolished.

== Governors ==
- 1919 Comrade Artyom (Fyodor Sergeyev)
- 1920 Vladimir Antonov-Saratovskiy (Donets Gubernatorial Executive Committee)

== Subdivisions ==
Created in 1919 as a temporary governorate, originally consisted of two uezds of Yekaterinoslav Governorate

- Bakhmut County
- Slovianoserbsk County

Since March 7, 1923 the following okruhas of the Donets Governorate existed:

- Bakhmut
- Luhansk
- Mariupol
- Starobilsk
- Taganrog
- Yuzivka (Donetsk)
- Shakhty (Olexandrovsk-Grushevskyi)

== Gallery ==
Administrative division of Ukraine in 1924-25
