= Apollonivka paleovolcano =

Ancient extinct volcano in Ukraine

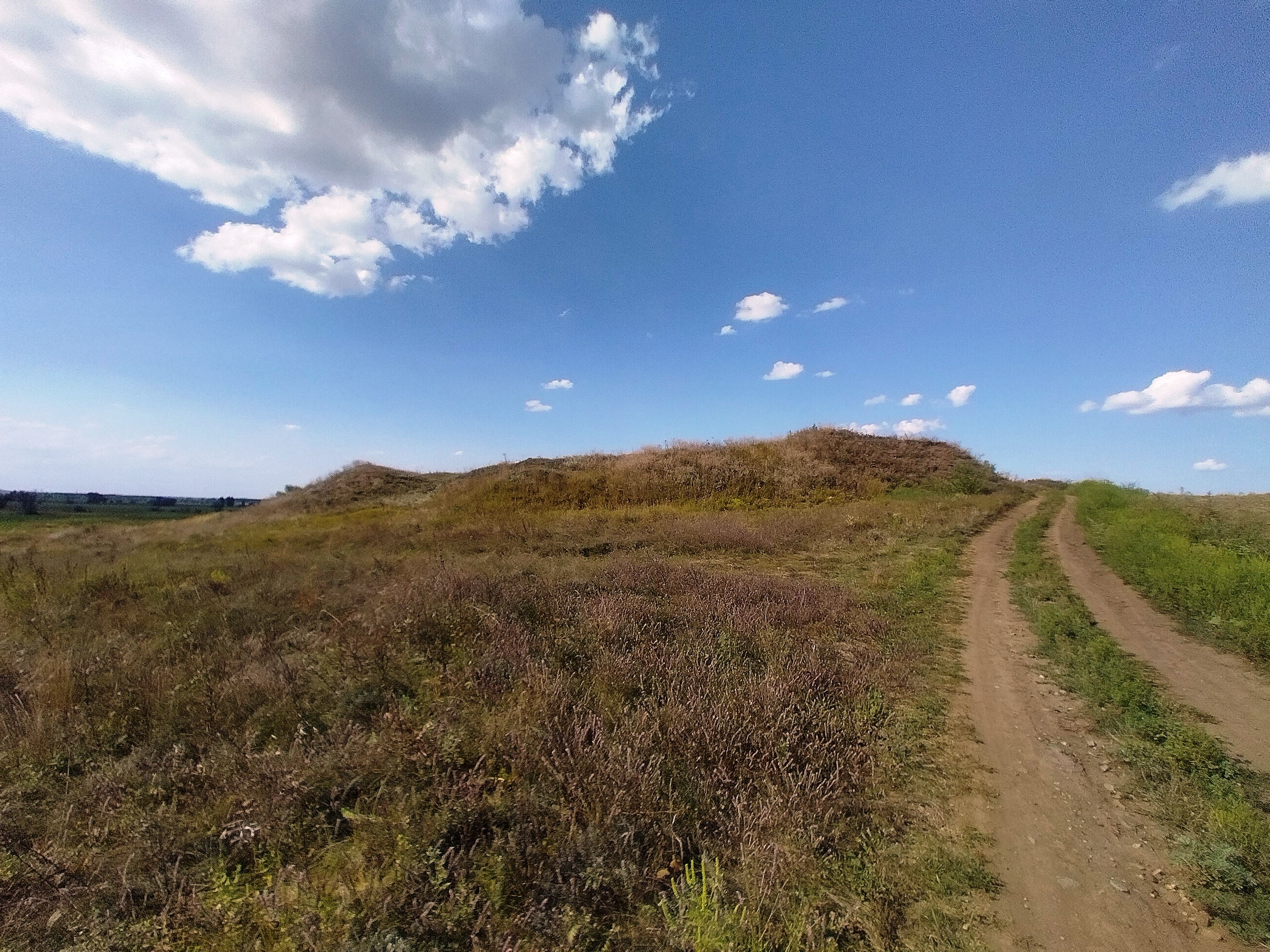
- View from the road of the quarry containing the vent of the Apollonivskyi paleovolcano

Highest point
- Coordinates: 48.2437509°N 34.7933661°E

Geography
- Location within Ukraine
- Location: Apollonivka, Dnipro Raion
- Country: Ukraine

Geology
- Rock age: > 3 billion years
- Mountain type: Extinct paleovolcano
- Last eruption: ~ 3 billion years ago

Apollonivka paleovolcano — an ancient extinct volcano, located a few hundred meters from the right bank of the Mokra Sura River, north of the village of Apollonivka on the right bank of the Dnipro in Dnipro Raion of Dnipropetrovsk Oblast, 40 km (25 mi) southwest of the centre of Dnipro. The Apollonivka paleovolcano is one of the oldest paleovolcanoes on Earth (3.2 billion years). The age of the oldest lava flows discovered on Earth, near the settlement of Inukjuak on the shore of Hudson Bay in Canada, is 3.825 billion years.

== Research ==
The first researcher of the volcano was Valerian Domger, who left a description of it in the work "Geological investigations in Southern Russia in 1881–1884". More complete data were published in the article "On the Apollonovo paleovolcano" in 1987.

Modern investigations are carried out by Candidate of Geological and Mineralogical Sciences, Associate Professor of the Department of Geology and Hydrogeology of DNU, Volodymyr Manyuk. The volcano is a constant centre of geological research by scientists and students.

== Description ==
The last eruption is estimated to have occurred about 3.2 billion years ago. The volcano is composed of metagabbro, metatuffs and metabasalts. Because the Apollonivka volcano is older than the Crimean paleovolcanoes Fiolent and Kara-Dag, its original structure is not as well preserved. Nevertheless, fragments of the paleovolcanic "amphitheatre" that generated lava in that distant time can be distinguished here. An experienced geologist’s eye can make out the volcanic vent, and at the bottom one can notice the collision of two lava flows.

== Gallery ==
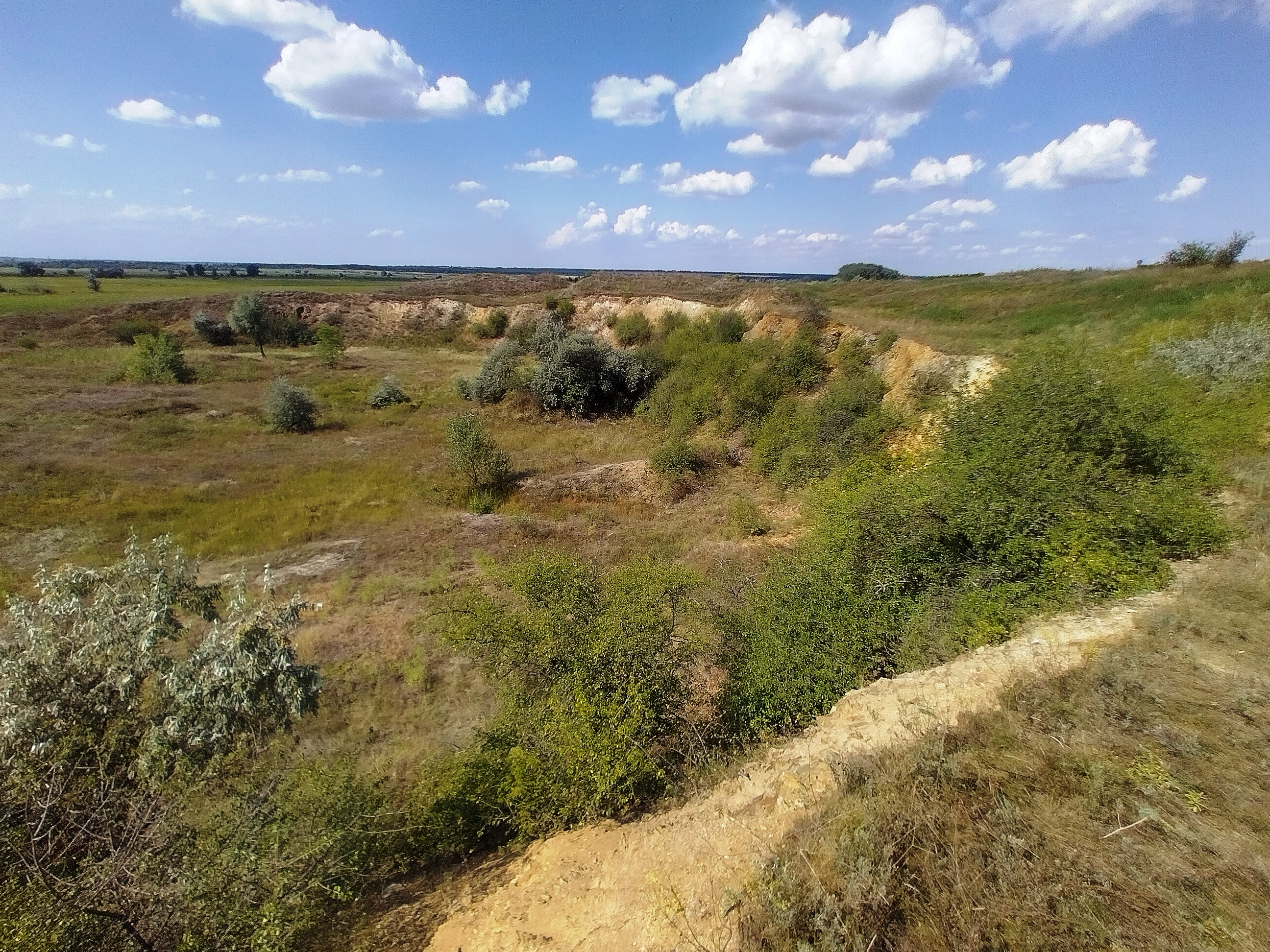
General view

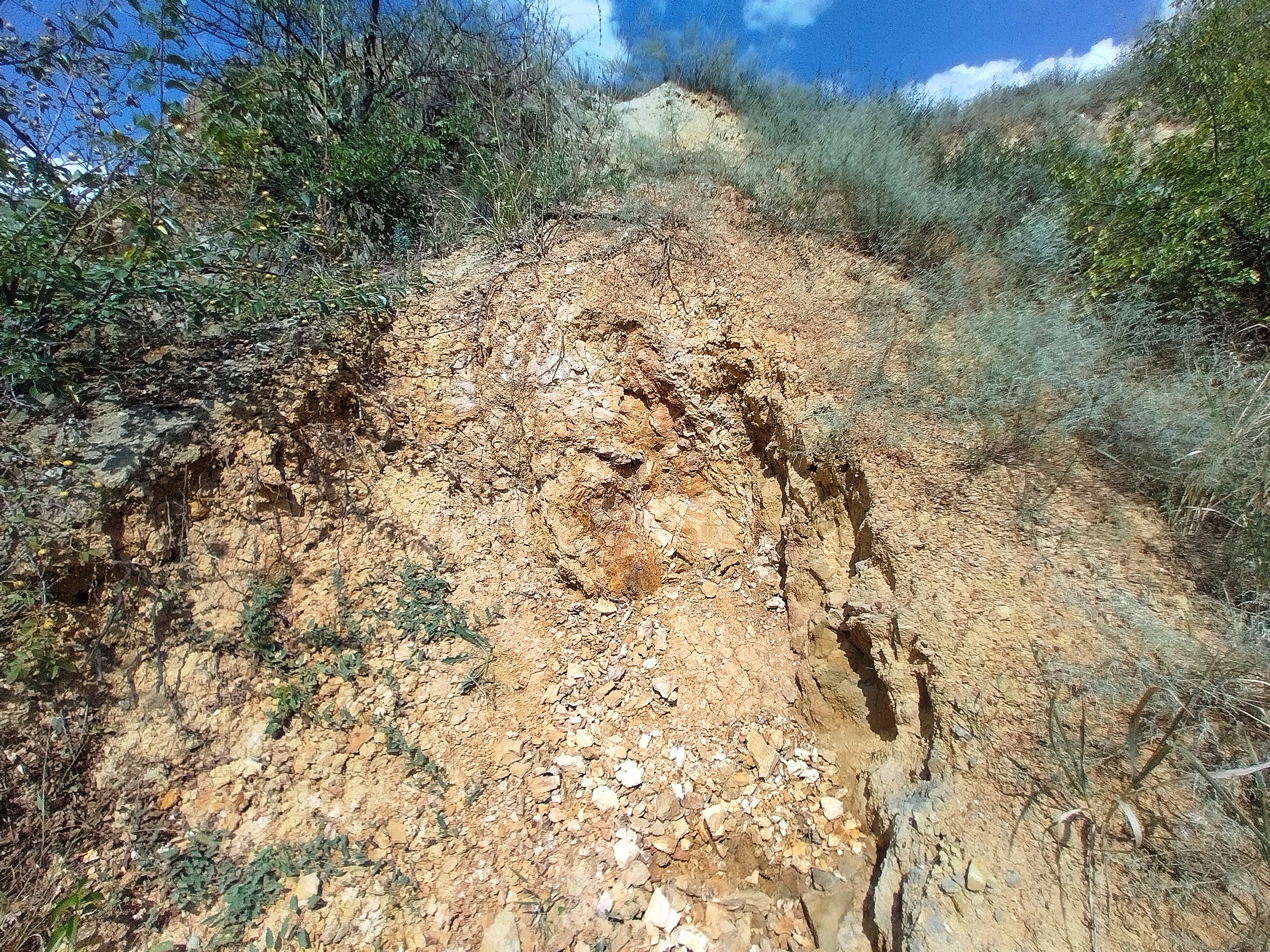
Solidified lava flow

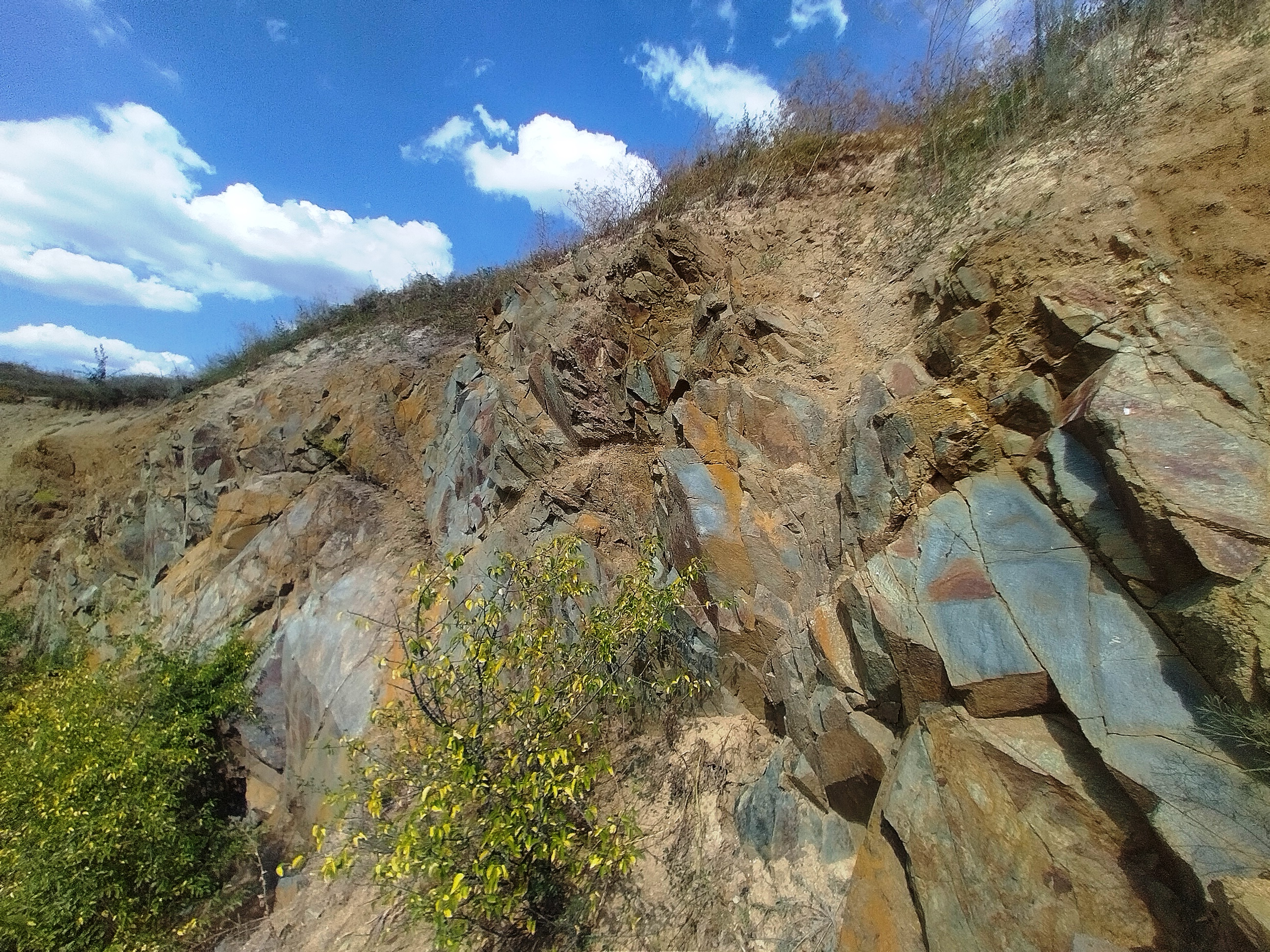
Cliffs of metabasalt

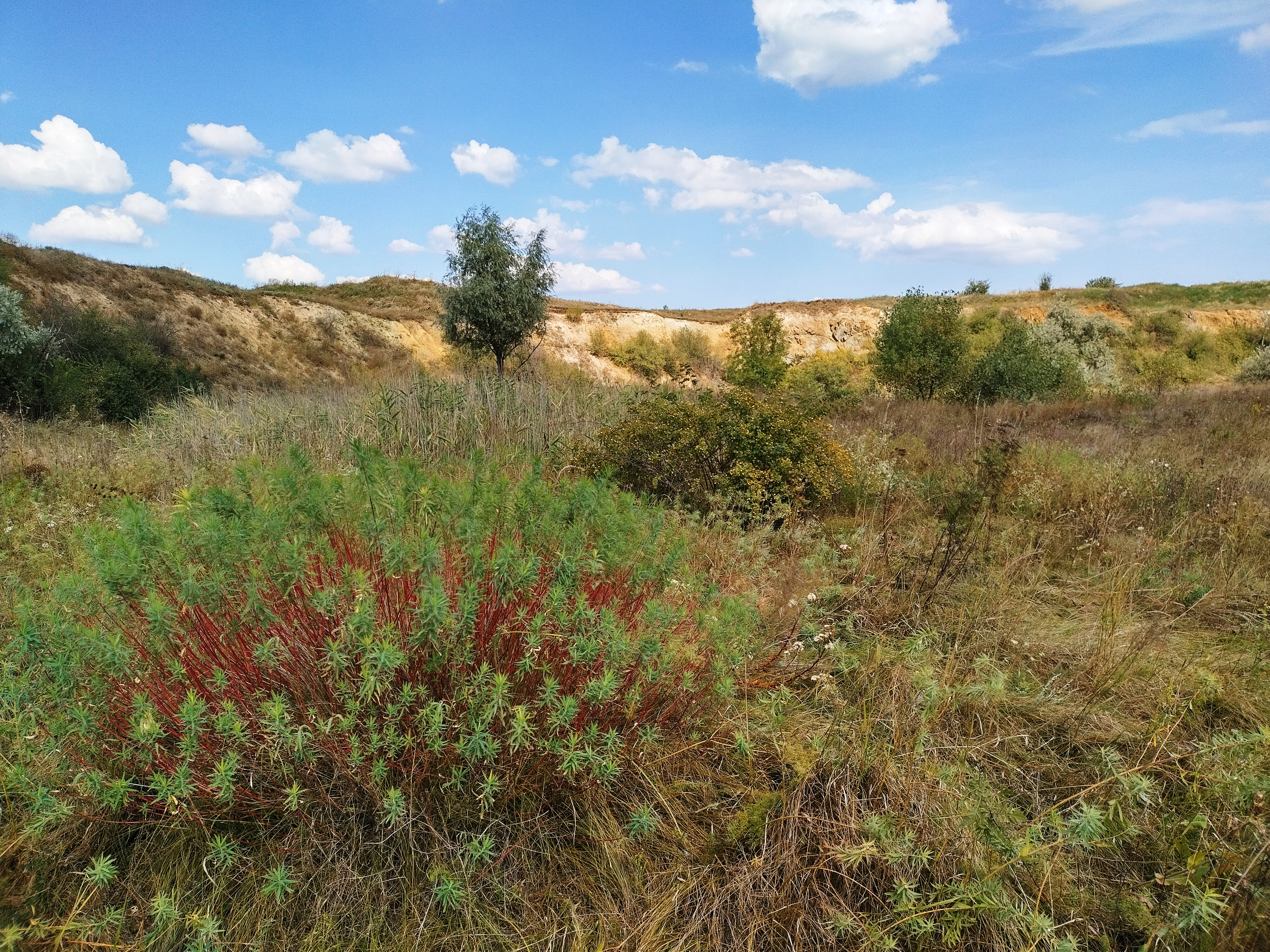
Vegetation inside the volcanic vent

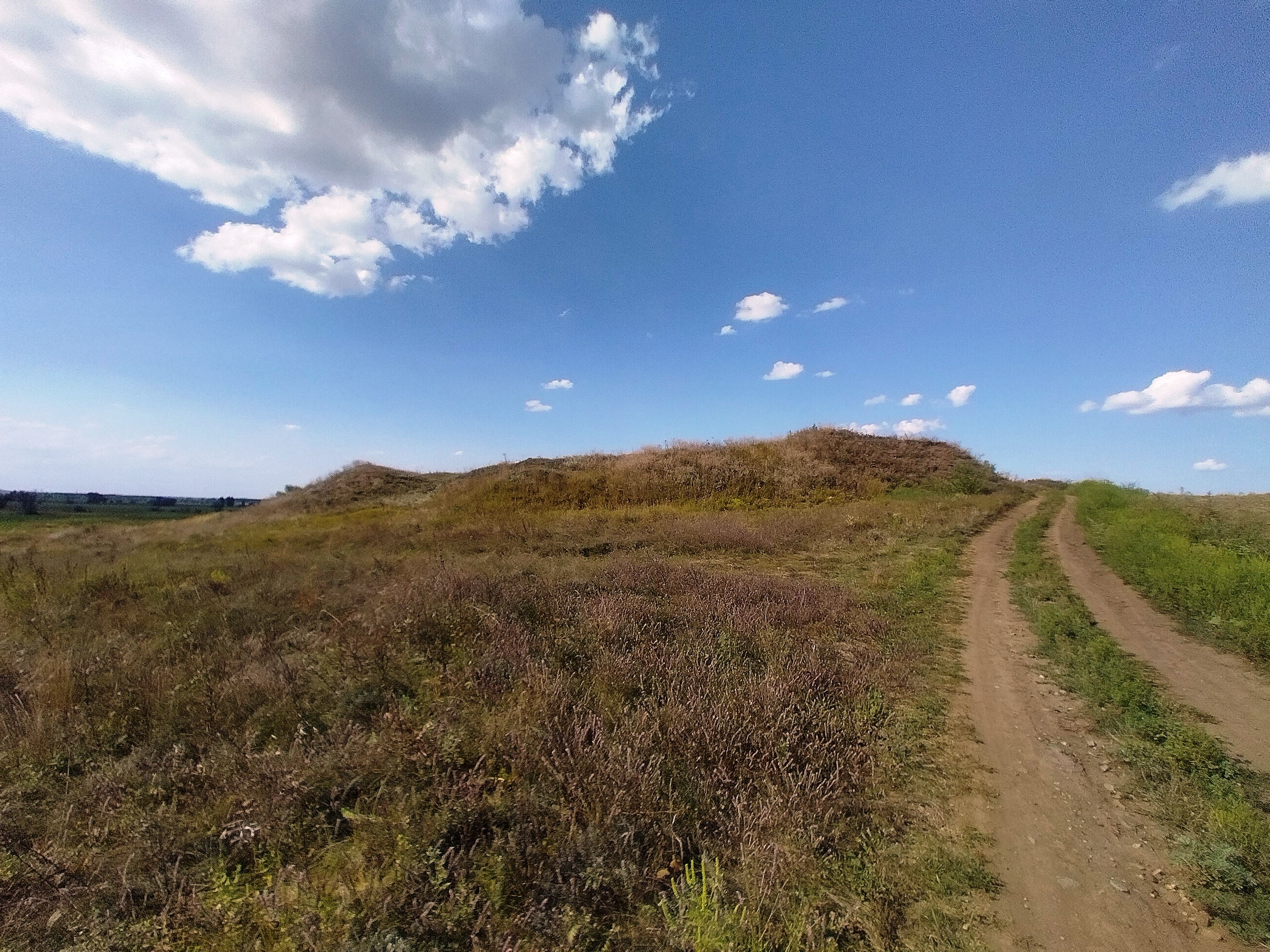
View from the road of the quarry containing the vent
