= Pavel Taran =

Soviet Ilyushin Il-4 pilot (1916–2005)

Pavel Andreyevich Taran
- Russian: Павел Андреевич Таран; Ukrainian: Павло Андрійович Таран
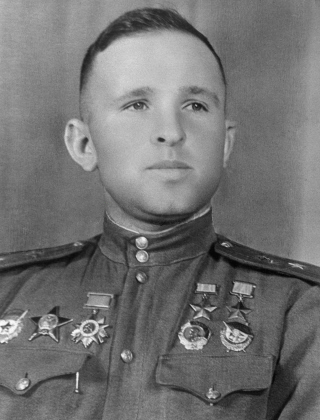
- Born: 18 October [O.S. 5 October] 1916; Sholokhovo, Yekaterinoslavsky Uyezd, Yekaterinoslav Governorate, Russian Empire (located within present-day Nikopol Raion, Ukraine)
- Died: 14 September 2005 (aged 88); Moscow, Russian Federation
- Military career
- Allegiance: Soviet Union
- Branch: Soviet Air Force
- Service years: 1937–1979
- Rank: General-lieutenant of Aviation
- Conflicts: World War II; Invasion of Poland; Winter War; Eastern Front
- Awards: Hero of the Soviet Union (twice)

Pavel Andreyevich Taran (Russian: Павел Андреевич Таран, Ukrainian: Павло Андрійович Таран; 18 October [O.S. 5 October] 1916 – 14 September 2005) was an Il-4 pilot who was twice awarded the title Hero of the Soviet Union during World War II. He later went on to become a General-lieutenant.

== Early life ==
Taran was born on 18 October [O.S. 5 October] 1916 to a Ukrainian peasant family in the village of Sholokhovo in the Yekaterinoslavsky Uyezd of the Yekaterinoslav Governorate of the Russian Empire (present-day Ukraine). After completing seven grades of school he attended a trade school in Zaporizhia, which he graduated from in 1933. He attended another vocational school in 1934, after which he was employed at a Metallurgical plant as an electrician until 1937. That year he graduated from training at the Nikopol aeroclub and joined the military in November. Barely a year later in December 1938 he graduated from the Kacha Military Aviation School of Pilots and was then assigned to the 50th Bomber Aviation Regiment. In Spring 1939 he was transferred to the 35th High-Speed Bomber Regiment, in which he first saw combat during the Soviet invasion of Poland. In November he was deployed to the warfront of the Winter War, where he piloted the Tupolev SB. After returning from the war in April he was assigned to the 81st Long-Range Bomber Regiment as a flight commander.

== World War II ==
From the first month of Operation Barbarossa, Taran participated in the defense of the Soviet Union. He soon suffered a close call with death when his Il-4 was shot down by German fighters; he was able to parachute out of the plane shortly before it crashed. All other crew members on board were killed in the crash. Having parachuted out at a low altitude, he landed close to his fallen bomber and buried the remains of his deceased comrades. After returning to his unit three days later he returned to flying and was reassigned to a new flight crew. He remained with that crew until September 1942, during which he flew 150 missions and gained multiple shootdowns of enemy fighters with them. He was again shot down on 24 October 1941. For flying 33 daylight and 26 night missions he was nominated for the title Hero of the Soviet Union on 11 September 1941 and awarded it on 20 June 1942. In August 1942 his unit was honored with the guards designation and renamed the 5th Guards Long-range Aviation Regiment. During the ceremony of receiving the guards flag, Taran was the standard-bearer. That year he received a minor head injury during a mission to bomb an enemy airfield. In September he began flying with a new aircrew, and by 30 November 1943 he was nominated for the title Hero of the Soviet Union again for flying 350 sorties, during which two enemy crossings, fifteen supply warehouses, and eight aircraft on the ground were destroyed in addition to starting 39 fires. He was awarded the title again on 13 March 1944 before leaving the 81st Regiment in July.

In July 1944 he became a flight inspector for the 6th Long-range Aviation Corps. In that role he approved nine pilots for night flights and reviewed 76 more pilots. In April he was made commander of the 240th Bomber Aviation Regiment, which carried out 190 sorties during spring 1945 and was tasked with bombing tank columns, ammunition storage facilities, bridges, airfields, and trains as well as photographing bombed areas. Throughout the war he flew 356 sorties, of which 316 were at night. He flew in the battles over Ukraine, the Caucasus, Kuban, Kursk, Leningrad, Belarus, Lviv, the Baltics, Konigsberg and Berlin.

== Postwar ==
Taran remained in command of the 240th Regiment until April 1946, after which he became a squadron commander in the 199th Guards Bomber Regiment. From March 1948 to May 1951 he served as a flight inspector in the 4th Guards Aviation Corps, which used the B-25 and Tu-4. He then was appointed as commander of the 251st Guards Heavy Bomber Aviation Regiment, which he remained in until being made deputy commander of the 15th Guards Heavy Bomber Division in December 1954; in July 1955 he was promoted to commander of the division, and in 1957 he was promoted to the rank of general-major. After graduating from the Military Academy of the General Staff he became the commander of the 79th Heavy Bomber Division in December 1958; the division used the Tu-95. He then held a variety of flight training and staff posts before retiring in 1979 as a general-lieutenant. From then until 1984 he worked as a designer for the Tupolev Bureau. He died in Moscow on 14 September 2005 and was buried in the Troekurovsky cemetery.

== Awards and honors ==
Soviet

- Twice Hero of the Soviet Union (20 June 1942 and 13 March 1944)
- Order of Lenin (20 June 1942)
- Order of the October Revolution (21 February 1978)
- Two Order of the Red Banner (5 November 1941 and 22 February 1955)
- Order of Alexander Nevsky (13 July 1945)
- Two Order of the Patriotic War 1st class (28 April 1943 and 11 March 1985)
- Two Order of the Red Star (22 February 1941 and 3 November 1953)
- Order of the Red Banner of Labor (30 May 1973)
- campaign and jubilee medals

International

- East Germany – Patriotic Order of Merit 3rd class
- Mongolia – Order of the Polar Star (6 July 1971)

== See also ==
- Alexander Molodchy
- Vasily Osipov
- Yevgeny Fyodorov
