= Pavlograd uezd =

Pavlograd uezd Павлоградскій уѣздъ
- Uezd
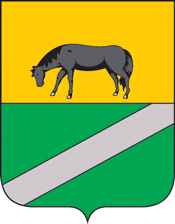
- Coat of arms

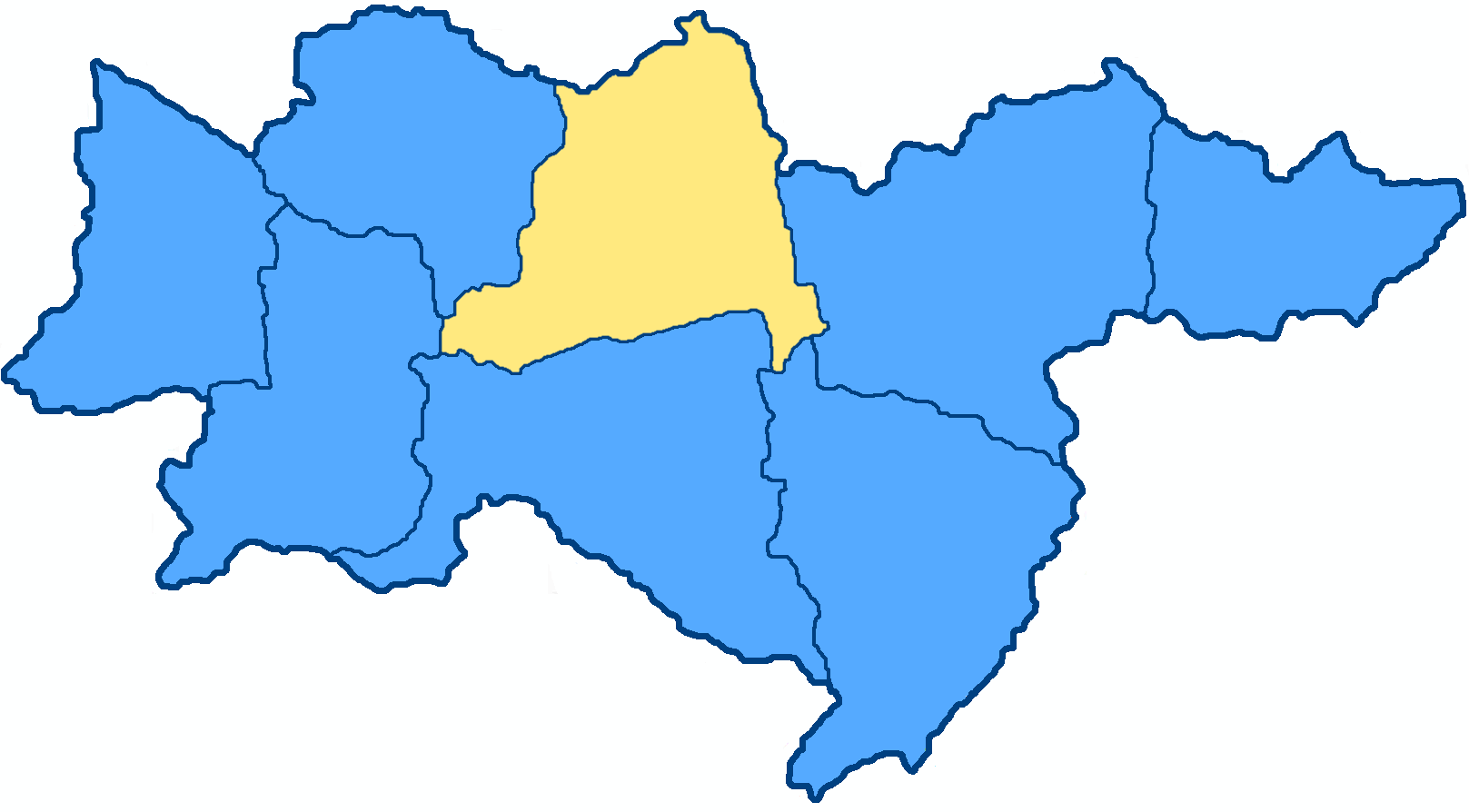
- Location in the Yekaterinoslav Governorate
- Country: Russian Empire
- Governorate: Yekaterinoslav
- Established: 1784
- Abolished: 7 March 1923
- Capital: Pavlograd

Area
  - Total: 10,032.81 km^{2} (3,873.69 sq mi)

Population (1897)
  - Total: 251,460
  - Density: 25.064/km^{2} (64.915/sq mi)

The Pavlograd uezd (Russian: Павлоградскій уѣздъ, romanized: Pavlogradskiy uyezd; Ukrainian: Павлоградський повіт, romanized: Pavlohrads'kyi povit) was one of the subdivisions of the Yekaterinoslav Governorate of the Russian Empire. It was situated in the northern part of the governorate. Its administrative centre was Pavlograd (Pavlohrad).

== Demographics ==
At the time of the Russian Empire Census of 1897, Pavlogradsky Uyezd had a population of 251,460. Of these, 79.7% spoke Ukrainian, 14.4% Russian, 2.9% Yiddish, 2.3% German, 0.2% Polish, 0.2% Belarusian, 0.1% Tatar and 0.1% Romani as their native language.
