= Vasily Osipov =

Soviet long-range bomber pilot (1917–1991)

Vasily Nikolaevich Osipov
- Василий Николаевич Осипов
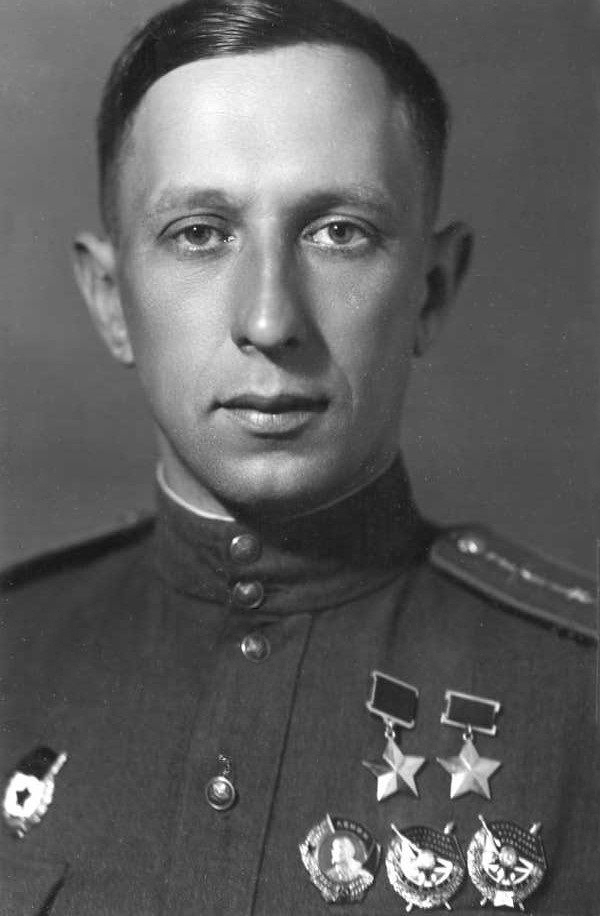
- Born: 30 December [O.S. 17 December] 1917; Petrograd, Russian Empire
- Died: 16 July 1991 (aged 73); Saint Petersburg, Soviet Union
- Military career
- Allegiance: Soviet Union
- Branch: Soviet Air Force
- Rank: Major
- Unit: 5th Guards Long-Range Bomber Aviation Regiment
- Conflicts: World War II
- Awards: Hero of the Soviet Union (twice)

Vasily Nikolaevich Osipov (Russian: Василий Николаевич Осипов; 30 December [O.S. 17 December] 1917 – 16 July 1991) was a Soviet long-range bomber pilot who was twice awarded the title of Hero of the Soviet Union.

== Early life ==
Osipov was born on 30 December [O.S. 17 December] 1917 in Petrograd to a working-class Russian family. After completing his tenth grade of school he focused on his dream of following in his father's footsteps by joining the military, participating in sharpshooting and sports before joining the Red Army in August 1937. After graduating from the 1st Chkalov Military Aviation School of Pilots in November 1940 he was posted to the 169th Reserve Aviation Regiment, based in Voronezh. Shortly before the German invasion of the Soviet Union he transferred to the 231st Long-Range Bomber Aviation Regiment in May 1941.

== World War II ==
Shortly after entering combat in July 1941, Osipov transferred to the 81st Long Range Bomber Aviation Regiment in August 1941, which was honored with the guards designation and renamed to the 5th Guards Long Range Bomber Aviation Regiment one year later. He soon accomplished difficult missions, destroying a heavily-protected targets and difficult to find targets with direct hits, including; a crossing on the Dnieper river on 24 September 1941, a crossing through the Miusskaya estuary on 3 October 1941, and the headquarters of an enemy military unit on 23 October 1941. On 20 May 1942 we was nominated for the Order of Lenin for having flown 115 sorties on the Il-4, which included 90 night missions and five deep into enemy-controlled territory, totaling 304 flight hours and dropping nearly 150 tons of bombs on targets. However, the award nomination was changed by Alexander Golovanov to a nomination for the title Hero of the Soviet Union in addition to the Order of Lenin, resulting in Osipov receiving his first gold star on 20 June 1942. He continued to tally more sorties, and was promoted to the position of deputy squadron commander before being nominated for a second gold star on 30 November 1943. Upon receiving notice that his family died in the siege of Leningrad in 1944, he became enraged and flew with increased zeal. Shortly after Soviet Long-Range Aviation units were consolidated into the 18th Air Army in December 1944, Osipov transferred to the 26th Guards Bomber Aviation Regiment, where he flew as a squadron commander, participating in the bombing of Konigsberg and Berlin. During one mission over Konigsberg, a 100-kilogram bomb from another aircraft fell through the wing of his B-25 bomber, leaving a large hole in the wing. Despite the damage to the wing, fuselage, and engine, Osipov carefully flew the plane to an airfield and made a successful emergency landing. By the end of the war he totaled 412 sorties, more than any other Soviet long-range aviation pilot. Of the 412 sorties flown on the Il-14 and B-25, 382 were at night.

== Postwar ==
Until the reorganization of Soviet long-range aviation in April 1946, Osipov remained a squadron commander in the 26th Guards Bomber Regiment. He then transferred to the 199th Guards Bomber Regiment, where he was also squadron commander, but left in November 1948. Before returning to the regiment one year later he graduated from the Higher Officer Flight and Tactical School of Long-Range Aviation. In October 1950 he transferred to the 250th Guards Bomber Regiment, but less than two years later he transferred to be a deputy squadron commander in the 238th Guards Bomber Regiment, where he remained until leaving the military in April 1954 for health reasons. During his career he flew the B-25, Li-2, and Tu-4. He lived out the remainder of his life in Leningrad, where he died on 16 July 1991.

== Awards and honors ==
- Twice Hero of the Soviet Union (20 June 1942 and 13 March 1944)
- Order of Lenin (20 June 1942)
- Two Order of the Red Banner (5 November 1941 and 28 April 1943)
- Order of Alexander Nevsky (2 October 1945)
- Order of the Patriotic War 1st class (11 March 1985)
- campaign and jubilee medals

== See also ==
- Alexander Molodchy
- Pavel Taran
