= Governor's House (Dnipro) =

Historical building in Dnipro, Ukraine

- Будинок губернатора
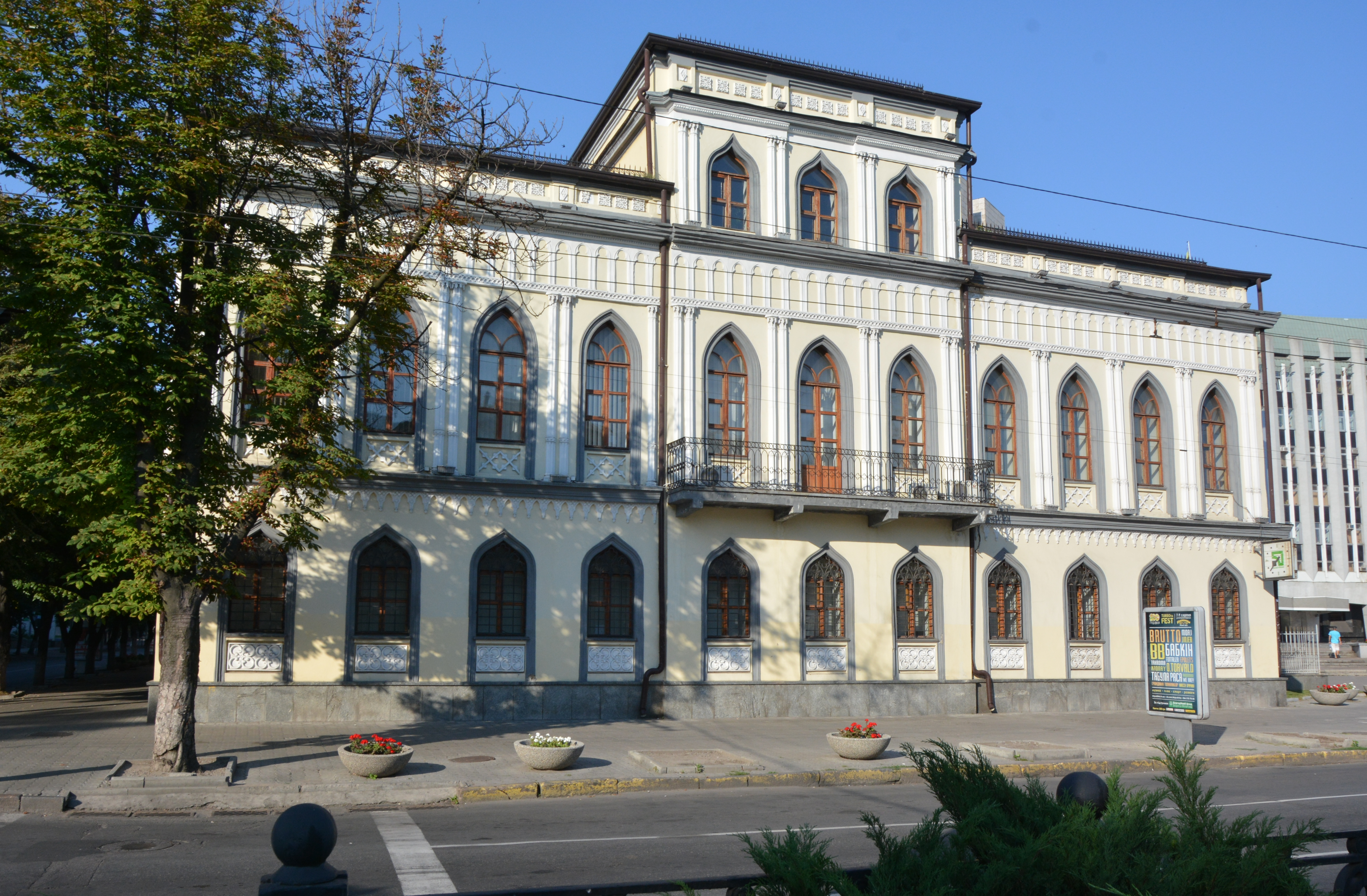
- The building in 2015
- Interactive map of the Governor's House area

General information
- Architectural style: neo-Gothic
- Location: Dnipro, Ukraine, Voskresenska Street
- Coordinates: 48°28′00″N 35°02′28″E
- Current tenants: Museum of Dnipro City History
- Completed: 19th century
- Opened: 1850
- Renovated: 1998
- Owner: Dnipro City Council

Design and construction
- Designations: 1979

Immovable Monument of National Significance of Ukraine
- Official name: Губернаторський будинок (Governor's House)
- Type: Architecture
- Reference no.: 040032

The Governor's House (Ukrainian: Будинок губернатора, romanized: Budynok hubernatora) is a 19th-century historical building in the city of Dnipro, Ukraine. The name "Governor's House" originated when the central treasury bought the building at the intersection of Voskresenska Street and Ekaterininsky Prospekt to move the governor of Yekaterinoslav and his office there in 1887. It is home to the Museum of Dnipro City History since 2020.

== Design ==
The structure is a two-story building with a mezzanine in the center, and was designed using neo-Gothic architectural features inside and out. The L-shaped home is primarily two stories with a centrally expanded three stories made of brick and plaster. The second floor's windows are pointed, while the first floor's windows are ring-shaped. Iron castings, fireplaces, and marble finishes have all been retained within.

There was a yard on the side of the road within the estate. Along the avenue, a sizable garden was constructed; the area was used as a park until the late 1970s. The major was given permission to build a stone fence and add on to the house's stone wing in March 1860. A one-story service building was constructed in 1901 on Voskresenska Street to house the governor's guard.

The second-floor stained glass window, cornice profiles, and décor was restored during the 2021 rebuild. The building's original painting's hues and missing décor pieces will also be restored. The building's renovated facade will be lit up.

== History ==
It is one of the earliest homes in Dnipropetrovsk was constructed in 1830 (although some sources place the year of construction at 1850), as the house of Major Grigory Ivanovich Shcherbakov. He was in charge of the provincial excise administration and had the funds to construct a two-story structure. Despite this, the building was leased to the English Club for a while in 1850. The leasing rate of the buildings has grown from 4.5 thousand to 5.5 thousand rubles per year in tandem with the expansion of the English Club. Additionally, the governor started to view the housing issue as an important matter.

The approval of the Katerynoslav Governor's petition to buy the building was given, and on 26 May 1887, Emperor Alexander III approved the decision to buy a home was granted; it now belonged to the Ministry of Internal Affairs. The parcel of land with the buildings cost 65 thousand rubles, and an extra 60 thousand had to be paid for repairs and building new space. It should be remembered that the development and repair plans were not carried out in their entirety. Thirteen governors presented their work at the Governor's House.

The subject of whether a new facility is necessary was brought up by the province's bureaucratic apparatus's unceasing expansion. Simultaneously, there were plans to sell the residence. The Governor's House with a piece of land and auxiliary buildings cost 408,094 rubles in 1914. But the start of World War I caused some revisions, and the decision to sell and construct a new structure was put off. There were many developments throughout the tumultuous following years. Here was the interim regional commissar's office, and then the German military command.

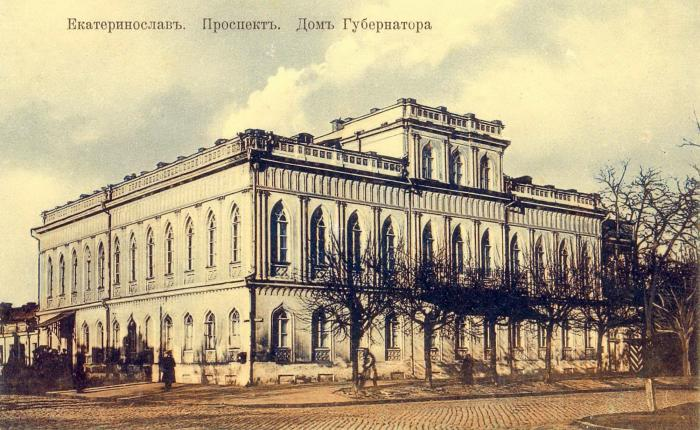
The building in the 20th century

This building had a slew of renamings following the October Revolution, with different owners taking it for over fifty years. It was known as Ekaterinoslav Smolny during the revolution since here was the location of the Council of Workers' and Soldiers' Deputies in December 1917. Because of this, the structure was placed under governmental protection as a historical monument. The provincial executive committee held this position from 1919 to 1934, when it was replaced by the Teacher's House, the House of Pioneers, the DOSAAF committee, the statistics department, the organization of young ensembles and discos, and the design institute.

The House of Enlightenment occupied the building in 1926; in 1929, it was home to the House of Scientists, the House of Education Workers, the Consulting Reference Bureau, and the police district reserve for horses. The House of Education Workers was founded there in 1931, followed by the House of Scientists of Workers and Dnipromyskkomundivision in 1932.

The building later housed the Dnipropetrovsk City House of Pioneers on 1 May 1934. The home turned become a popular destination for citywide schoolchildren. This place was home to several kid-focused amateur art and technological creative organizations. A two-story addition was built on the right side of the avenue to accommodate the House of Pioneers, but was demolished in the early 1980s.

During the Great Patriotic War, the building came under shelling in August and September 1941. Repairs to restore it started in January 1942 and finished in March of the same year. The residence has served a visiting house since 1942. The buildings on the site's northwest and south-western borders were demolished during the fighting for the city's liberation. The main building and the one-story structure that is linked to it on the street side did not sustain any serious damages. 1950 saw improvements made to the area and repairs made to the buildings.

A proposal to rebuild the park and complete a new structure was planned in 1962. A three-story structure at the end of Leninska Street was placed into use in August 1964. Concurrently, the 1901 erected one-story building was demolished while under the guardianship of the governor. The organization has been known as the Zoe Kosmodemyanska Schoolchildren and Pioneers Palace since 1965. The land on which the new Victory movie theater was to be built was suggested in 1968, but the project was never carried out. The building housed the Central Design Bureau of Local Industry of the USSR, the Design Department II, the Palace of Pioneers, the Method Cabinet of the City Department of Public Education, and several others in 1971.

The structure was designated as a republican-significant architectural monument in 1979. The home was abandoned from 1983 to 1997, without anyone living there, without lights or heat, and, worst of all, without locks. After a considerable amount of time, the municipal authorities could no longer stand the presence of rats and illnesses in the city center and soon started discussing the necessity of demolishing the structure. However, luckily, the building's historical significance was preserved by the intellectuals in the area.

The building saw new plans by the end of 1990. Subsequently, Dnepropetrovsk utilities took responsibility for the building since it was intended to house a Museum of Communal Services. But this proposal never materialized, and the home lay abandoned for a while until PrivatBank took an interest in it in 1997. They completed restoration of the building in 1998, and changed to its previous name, the Governor's House.

The building's front is scheduled to be rebuilt for 16 million hryvnias, and architects have already finished developing the concept. This announcement was made on 27 August 2021 with work expected to begin at the end of September 2021. The Governor's House hosted the creation of the first phase of the Museum of Dnipro City History's exhibition in 2020, and second phase in 2021. The museum introduced interactive exhibit covers a wide range of topics, including the sociocultural life of the city, the history of commerce and banking in the area, and the origins and growth of the city in the 18th and 20th centuries.

== Gallery ==
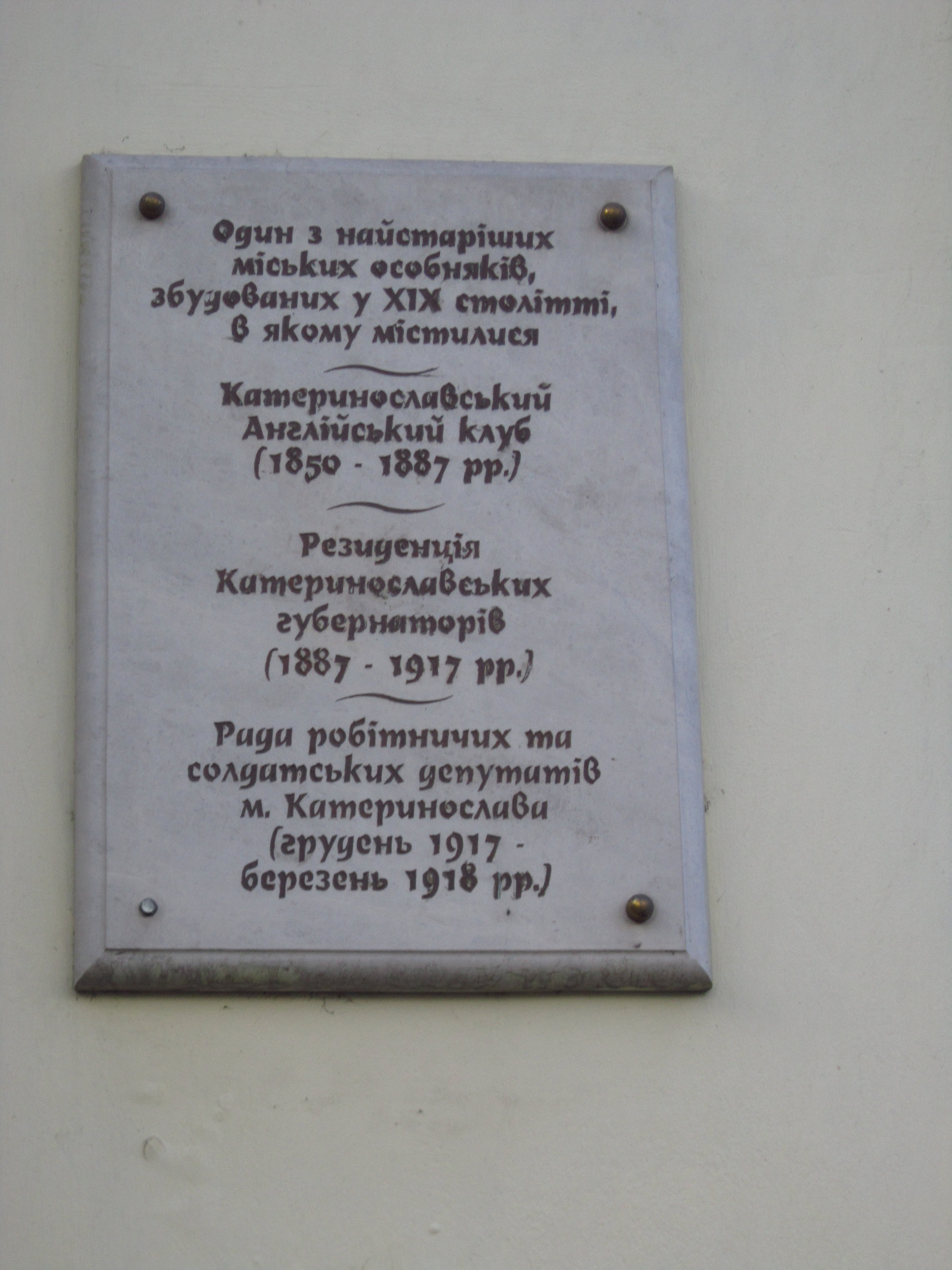
Commemorative plaque on the house's exterior

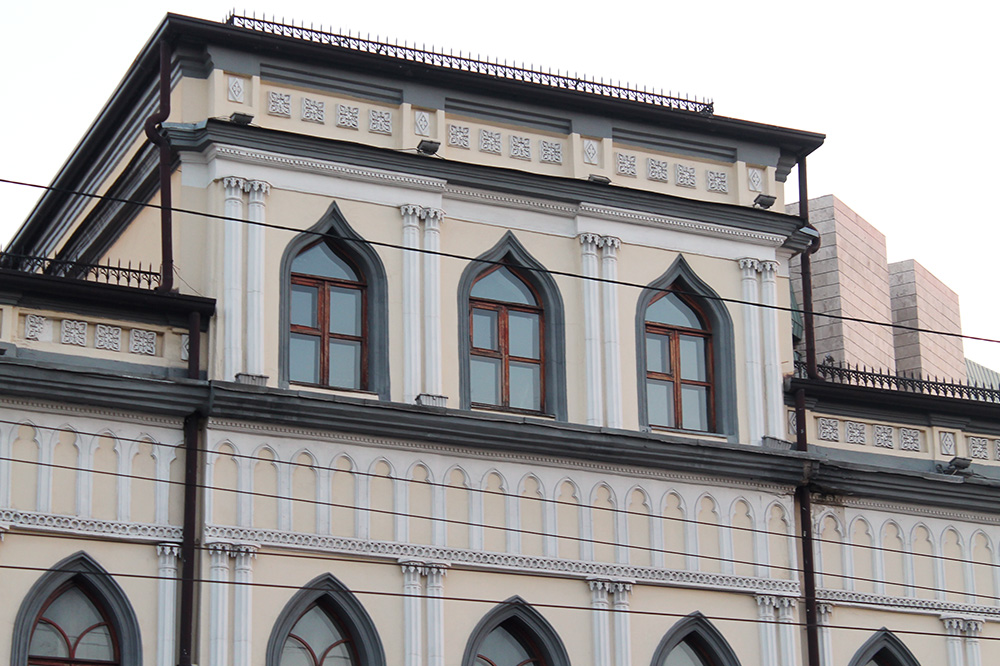
Mezzanine on the building in 2016

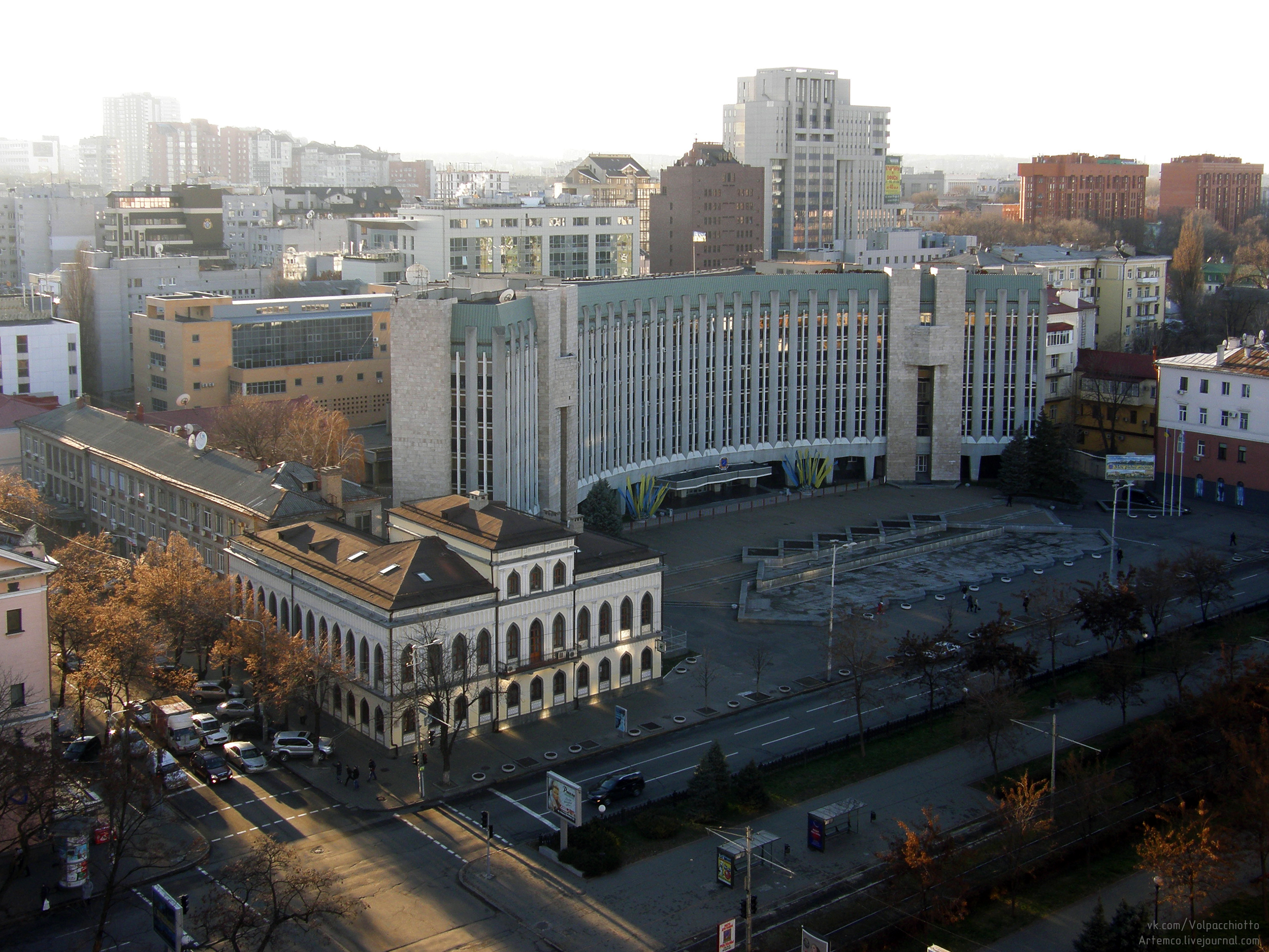
The house alongside the Dnipro City Council in 2013

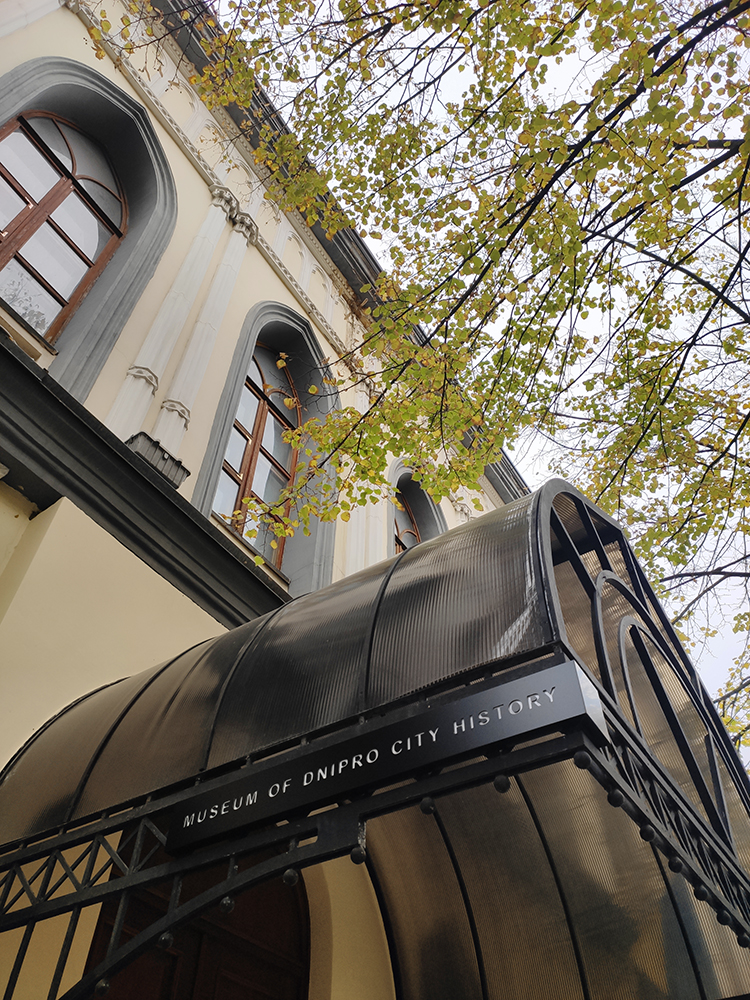
Museum of Dnipro City History in 2020

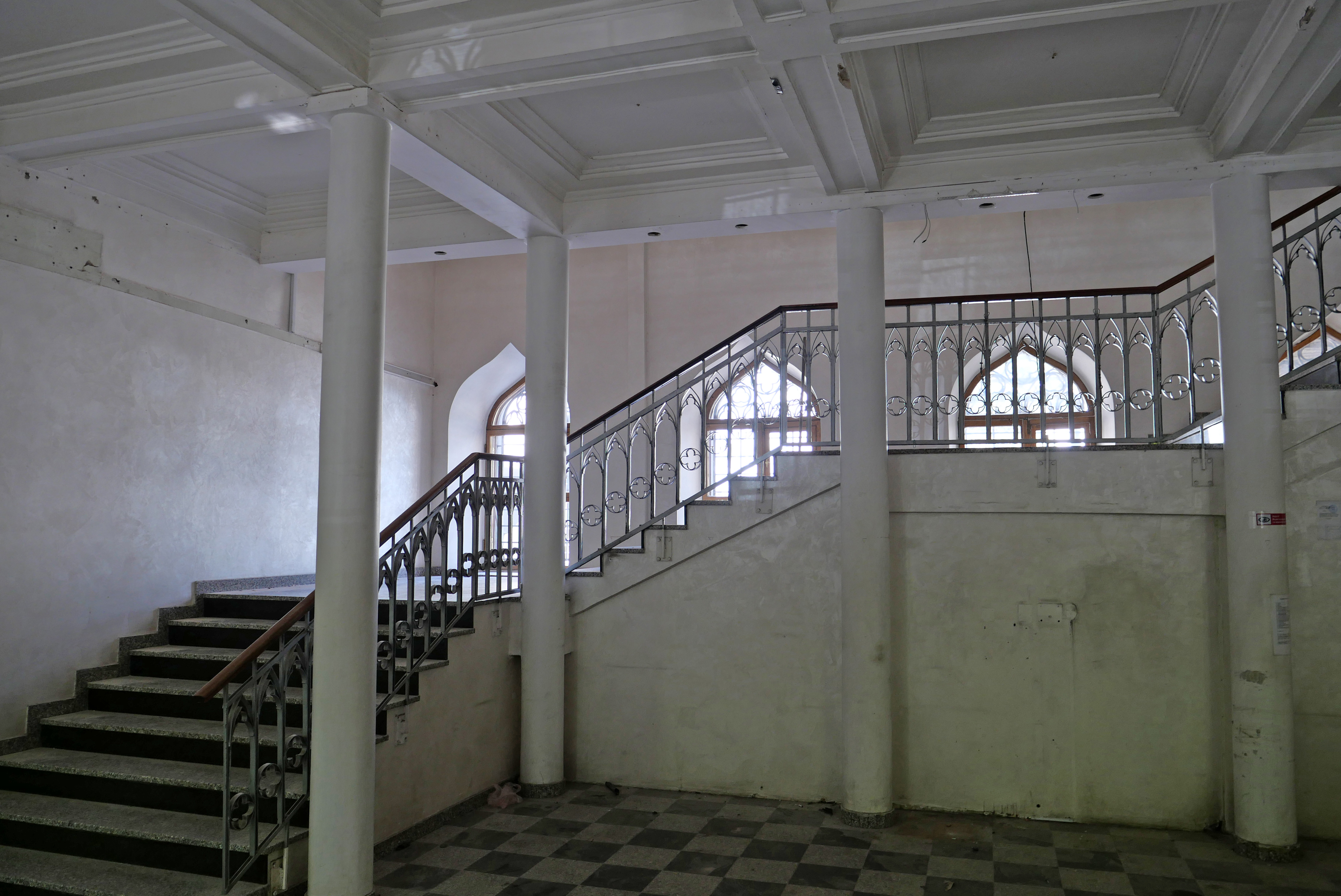
The building's interior in 2020
