= Cape Fiolent =

Cape and nature reserve in Sevastopol, Crimea

Cape Fiolent Nature Reserve
- Felenk Burun (Crimean Tatar); Мис Фіолент (Ukrainian); Мыс Фиолент (Russian)
- IUCN category IV (habitat/species management area)
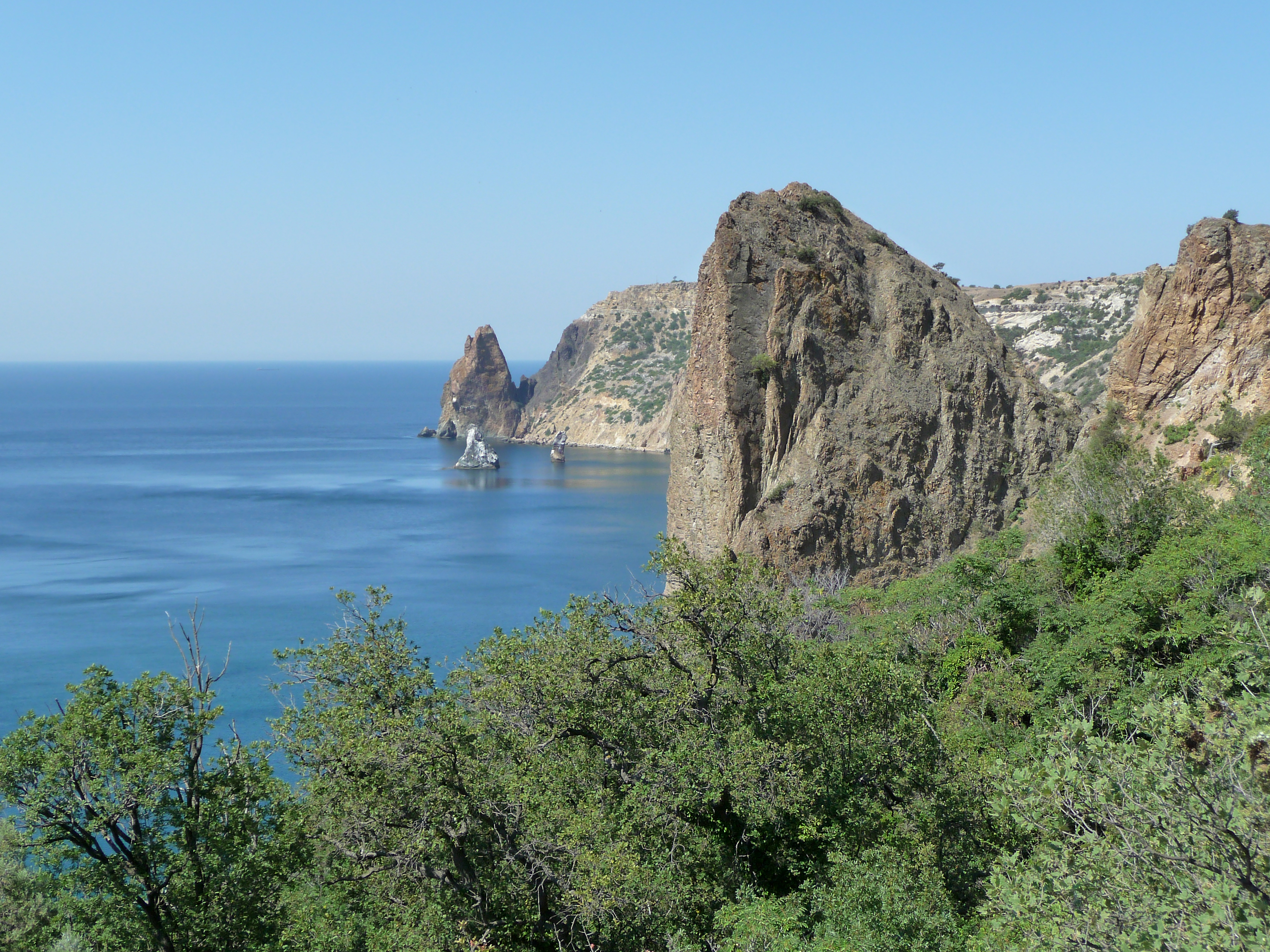

- Location within Sevastopol Location within Crimea Location within Ukraine
- Nearest city: Sevastopol
- Coordinates: 44°29′55″N 33°29′20″E
- Area: 37.1 ha (0.371 km^{2})
- Established: 20 August 1996

Cape Fiolent (Crimean Tatar: Felenk Burun; Ukrainian: Фіолент; Russian: Фиолент; Latin: Parthenium), also historically called Cape Fiolente, is a cape and nature reserve (zakaznik) located in southern Sevastopol, a city within Crimea that is internationally recognised as part of Ukraine but currently occupied by Russia since 2014.

== Description ==
Made up of volcanic rock, Cape Fiolent was formed more than 150 million years ago from volcanic eruptions. Various minerals can be found in the Cape's rock.

Cape Fiolent has been noted for its beauty. In particular are its rock formations and picturesque, quiet beaches. Of particular significance is the Jasper Beach and the 891-step staircase descending from the Cape to the beach. The Cape is also noted for the Saint George monastery, a Ukrainian Orthodox Church (Moscow Patriarchate) monastery, and the Rock of the Holy Apparition.

== History ==
During ancient times, Cape Fiolent was known under the name of Parthenium (Παρθένιον), in connection to Greek mythology. According to Greek mythology, Iphigenia was taken to an area in southern Crimea. Strabo writes that the place was named after the deity "Parthenos" (Παρθένος, "Virgin"). At the cape there was a shrine or temple and a xoanon of this female divinity. Scholars are uncertain about her identity, since Strabo is deliberately ambiguous, they believe that she may have been a local deity, Artemis or more likely Iphigenia.

According to local legend, in 891 C.E., Byzantine sailors passing by Cape Fiolent encountered stormy seas and were saved by an apparition of Saint George appearing on what is now known as the Rock of the Holy Apparition. After the storm passed, the sailors discovered an icon and founded the Saint George monastery, additionally placing a cross on the Rock of the Holy Apparition. During the Middle Ages, Cape Fiolent was known as Saint George, after the monastery. The monastery was closed by the government of the Soviet Union, but later revived.

The name of Cape Fiolent descends from the Genoese colonisation of Crimea, when the cape was referred to as "violent" (Italian: violento) for its turbulent waves. In the 1800s, Joseph Needham painted multiple images of Cape Fiolent.

During the 2022 Russian invasion of Ukraine, Russian military bases on Cape Fiolent were attacked by Ukrainian forces.
