= Slavyanoserbsk uezd =

Slavyanoserbsk uezd Славяносербскій уѣздъ
- Uezd
- Coat of arms

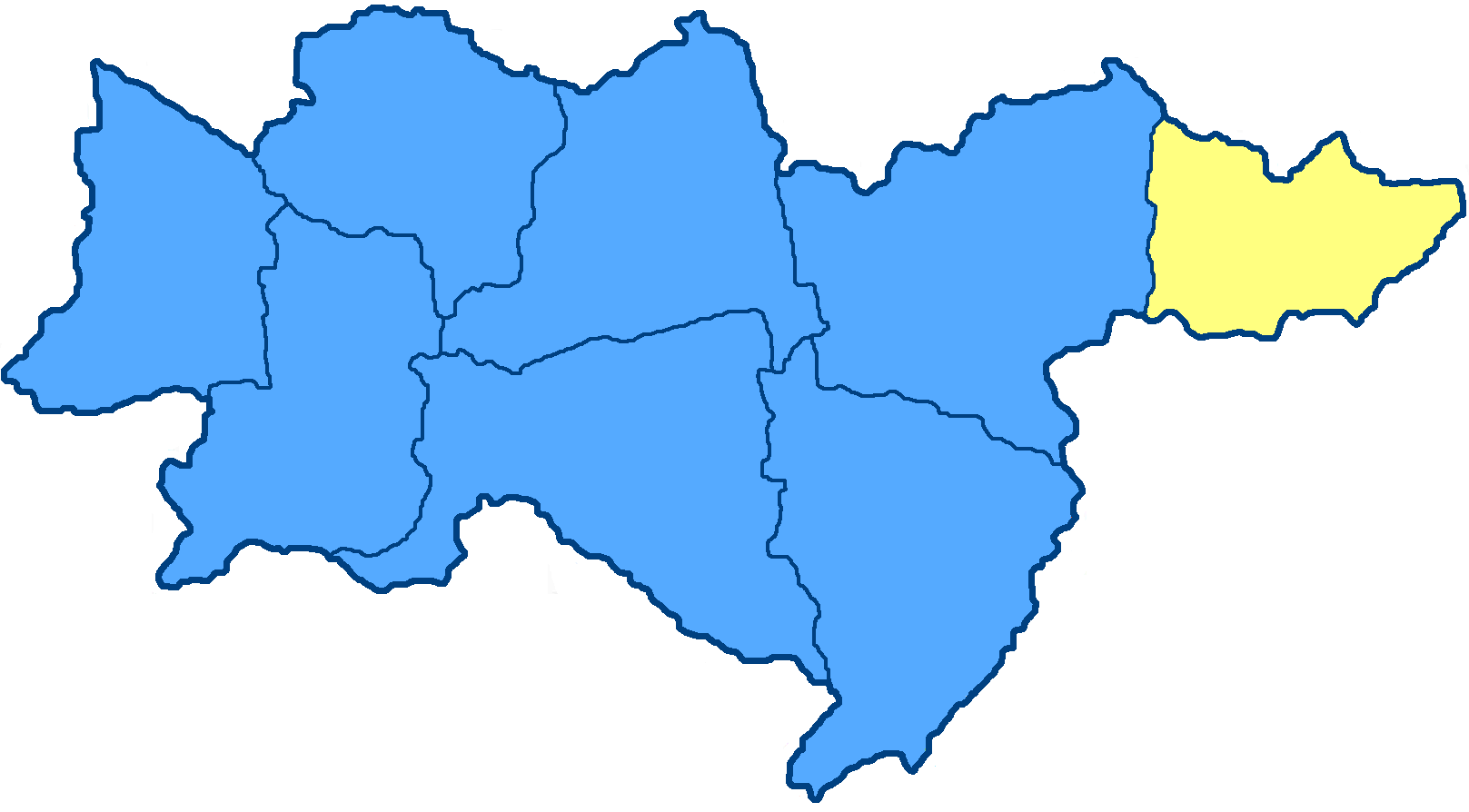
- Location in the Yekaterinoslav Governorate
- Country: Russian Empire
- Governorate: Yekaterinoslav
- Established: 1802
- Abolished: 1923
- Capital: Slavyanoserbsk; Lugansk (from 1882)

Area
  - Total: 5,089.18 km^{2} (1,964.94 sq mi)

Population (1897)
  - Total: 174,753
  - Density: 34.3381/km^{2} (88.9354/sq mi)

The Slavyanoserbsk uezd (Russian: Славяносербскій уѣздъ, romanized: Slavyanoserbskiy uyezd; Ukrainian: Слов'яносербський повіт, romanized: Slovianoserbs'kyi povit) was one of the subdivisions of the Yekaterinoslav Governorate of the Russian Empire. It was situated in the eastern part of the governorate. Its administrative centre was Slovianoserbsk until 1882 and Luhansk after that.

== Demographics ==
At the time of the Russian Empire Census of 1897, Slavyanoserbsky Uyezd had a population of 174,753. Of these, 50.5% spoke Ukrainian, 45.4% Russian, 1.5% Yiddish, 0.9% Belarusian, 0.5% German, 0.5% Moldovan or Romanian, 0.3% Polish, 0.1% Romani, 0.1% Tatar, 0.1% Armenian and 0.1% French as their native language.
