= Bakhmut uezd =

Bakhmut uezd Бахмутскій уѣздъ
- Uezd
- Coat of arms

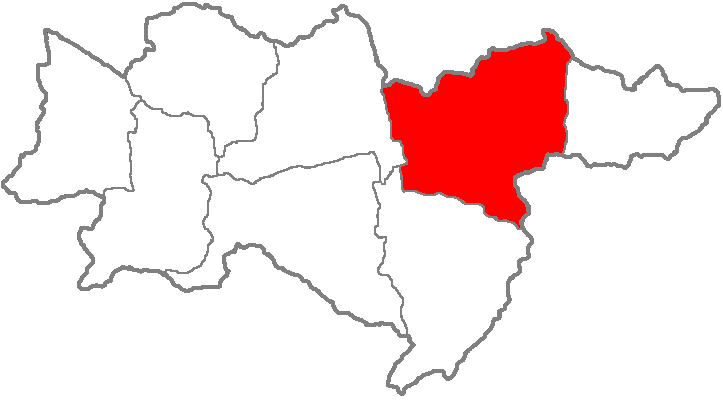
- Location in the Yekaterinoslav Governorate
- Country: Russian Empire
- Governorate: Yekaterinoslav
- Established: 1783
- Abolished: 1923
- Capital: Bakhmut

Area
  - Total: 9,225.13 km^{2} (3,561.84 sq mi)

Population (1897)
  - Total: 332,478
  - Density: 36.0405/km^{2} (93.3444/sq mi)

Bakhmut uezd (Russian: Бахмутский уезд, romanized: Bakhmutskiy uyezd, pre-1918: Бахмутскій уѣздъ; Ukrainian: Бахмутський повіт, romanized: Bakhmuts'kyi povit) was an administrative subdivision, or uezd, of the Yekaterinoslav Governorate in the Russian Empire. The city of Bakhmut served as its capital.

== Demographics ==
At the time of the 1897 Russian Empire census, Bakhmut uezd had a population of 332,478 people. Language prevalence by percent of native speakers in the subdivision was: 58.2% Ukrainian, 31.2% Russian, 3.8% German, 2.8% Yiddish, 1.9% Moldovan or Romanian, 0.7% Belarusian, 0.6% Polish, 0.1% French, 0.1% Tatar, 0.1% English, 0.1% Armenian, and 0.1% Romani.
