= Yekaterinoslav Governorate =

1802–1925 administrative unit

Coordinates: 48.4500°N 34.9833°E

Екатеринославская губерния
- 1802–1925
- Coat of arms

- Location in the Russian Empire
- Capital: Yekaterinoslav/Katerinoslav
- Area
  - (1897): 63,391.61 km^{2} (24,475.64 sq mi)
- Population
  - (1897): 2,113,674
- History
  - Established: 1802
  - Abolished: 1925
Preceded by
Novorossiya Governorate
Zaporizhzhia Governorate
Donets Governorate
Succeeded by
Oleksandrivsk Governorate
Donets Governorate
Katerinoslav Okruha
Kriviy Rih Okruha
Zaporizhzhia Okruha
Pavlohrad Okruha
Melitopol Okruha

Yekaterinoslav Governorate (Note: Russian: Екатериносла́вская губе́рния, pre-reform orthography: Екатериносла́вская губе́рнія, romanized: Yekaterinoslávskaya gubérniya; Ukrainian: Катериносла́вська губе́рнія, romanized: Katerynoslávsʼka hubérniia; Sometimes in English as well: Ekaterinoslav Governorate; Also known as Katerynoslavshchyna, (Ukrainian: Катеринославщина; Russian: Екатеринославщина, romanized: Yekaterinoslavshchina)) was an administrative-territorial unit (guberniya) of the Russian Empire, with its capital in Yekaterinoslav. Covering an area of 63,392 km^{2} (24,476 mi^{2}), and having 2,113,674 inhabitants according to the census of 1897, it bordered Poltava Governorate to the north, Don Host Oblast to the east, Sea of Azov to the southeast, Taurida Governorate to the south, and Kherson Governorate to the west, and covered the area of the Luhansk, Donetsk, Dnipropetrovsk, and Zaporizhzhia Oblasts of modern Ukraine.

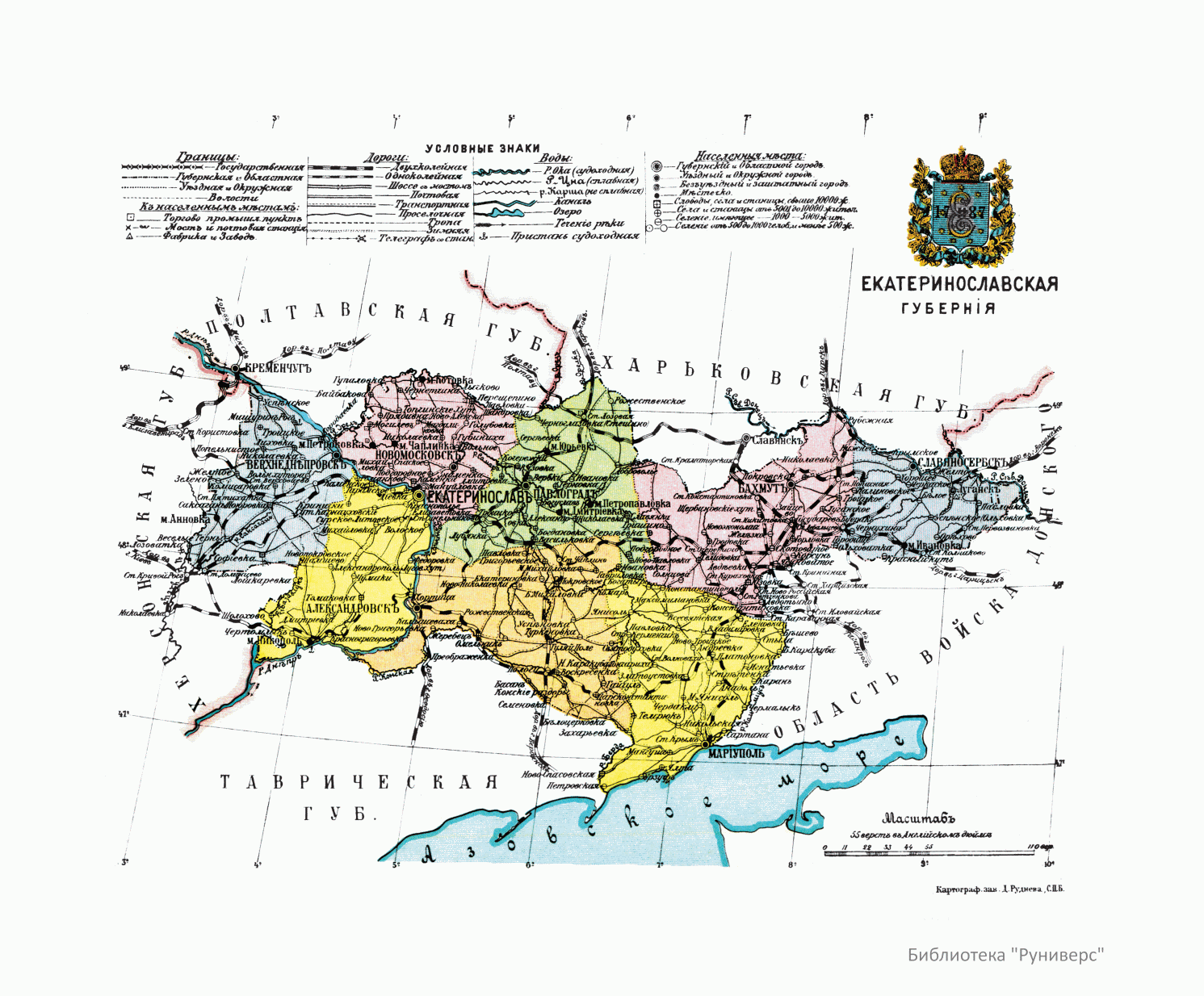
Yekaterinoslav Governorate in 1913

== Location ==
The government was created in 1802 when the Novorossiya Governorate was split into three governorates. The Yekaterinoslav Governorate bordered to the north with the Kharkov Governorate and Poltava Governorate, to the west and southwest with the Kherson Governorate, to the south with the Taurida Governorate and Sea of Azov, and to the east with Don Host Oblast.

== Administrative divisions ==
The governorate was created in place of Novorossiysk Governorate in 1802 and encompassed a huge area of the southern Ukraine. Officially, the new governorate was created as Ekaterinoslav Governorate in 1802 and subdivided into the following uyezds with centres in:

County		County Town	Arms of County Town	Area	Population (1897 census)
Transliteration name	Russian Cyrillic	County Town	Arms of County Town	Area	Population (1897 census)
Aleksandrovsky	Александровскій	Aleksandrovsk		10,015.8 km^{2} (3,867.1 mi^{2})	271,678
Bakhmutsky	Бахмутскій	Bakhmut		9,224.8 km^{2} (3,561.7 mi^{2})	332,478
Verkhnedneprovsky	Верхнеднѣпровскій	Verkhnedniprovsk		6,862.3 km^{2} (2,649.5 mi^{2})	211,674
Yekaterinoslavsky	Екатеринославскій	Yekaterinoslav		7,858 km^{2} (3,034 mi^{2})	357,207
Mariupolsky	Маріупольскій	Mariupol		8,989.2 km^{2} (3,470.7 mi^{2})	254,056
Novomoskovsky	Невомосковскій	Novomoskovsk		6,532 km^{2} (2,522 mi^{2})	260,368
Pavlogradsky	Павлоградскій	Pavlograd		8,815.7 km^{2} (3,403.8 mi^{2})	251,460
Slavyanoserbsky	Славяносербскій	Lugansk		5,089 km^{2} (1,965 mi^{2})	174,753

1. Taganrog city (Таганрог) 1802–1887
2. Rostov upon Don city 1802–1887

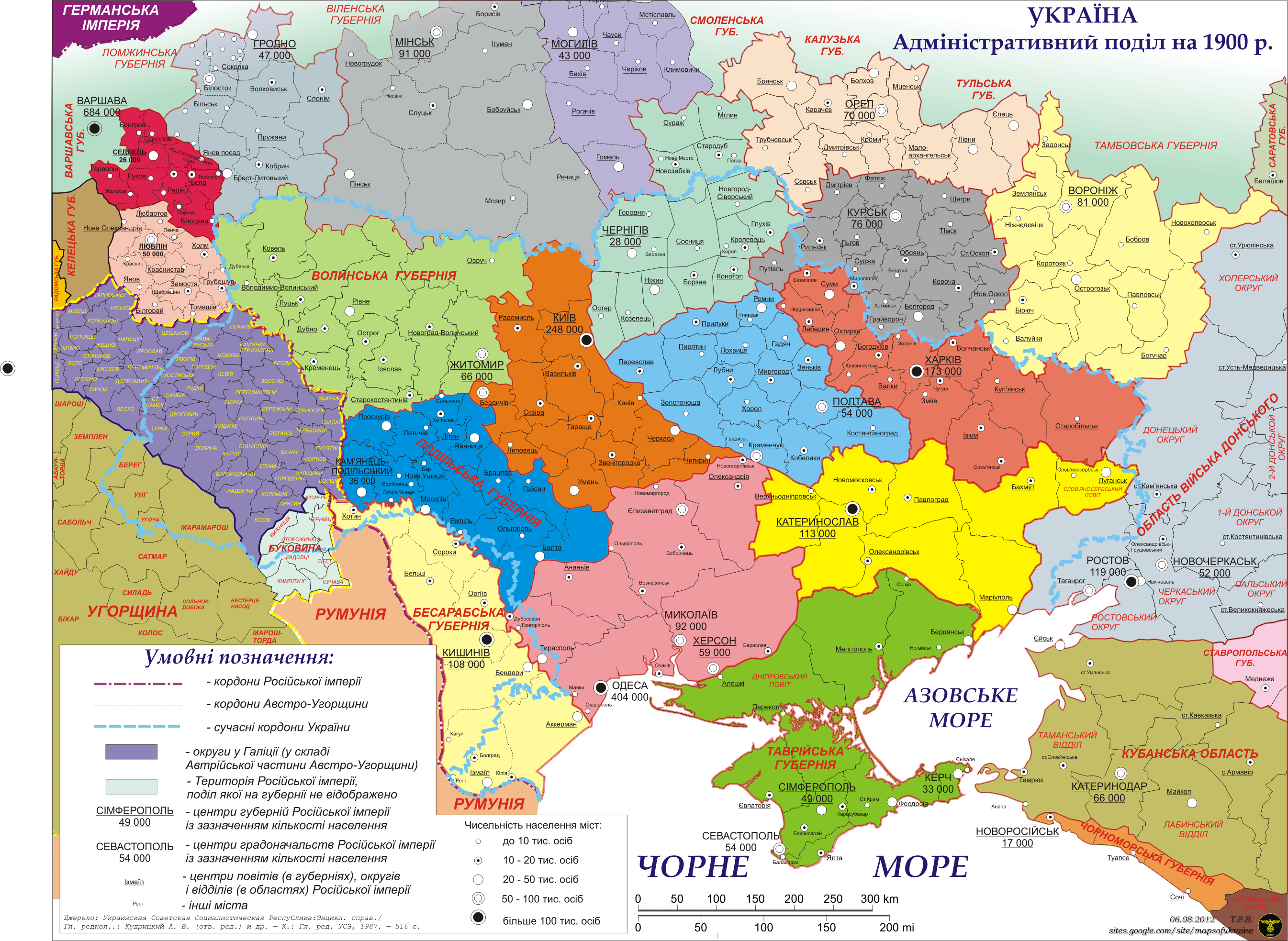
Ukraine's modern border superimposed on the administrative division of 1900 for both the Russian and the Austro-Hungarian Empires. The borders of the uyezds can be seen from this map

=== Changes in Russian Empire ===
- 1874, the Mariupol (Марiуполь) uyezd was split off the Aleksandrovsk uyezd.
- 1887, Rostov-na-Donu city as well as Taganrog city with its uyezd were transferred back to the Don Host Oblast.

=== Ukraine ===
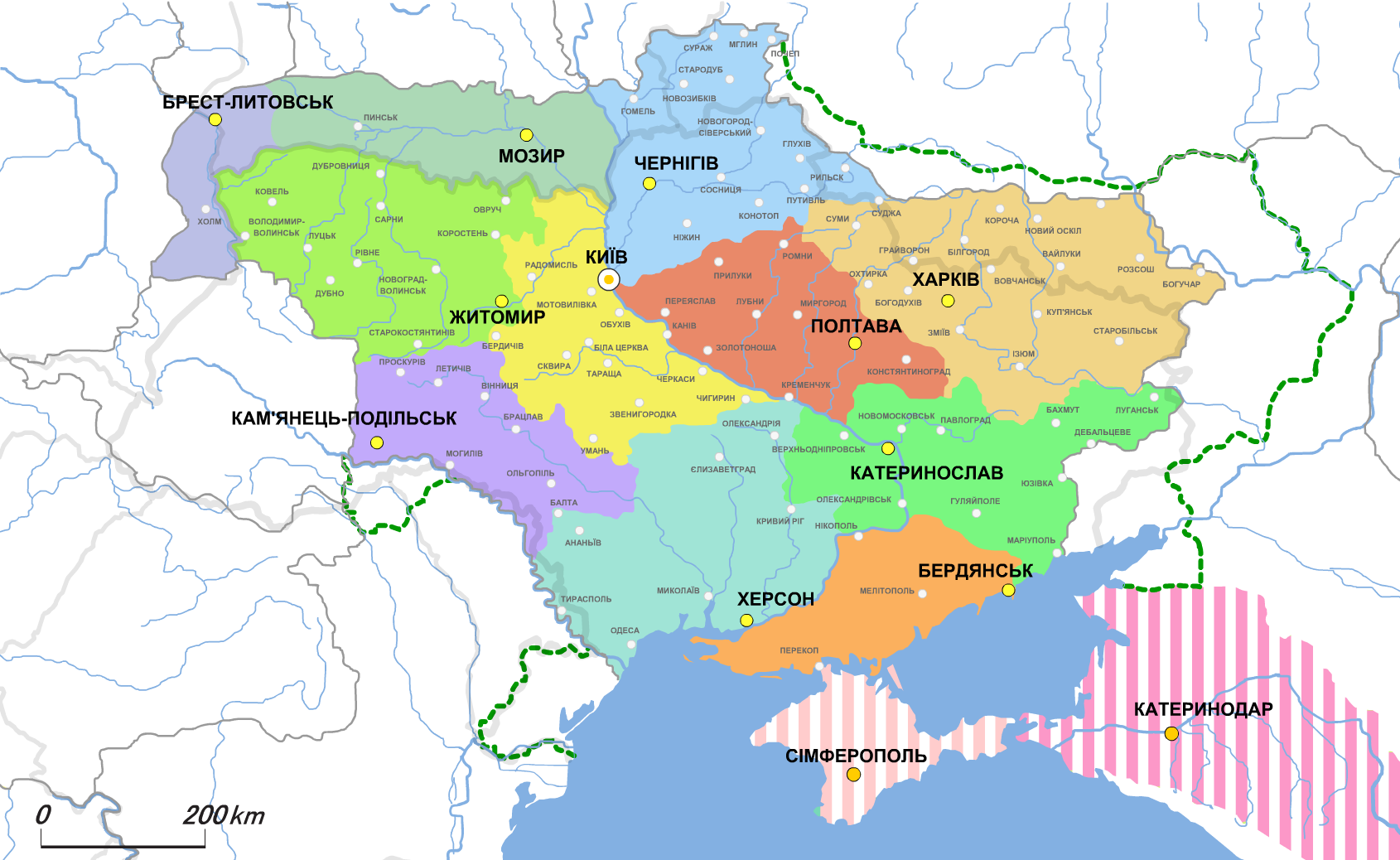
Katerynoslav Governorate (turquoise) in the Ukrainian State

- 1918, Taganrog uyezd was transferred once again, but without the Taganrog city and later again returned to the Don Voisko Province. The Ukrainian People's Republic passed the law for the reformation of the Ukrainian administrative division dividing the governorate into five new lands. The law has failed to be implemented and was canceled due to the conservative coup d'état of Pavlo Skoropadsky and establishment of the Ukrainian State. Thus the territory of the governorate was left unchanged and sustained without any major changes until 1919.

=== South Russia ===
- 1919 Krivyi Rih uyezd was created partially out of the newly annexed lands of the Kherson Governorate.

=== Soviet Ukraine ===
- 1920 Governorate yielded few territories in favor of the newly created Olexandrivsk (Alexandrovsk) Governorate and Donetsk Governorate
- 1922 Zaporizhia Governorate, as renamed, was abolished and its territories returned under the subordination of Yekaterinoslav Governorate together with some of Kremenchuk Governorate.
- 1923 All Governorates uyezds were reformed into seven okrugs with two of them (Berdiansk and Oleksandriysk okrugs) liquidated on 3 June 1925.
- On 1 August 1925, the Yekaterinoslav Governorate administration was discontinued.

=== Okrugs (okruhas) ===
List of okruhas of Ukraine upon the dissolution of the Governorate:

1. Yekaterinoslav
2. Zaporizhia
3. Kryvyi Rih
4. Melitopol
5. Pavlohrad

== Demographics ==
The governorate's population, a majority of peasants, was 662,000 in 1811, 902,400 in 1851, 1,204,800 in 1863, and 1,792,800 in 1885. From the second half of the 19th century, with the founding of Yuzovka (Donetsk), the governorate became the coal-mining and metallurgical center of the then Ukraine, incorporating the Dnieper Industrial Region and the Donbass (Donets Basin).

Its population increased to 2,113,674 by 1897. The nationalities within the governorate were Ukrainians – 68.9%, Russians – 17.3%, Jews (4.7%), Germans (3.8%), Greeks (2.3%), and Tatars (0.8%). In 1924, the governorate had 3,424,100 (13.6% urban) inhabitants, living in 5,165 settlements, 36 of them being cities and urban-type settlements. The largest social class was that of workers (about 25%).

=== Principal cities ===
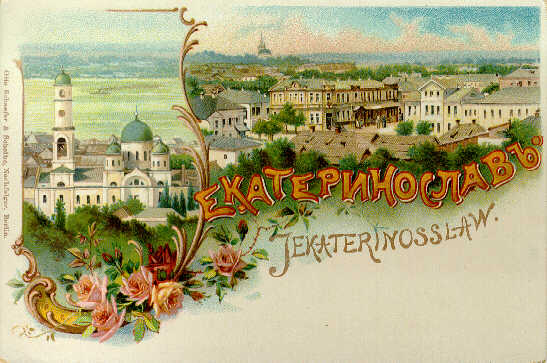
An old postcard depicting Yekaterinoslav, the governorate's capital at the time.

The data is taken from demoscope.ru. Here is also the most common language composition.

- Yekaterinoslav – 112,839 (1897), (Russian – 47,140, Jewish – 39,979, Ukrainian – 17,787)
- Mariupol – 31,116 (Russian – 19,670, Jewish – 4,710, Ukrainian – 3,125)
- Lugansk – 20,404 (Russian – 13,907, Ukrainian – 3,902, Jewish – 1,449)
- Bakhmut – 19,316 (Ukrainian – 11,928, Russian – 3,659, Jewish – 3,223)
- Aleksandrovsk – 18,849 (Ukrainian – 8,101, Jewish – 5,248, Russian – 4,667)
- Pavlograd 15,775 (Russian – 5,421, Ukrainian – 5,273, Jewish – 4,353)
- Novomoskovsk – 12,883 (Ukrainian – 9,956, Jewish – 1,436, Russian – 1,237)
- Verkhnedneprovsk – 6,501 (Ukrainian – 3,752, Jewish – 2,061, Russian – 739)
- Slavianoserbsk – 3,122 (Russian – 1,607, Ukrainian – 1,342, Jewish – 143)

From the turn of the 19th century until 1887 city of Rostov-na-Donu and all the Taganrog uyezd were part of the governorate, but before the census of 1897 took place they were transferred to the Don Oblast. Note that the biggest city of the guberniya was the city of Rostov-na-Donu while Taganrog was not much smaller and the third in size. Here is the data on them:

- Rostov-na-Donu – 119,476 (Russian – 94,673, Jewish – 11,183, Ukrainian – 5,612)
- Taganrog – 51,437 (Russian – 40,899, Ukrainian – 4,676, Jewish – 2,685)

== Language ==
- By the Imperial census of 1897.

Native language	Yekaterinoslav Governorate Екатеринославская губерния		For each uyezd (district)							
Native language	Yekaterinoslav Governorate Екатеринославская губерния		Yekaterinoslav Екатеринославский уезд	Pavlograd Павлоградский уезд	Bakhmut Бахмутский уезд	Novomoskovsk Новомосковский уезд	Mariupol Мариупольский уезд	Alexandrovsk Александровский уезд	Slavyanoserbsk Славяносербский уезд	Verkhnedneprovsk Верхнеднепровский уезд
Native language	Number	%	Number	Number	Number	Number	Number	Number	Number	Number
Total	2,113,674	100%	357,207	251,460	332,478	260,368	254,056	271,678	174,753	211,674
Great Russian (Russian)	364,974	17.27%	75,190	36,164	103,702	9,628	35,691	15,445	79,281	9,873
Little Russian (Ukrainian)	1,456,269	68.90%	198,982	200,434	193,510	242,737	117,206	224,122	88,218	191,160
White Russian (Belarusian)	14,052	0.66%	4,033	505	2,468	196	1,697	3,353	1,564	236
Polish	12,365	0.59%	7,933	553	2,000	316	528	293	511	231
German	80,979	3.83%	20,609	5,806	12,646	3,452	19,104	14,014	896	4,452
French	908	0.04%	197	8	451	50	46	18	122	16
Italian	146	0.01%	21	1	37	0	39	14	25	9
Romanian and Moldovan	9,175	0.43%	1,771	29	6,371	0	95	2	839	68
English	369	0.02%	14	1	284	0	41	2	13	14
Greek	48,740	2.31%	193	38	142	9	48,290	45	14	9
Jewish	99,152	4.69%	46,441	7,363	9,457	3,635	10,291	13,886	2,631	5,448
Tatar	17,253	0.82%	868	255	346	7	15,472	128	151	26
Turkish	5,555	0.26%	168	15	20	9	5,317	14	4	8
Roma (Gypsy)	1,293	0.06%	103	172	255	272	21	203	177	90
Other	1,888	0.09%	519	71	655	28	164	77	251	23
Unidentified	556	0.03%	165	45	134	29	54	62	56	11

== Religion ==
- By the Imperial census of 1897.

Religion	Number	percentage (%)	males	females	In the cities	Outside the cities
Eastern Orthodox	1,903,264	90.05%	982,616	920,648	167,263	1,736,001
Judaism	101,088	4.78%	51,679	49,409	64,024	37,064
Lutherans	39,530	1.87%	19,972	19,558	2,085	37,445
Roman Catholics	32,154	1.52%	17,658	14,496	5,388	26,766
Mennonites	23,922	1.13%	12,132	11,790	208	23,714
Old Believers and deviants from orthodoxy	9,393	0.44%	4,699	4,694	421	8,972
Muslims	2,090	0.10%	1,700	390	1,039	1,051
Baptists	1,150	0.05%	606	544	5	1,145
Armenian-Gregorian	448	0.02%	301	147	225	223
Karaites	359	0.02%	178	181	302	57
Reformed Christian	157	0.01%	95	62	15	142
Anglican	46	0.00%	26	20	16	30
Other	73	0.00%	53	20	14	43
Total	2,113,674	100%	1,091,715	1,021,959	241,005	1,872,669

== Governors ==
General-Governors

- 1823–1844 Mikhail Vorontsov

Governors

- 1802–1803 Sergei Bekleshov
- 1803–1809 Pyotr Berg
- 1809–1817 Kirill Gladkiy
- 1817–1820 Ivan Kalageorgiy
- 1820–1823 Viktor Shemiot
- 1823–1824 Trofim Tsalaban
- 1824–1828 Alexei Svyechin
- 1828–1831 Dmitriy Zakhorzhevskiy
- 1831–1832 Otto Frank
- 1832–1836 Nikanor Longinov
- 1836–1837 Dmitriy Safonov (vice-governor)

== Chairmen of the Governorate ==
Revkoms

- 26 October 1917 – ? Emmanuil Kviring
- November 1919 – 1920 Sergei Minin

Ispolkom

- February 1919 – 1920 Vasiliy Averin
- 1920 – 1921 Ivan Klymenko
- 1921 Stepan Vlasenko
- ? – 1923 Yakov Kuznetsov
- 1923 – 1924 Samokhvalov
- February 1925 – August 1925 Ivan Gavrilov

== Chekists ==
As an independent governmental organization

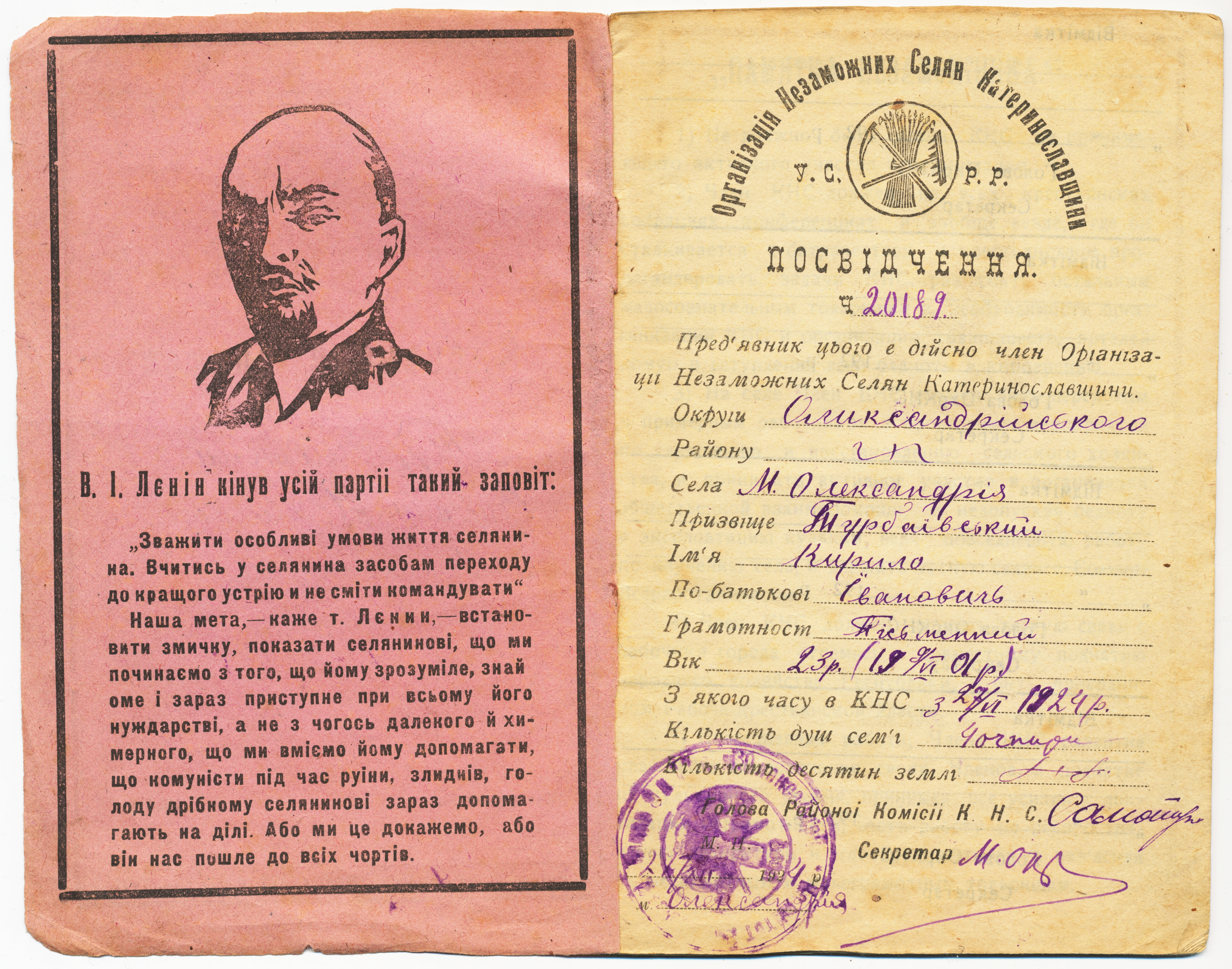
Membership ticket of Committees of Poor Peasants, Oleksandriia district, 1924 (for Kyrylo Ivanovych Turbaivskyi)

- 1919: Vasyl Valiavko (transferred to Volyn Cheka)
- 1919–1920: Aleksandr Alpov (transferred to Mykolaiv Cheka)

As part of the State Political Directorate (GPU)

- 24 May 1922 – 16 February 1923: Izrail Leplevskiy (transferred to Podolia Cheka)
- 1923: P. Onishchenko
- 1 September 1924 – 1 September 1925: Semyon Dukelsky

== Notable people ==
- Fedir Shchus, (Ukrainian: Федір Щусь, 25 March 1893 – 30 June 1921) also Fyodor Shuss or Feodosiy Shchus, was an Anarchist revolutionary, commander (ataman) in the Revolutionary Insurgent Army of Ukraine of Nestor Makhno.
- Viktor Bilash, (Ukrainian: Віктор Федорович Білаш; 1893 – 24 January 1938) was the Anarchist Chief of Staff of the Revolutionary Insurgent Army of Ukraine (RIAU) under Nestor Makhno.

== See also ==
- Yekaterinoslav Viceroyalty
- Governor's House (Dnipro)
