= Yekaterinoslav uezd =

Uyezd of Yekaterinoslav Governorate, Russian Empire

Yekaterinoslav uezd Екатеринославскій уѣздъ
- Uezd
- Coat of arms

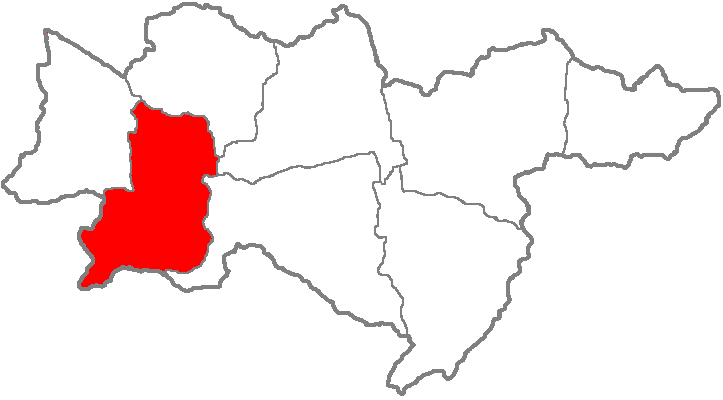
- Location in the Yekaterinoslav Governorate
- Country: Russian Empire
- Governorate: Yekaterinoslav
- Established: 1783
- Abolished: 1920
- Capital: Yekaterinoslav

Area
  - Total: 7,858.31 km^{2} (3,034.11 sq mi)

Population (1897)
  - Total: 357,207
  - Density: 45.4560/km^{2} (117.730/sq mi)

The Yekaterinoslav uezd (Note: Pre-1918 Russian: Екатеринославскій уѣздъ) (Russian: Екатеринославский уезд, romanized: Yekaterinoslavsky uyezd; Ukrainian: Катеринославський повіт, romanized: Katerynoslavskyi povit) was one of the subdivisions of the Yekaterinoslav Governorate of the Russian Empire. It was situated in the western part of the governorate. Its administrative centre was Yekaterinoslav (present-day Dnipro).

== Demographics ==
At the time of the Russian Empire Census of 1897, Yekaterinoslavsky Uyezd had a population of 357,207. Of these, 55.7% spoke Ukrainian, 21.0% Russian, 13.0% Yiddish, 5.8% German, 2.2% Polish, 1.1% Belarusian, 0.5% Moldovan or Romanian, 0.2% Tatar, 0.1% Czech, 0.1% French and 0.1% Greek as their native language.
