= Bakhmut =

City in Donetsk Oblast, Ukraine

Bakhmut Бахмут
- City
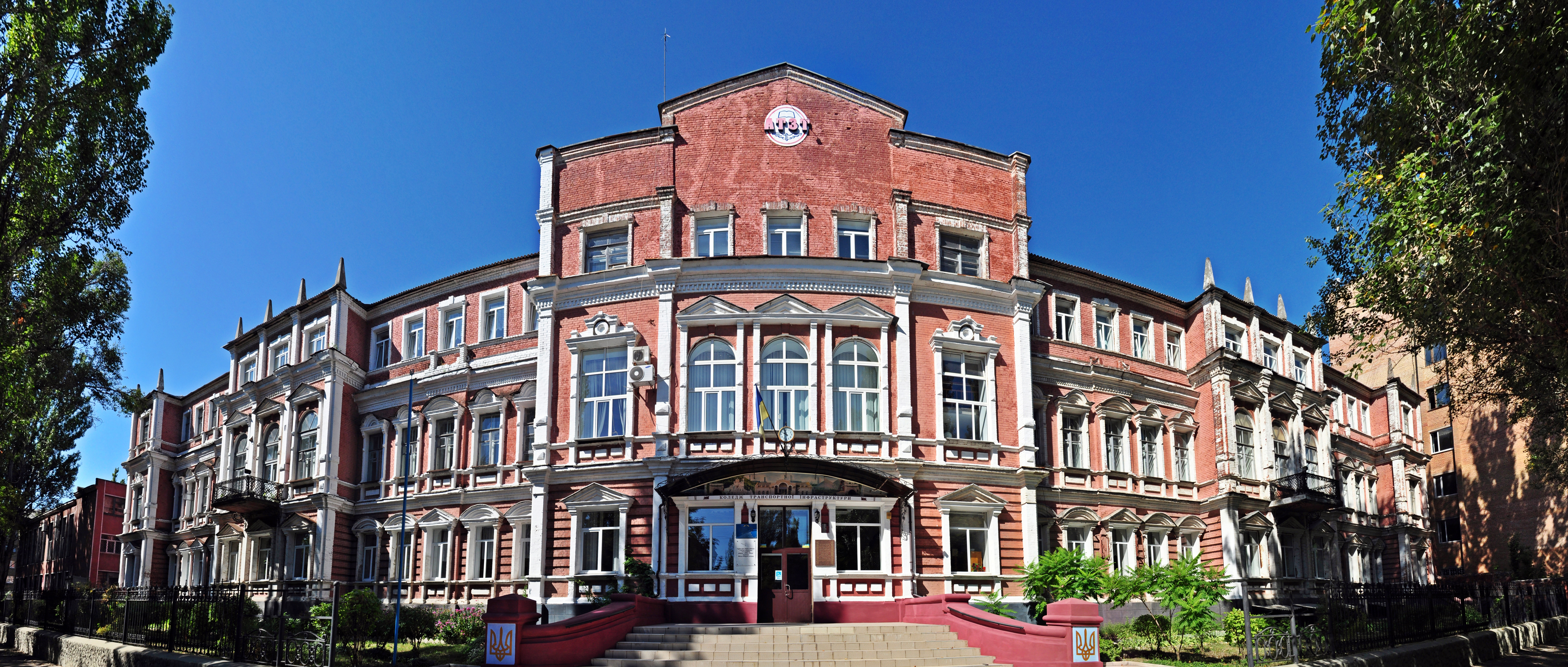
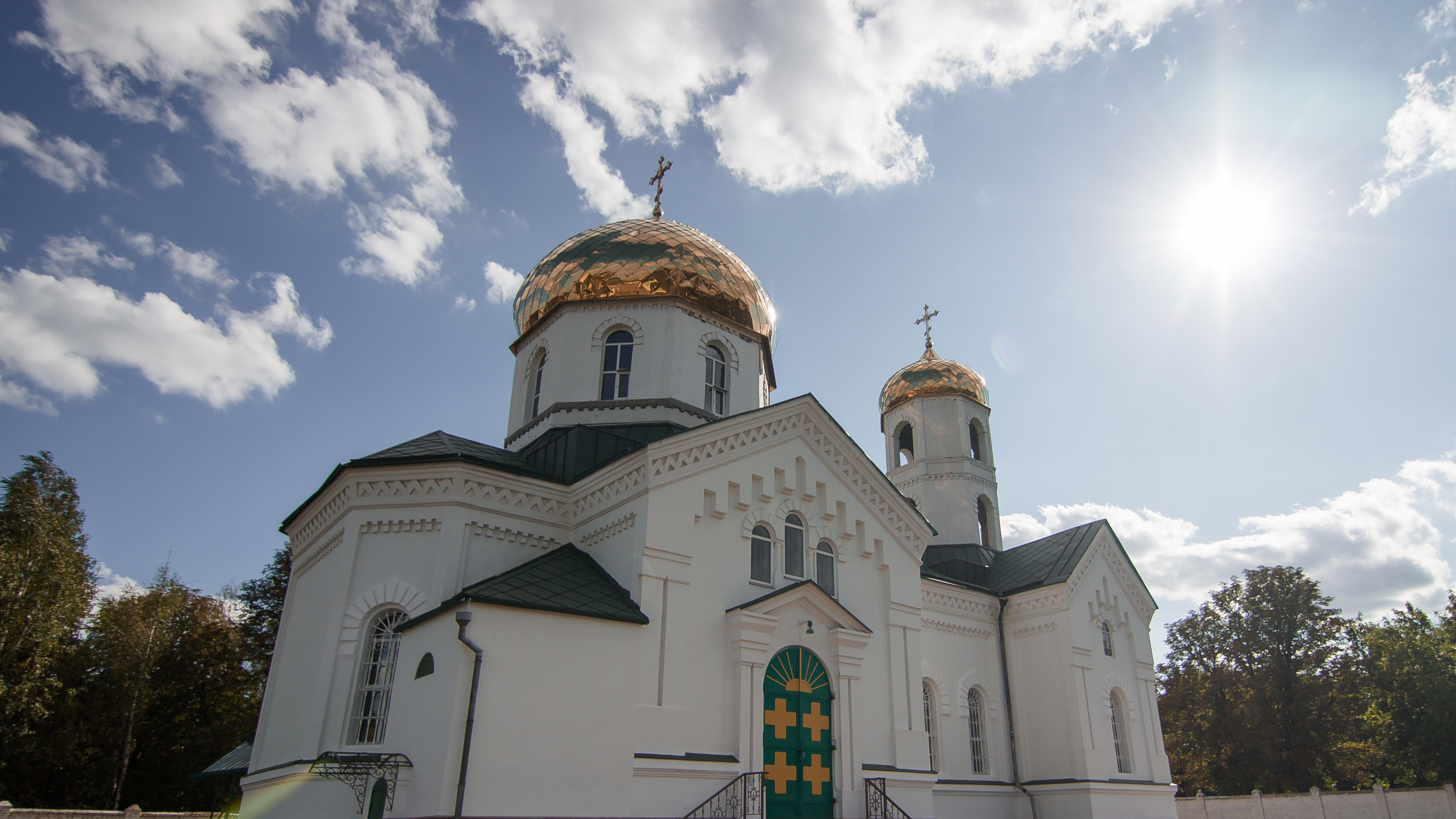
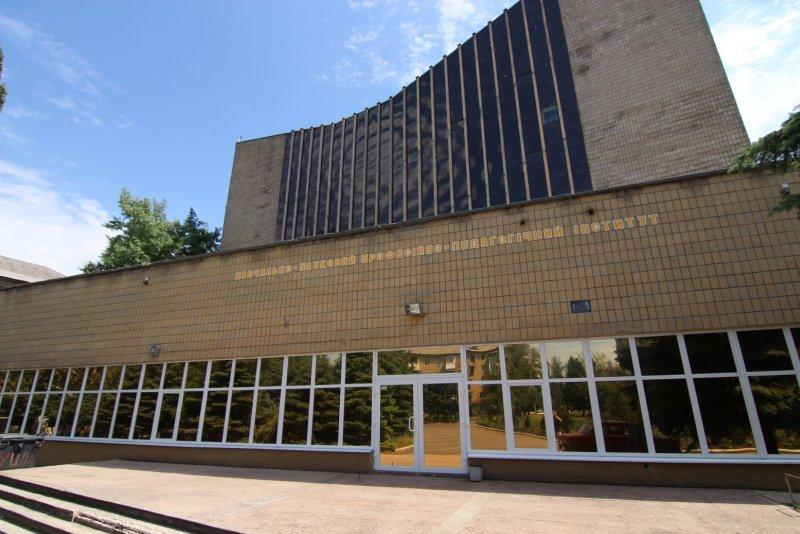

- Flag Coat of arms
- Interactive map of Bakhmut
- Location within Donetsk Oblast Location within Ukraine
- Coordinates: 48°35′41″N 38°0′3″E
- Country: Ukraine
- Oblast: Donetsk Oblast
- Raion: Bakhmut Raion
- Hromada: Bakhmut urban hromada
- First mentioned: 1571
- City status: 1783

Government
  - Mayor: Oleksiy Reva (since 1990)
- Area: 41.6 km^{2} (16.1 sq mi)
- Elevation: 200 m (660 ft)
- Population (2022): 71,094
  - Estimate (2023): > 500
  - Density: 1,710/km^{2} (4,430/sq mi)
- Demonym: Bakhmutian
- Climate: Dfb

Bakhmut (Note: See § Names for further details and etymology) is a city in eastern Ukraine. Officially the administrative center of Bakhmut urban hromada and Bakhmut Raion in Donetsk Oblast, it is on the Bakhmutka River, about 90 kilometres (55 miles) north of Donetsk, the administrative center of the oblast. Bakhmut was designated a city of regional significance until 2020, when the designation was abolished. In January 2022, it had an estimated population of 71,094.

Bakhmut was originally founded in the 16th century as a minor border post on the southern border of the Russian state. Its population grew in the early 18th century, and it served as the capital of Slavo-Serbia (1753–1764), a colony in the Russian Empire established by settlers from the Balkans.

It received city status in 1783, and underwent major industrialization over the following few centuries. In 1920–1924, the city was an administrative center of the newly created Donets Governorate of the Ukrainian SSR in the Soviet Union. The city was known as Artemivsk or Artemovsk between 1924 and 2016. During World War II, it was the site of the Artemivsk massacre of Soviet Jews by Nazi Germany.

During the beginning of the war in Donbas between the independent Ukrainian government and pro-Russian separatists, the city was the site of the battle of Artemivsk in 2014. During the full-scale Russian invasion of Ukraine which commenced in February 2022, Bakhmut was the site of a major battle between Russian and Ukrainian forces. The city was largely destroyed, with most of its population having fled, and what remained being placed under Russian occupation.

== Names ==
=== Current name (until 1924; 2016–present) ===
- Ukrainian: Бахмут, pronounced [bɐxˈmut] (Note: The pronunciation [ˈbɑxmʊt], with the emphasis on the first syllable, is also commonly used, especially by non-locals, but it is sometimes considered historically incorrect by some locals.)
- Russian: Бахмут, pronounced [bɐxˈmut]

The name derives from the Bakhmutka River, on which the city lies. The ultimate origin of the name Bakhmut is uncertain. According to a theory by Kharkiv historian Igor Rassokhaa, the word may derive from a Turkic word meaning 'salt water' or 'beach'. It may also be derived from bakhmát (бахмат), ultimately from Turkic paχn at, meaning "steppe horse". Another theory states that the name Bakhmut is based on Turkish or Tartar Mahmut, a variant of Muhammad.

=== Former name (1924–2016) ===
- Ukrainian: Артемівськ, romanized: Artemivs'k, pronounced [ɐrˈtɛmʲiu̯sʲk]
- Russian: Артёмовск, romanized: Artyomovsk, pronounced [ɐrˈtʲɵməfsk]

In 1924, the city was renamed Artemivsk in honour of Fyodor Sergeyev, who was pseudonymously known as "Comrade Artyom". On 23 September 2015, the city council decided to restore the name Bakhmut under the Decommunisation Laws, in which cities with communist-related names were required to be renamed. The Verkhovna Rada approved a bill of renaming to Bakhmut on 4 February 2016.

== History ==
=== Pre-founding ===
Near the city, archaeologists have discovered a Neolithic-era flint processing workshop, excavated ancient burial grounds from the Copper Age and Bronze Age, and discovered stone baba sculptures associated with nomads from the ninth-to-twelfth century.

=== Early history ===
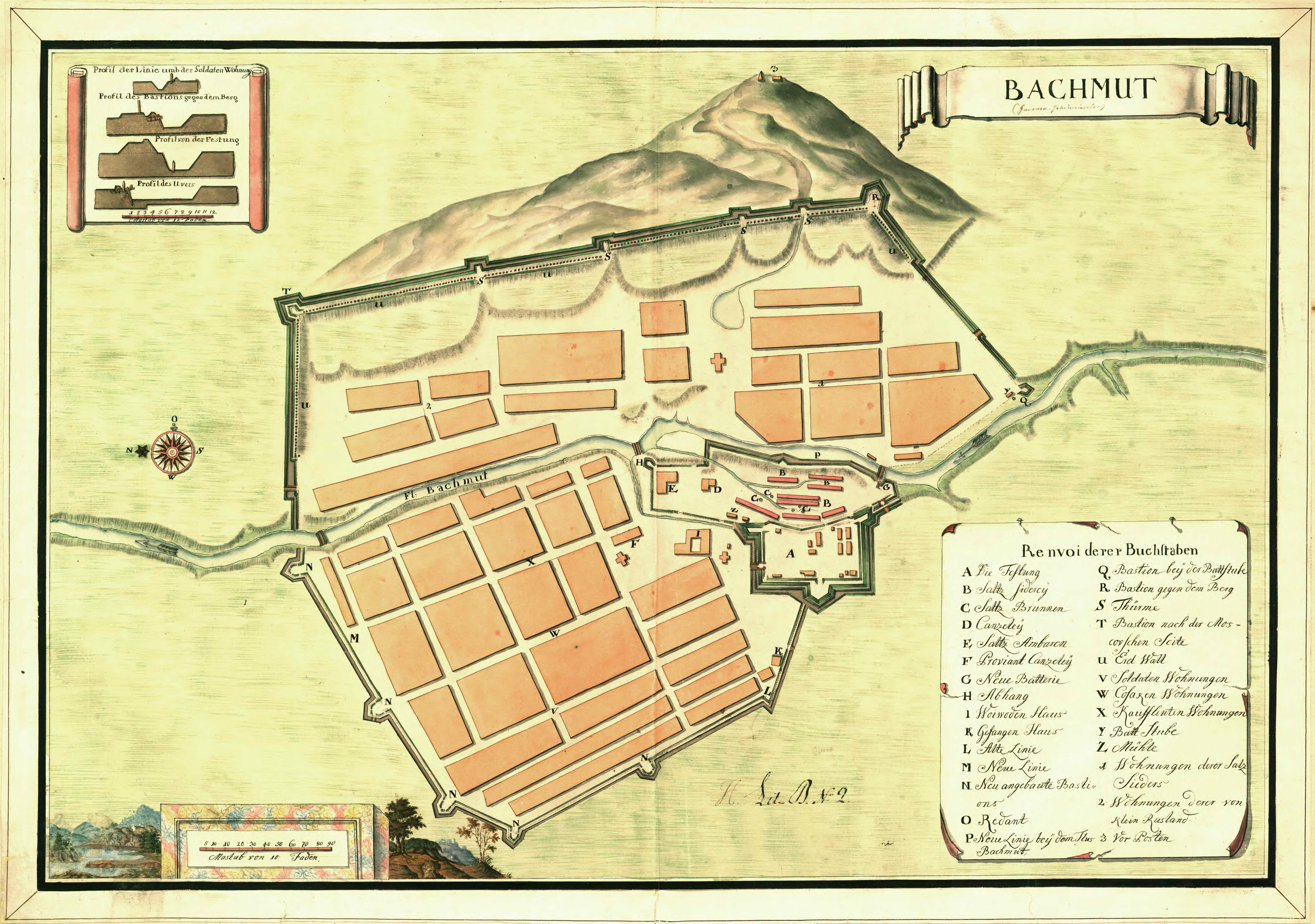
Historical map of Bakhmut and its fortifications

Although there is evidence of prior settlement in 1556, the first official mention of Bakhmut dates from 1571, when Ivan the Terrible, in order to protect the southern border of the Russian state from Crimean–Nogai slave raids, ordered the creation of border fortifications along the Aidar and Siverskyi Donets rivers. The settlement was described then as a guard-fort (storozha) named after the nearby Bakhmutka River, a tributary of the Siverskyi Donets, and located at the mouth of a stream called the Chornyi Zherebets.

The ultimate origin of the name Bakhmut is uncertain. According to a theory by Kharkiv historian Igor Rassokhaa, the word may derive from a Turkic/Tatar word meaning 'salt water' or 'beach'. The name dates back to 1571.

Bakhmut was initially a border post, and later became a fortified town. In 1701, Peter the Great ordered the fort at Bakhmut to be upgraded and the adjacent sloboda (free village) of Bakhmut be designated a city. The new fort was completed in 1703 and housed 170 people. In 1704, Peter commanded some Cossacks to settle at the Bakhmutka River and mine salt. The population of Bakhmut doubled, and the town was assigned to the Izium Regiment, a province of Sloboda Ukraine.

In the autumn of 1705, Bakhmut became one of the centers of the Bulavin Rebellion. A detachment of Don Cossacks headed by Ataman Kondraty Bulavin captured the Bakhmut salt mines and occupied the city until they were defeated and the city retaken by government troops. According to official Soviet sources, the government forces "brutally" suppressed the revolution and Bakhmut was completely destroyed.

From 1708 to 22 April 1725, Bakhmut was assigned to the first Azov Governorate. On 29 May 1719, it became the administrative center of Bakhmut Province within Azov Governorate. From 1753 until the colony's abolition, it was the administrative center of Slavo-Serbia, a short-lived territory that was settled by thousands of colonists from the Balkans, predominantly Serbs. Bakhmut was fortified, to serve the colony's purpose of frontier protection. In 1764, the Bakhmut hussar regiment was formed by merging two Serbian settler regiments, with its headquarters in Bakhmut. After the abolition of Slavo-Serbia, in 1765 Bakhmut was assigned to Novorossiya Governorate. In 1775, it became part of the second Azov Governorate.

In 1783, Bakhmut received city status, and was assigned to Yekaterinoslav Province of the re-established Novorossiysk Governorate. On 2 August 1811, a coat of arms of Bakhmut was approved, featuring symbolism evoking the salt reserves of the city. In 1863, a large synagogue was built in the city, as a place of worship for Bakhmut's Jewish community of 1,560 people. In 1875, a municipal water system was installed. In 1876, due to the work of Russian geologist Alexander Karpinsky, large deposits of rock salt were discovered near Bakhmut. Bakhmut soon produced 12.3% of the total output of salt in the Russian Empire.

=== Industrialization ===
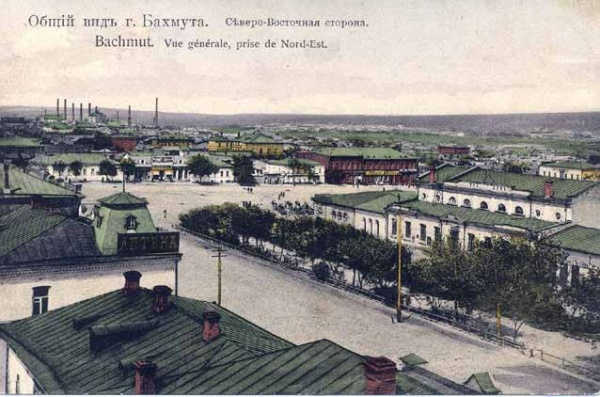
An early 20th-century postcard of Bakhmut

Bakhmut saw industrialization during the late 19th and early 20th centuries. In the early 1870s, German industrialist Edmund Farke built alabaster, brick and tile factories in the city. In 1878, the Kharkiv-Bakhmut-Popasna railroad was constructed.

Streets were paved in Bakhmut in 1900. At the beginning of the twentieth century, the city began to develop metal-working industry. By 1909, the city had 64 industrial enterprises, which employed 1,075 workers.

In 1905, after the release of the October Manifesto, an antisemitic pogrom took place in Bakhmut, killing and wounding several Jewish residents of the city. In April 1918, after the collapse of the Russian Empire, troops loyal to the Ukrainian People's Republic took control of Bakhmut. Later, it was captured by White movement soldiers led by Pyotr Krasnov, who were eventually defeated by Soviet forces.

From 1920 to 1925, Bakhmut was the administrative center of the newly created Donets Governorate of the Ukrainian SSR. In 1923, there were many enterprises in Bakhmut, including the "Victory of Labor" factory that made nails and spikes, the "Blyskavka" ("Lightning") factory that produced agriculture tools, as well as brick, tile, and alabaster factories, and a shoe factory. In 1922, to help rebuild the salt industry, a state salt mining company was created, which is now Artemsil. In 1925, the salt mining areas were split off from Bakhmut into their own urban-type settlement named Karlo-Libknekhtivsk (now Soledar).

In 1924, the city's name was changed from Bakhmut to Artemivsk, in honour of the Bolshevik leader Fyodor Sergeyev, who was known as Comrade Artem (or Artyom). The city's synagogue was shuttered in 1928. 3,255 residents of Artemivsk died as a result of the Holodomor. During Stalin's Great Purge in the late 1930s, more than 500 residents of Artemivsk were victims of the repressions.

=== World War II and later 20th century ===
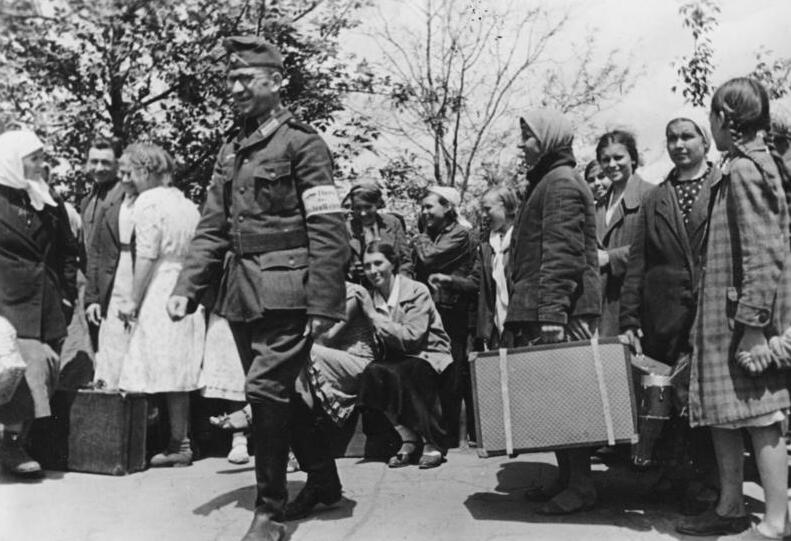
Civilians in Artemivsk reporting to the Nazi occupation offices for forced labor, May 1942

During the Second World War, at the beginning of the Nazi invasion of the Soviet Union in 1941, Artemivsk's population included 5,300 Jews, making up almost 10% of the total population. The majority of these were either drafted into the Red Army or evacuated into the interior areas of the Soviet Union.

On 31 October 1941, (Note: The starting date is sometimes also given as 1 November 1941.) Nazi German troops began their occupation of Artemivsk. On 19 November, the occupation authorities issued a decree forcing the remaining local Jews to register at the local commandant's office and wear armbands marking them as Jewish. On 9 January 1942, under the pretext of needing to gather in one place for relocation, Artemivsk's Jewish population was gathered in the city park, where they were forced to hand over all their valuable possessions, then were locked in the cellar of a former NKVD building. They were locked in the "freezing" cellar for three days without food or water. During this period, according to Haaretz, local residents threw lumps of snow through the windows in an attempt to provide some sort of drinkable water to the imprisoned Jews. A few residents risked their lives to rescue some Jewish children, a feat for which they would later receive the title of Righteous Among the Nations from Israel.

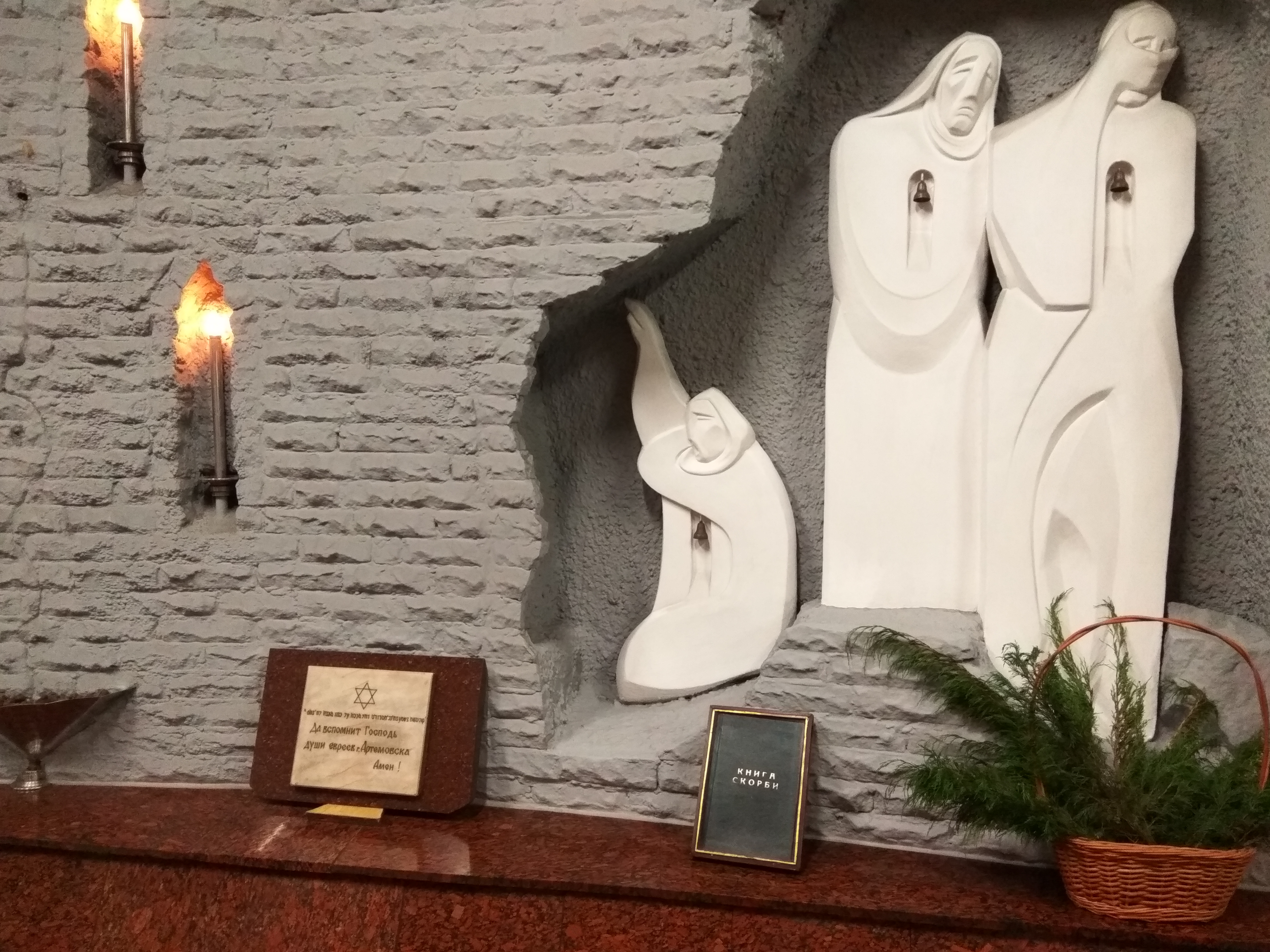
The "Wailing Wall" memorial to the murdered Jews of the city

The Artemivsk massacre took place on 11–12 January 1942, when Sonderkommando 4b of Einsatzgruppe C led thousands of Jews into a mineshaft in an alabaster mine, where they shot into the crowd, killing several people. The soldiers then bricked up the entrance to the tunnel, suffocating the remaining people trapped inside. The exact number of dead is unclear, and records of the Jewish death toll differ: Soviet documents reported a number of about 3,000, while the German occupation authorities recorded 1,200 victims. The city was eventually liberated by the Red Army on 5 September 1943.

In 1990, Oleksiy Reva became mayor of Bakhmut during the last years of the Soviet period. In the 1991 Ukrainian independence referendum, the overwhelming majority of Bakhmut residents voted for independence from the Soviet Union. In January 1999, a charitable Jewish foundation in the city, as well as the Artemivsk city council and a winery that had opened on the site in 1952, inaugurated a memorial to commemorate the victims of the 1942 mass murder. The memorial was built into a rock face in the old mine where water collects and was named the "Wailing Wall" for the murdered Jews of the city.

=== Russo-Ukrainian War ===
==== War in Donbas ====
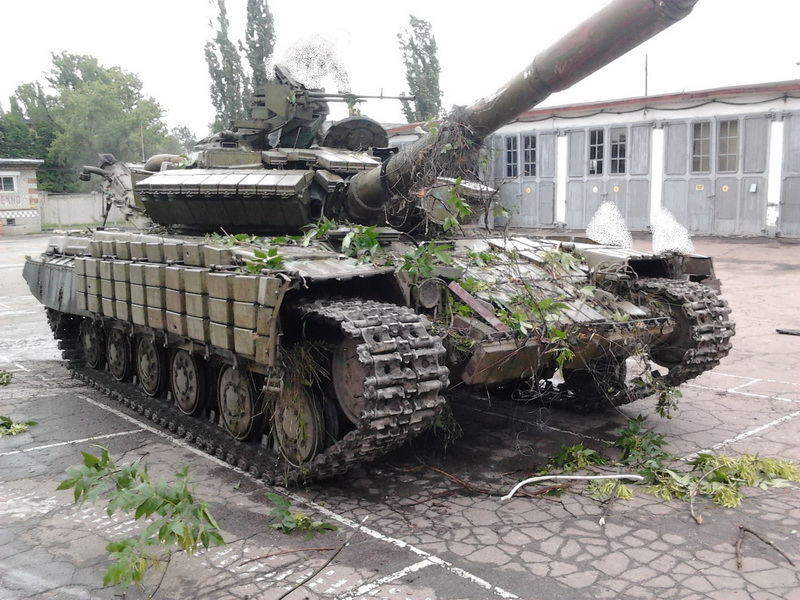
A Russian T-64BV, captured after the rebel retreat from Artemivsk

In April 2014, at the beginning of the war in Donbas, pro-Russian rebels led by Igor Bezler and belonging to the Donetsk People's Republic claimed the city of Artemivsk as part of their territory. As the rebels entered the city, mayor Oleksiy Reva temporarily fled the city. Local military units defended the city for months, repelling separatist assaults over the course of the Battle of Artemivsk. Ukrainian government forces fully recaptured the city on 7 July 2014, ending the battle.

On 15 May 2015, Ukrainian president Petro Poroshenko signed a bill into law that started a six-month period for the removal of communist monuments and the mandatory renaming of settlements with names related to communism. On 23 September 2015, the city council voted to restore the city's former name of Bakhmut. The final decision was made by the Verkhovna Rada on 4 February 2016, and the city returned to its original name. The Russian government, as well as Russian state media, have continued to refer to the town as Artyomovsk, especially in military contexts.

==== Russian invasion ====
During the Russian invasion of Ukraine, Bakhmut became a frontline city in May, and was regularly shelled by Russian forces. In May 2022, according to local authorities, an estimated 20,000 people remained in the city. It became a major battle of the war, attracting worldwide attention due to the level of destruction in the city and the numbers of casualties on both sides.

According to the Associated Press in October 2022, "taking Bakhmut would rupture Ukraine's supply lines and open a route for Russian forces to press on toward Kramatorsk and Sloviansk, key Ukrainian strongholds in Donetsk province". In a December analysis of the offensive, however, the UK Ministry of Defence said "the capture of the town would have limited operational value although it would potentially allow Russia to threaten the larger urban areas of Kramatorsk and Sloviansk". On 11 December 2022, Ukrainian president Volodymyr Zelenskyy said that Russian forces had turned the city into "burned ruins".

By early March 2023, Russian forces had not taken Bakhmut, but were continuing to press the attack, and hoped to complete their encirclement of the city. On 4 March, the deputy mayor of the city said that 4,000 civilians remained in Bakhmut and were living in shelters with no access to water, gas or electricity. On 20 May, Russia claimed to have fully taken Bakhmut; however, Ukraine has denied this. At the G7 summit, Zelenskyy stated that the images of the ruined Hiroshima after atomic bombing reminded him of the level of destruction in Bakhmut. The battle was still ongoing with Ukraine claiming to still control a strip of territory within city limits along the T0504 highway, as well as performing attacks on the flanks of the city. By May 24, reports that corroborated the claimed seizure of the city by Russian and Wagner forces had surfaced. By 25 May, Wagner had begun withdrawing from the city to be replaced by regular Russian troops. On June 4, Yevgeny Prigozhin conceded that Ukrainian forces still controlled parts of the city along the T0504 highway.

On 4 June 2023, the Ukrainian summer counteroffensive began and the Bakhmut sector was one of its three main axes. However, only small amounts of territory were recaptured, most notably Andriivka on 15 September and Klishchiivka around 17 September. By 29 November 2023, after the counteroffensive had stalled, Russian forces had regained the initiative and captured Khromove on the western outskirts of Bakhmut. They had also recaptured considerable portions of territory south of the Berkhivka Reservoir that they previously lost in May. Bakhmut was the largest Ukrainian city to switch hands in 2023 and the battle greatly contributed to Russia's net gain of territory during the year.

== Geography ==
=== Climate ===
Bakhmut has a humid continental climate (Dfb bordering on Dfa).

Climate data for Bakhmut (1981–2010)
Month	Jan	Feb	Mar	Apr	May	Jun	Jul	Aug	Sep	Oct	Nov	Dec	Year
Mean daily maximum °C (°F)	−0.9 (30.4)	0.2 (32.4)	6.2 (43.2)	15.7 (60.3)	22.3 (72.1)	26.3 (79.3)	28.5 (83.3)	28.2 (82.8)	21.8 (71.2)	13.9 (57.0)	5.2 (41.4)	0.1 (32.2)	14.0 (57.2)
Daily mean °C (°F)	−4.0 (24.8)	−3.9 (25.0)	1.7 (35.1)	9.6 (49.3)	15.6 (60.1)	19.7 (67.5)	21.8 (71.2)	20.8 (69.4)	14.9 (58.8)	8.4 (47.1)	1.8 (35.2)	−2.7 (27.1)	8.6 (47.5)
Mean daily minimum °C (°F)	−6.9 (19.6)	−7.4 (18.7)	−2.4 (27.7)	3.9 (39.0)	8.8 (47.8)	13.1 (55.6)	15.1 (59.2)	13.6 (56.5)	8.8 (47.8)	3.7 (38.7)	−1.4 (29.5)	−5.6 (21.9)	3.6 (38.5)
Average precipitation mm (inches)	44.9 (1.77)	38.8 (1.53)	37.1 (1.46)	39.7 (1.56)	44.7 (1.76)	64.1 (2.52)	57.6 (2.27)	37.1 (1.46)	48.0 (1.89)	39.3 (1.55)	43.7 (1.72)	46.4 (1.83)	541.4 (21.31)
Average precipitation days (≥ 1.0 mm)	9.0	7.8	8.3	7.0	7.0	8.7	7.0	4.6	6.8	5.4	7.5	8.9	88.0
Average relative humidity (%)	82.2	80.5	76.4	66.2	63.0	66.0	65.0	62.8	69.2	76.1	83.7	84.0	72.9
Source: NOAA

== Demographics ==
Historical population
Year	Pop.	±% p.a.
1703	170	—
1825	4,215	+2.67%
1857	9,197	+2.47%
1897	19,316	+1.87%
1923	28,904	+1.56%
1926	37,354	+8.92%
1939	55,409	+3.08%
1943	25,000	−18.04%
1959	60,626	+5.69%
1970	82,342	+2.82%
1979	87,084	+0.62%
1989	90,279	+0.36%
1992	91,000	+0.27%
1998	86,800	−0.78%
2001	82,816	−1.55%
2003	82,014	−0.49%
2004	81,426	−0.72%
2005	80,655	−0.95%
2006	80,227	−0.53%
2007	79,950	−0.35%
2008	79,591	−0.45%
2009	79,309	−0.35%
2010	78,849	−0.58%
2011	78,251	−0.76%
2012	77,952	−0.38%
2013	77,620	−0.43%
2014	77,404	−0.28%
2015	77,117	−0.37%
2016	76,599	−0.67%
2017	75,798	−1.05%
2018	74,878	−1.21%
2019	74,702	−0.24%
2020	73,212	−1.99%
2021	72,310	−1.23%
2022	71,094	−1.68%
2023 (March)	4,000	−94.37%
2023 (May)	500	−100.00%

Bakhmut's population has continuously declined in recent years, with the death rate (535) significantly higher than the birth rate (187) in 2017. In January 2022 (the last estimate of the city's population before the Russian invasion of Ukraine), the estimated population of Bakhmut was 75,900.

The majority of Bakhmut's residents are ethnic Ukrainians (69.4%), with a large minority of ethnic Russians (27.5%). Many of the latter group are descendants of migrants who arrived in Bakhmut during industrialization efforts in the Soviet era, between the later 1920s and the 1940s. There are also small minorities of ethnic Belarusians (0.6%), Armenians (0.3%), Romani people (0.2%), and Jews (0.2%).

The most spoken native language is Russian (62%), with a large minority speaking Ukrainian (35%), and very small minorities speaking Armenian (0.19%), Romani (0.15%), and Belarusian (0.10%). The Russian speech of many residents has characteristics of surzhyk, a kind of mixed Ukrainian and Russian speech common in eastern Ukraine.

Historically, Bakhmut was a more Ukrainian-speaking city. In 1897, most residents of Bakhmut spoke Ukrainian (61.8%), while minorities spoke Russian (18.9%) and Yiddish (16.7%).

== Government and politics ==
Bakhmut's political leaning and sense of identity has historically been mixed. In the 1991 Ukrainian independence referendum, the overwhelming majority of Bakhmut residents voted for independence from the Soviet Union. In the 2010 Ukrainian presidential election, most voters in Bakhmut and surrounding areas voted for Russia-leaning Viktor Yanukovych and his party the Party of Regions. However, Christopher Miller, visiting the city in 2010, reported that "few seemed enthusiastic about having [voted for Yanukovych] and openly acknowledged that they believed he was corrupt. His party was seen by many as the least bad option." He said that most residents of the city considered themselves "people of the Donbas" first and foremost, and that while they valued autonomy, separatist sentiments were extremely rare.

Oleksiy Reva, who became mayor of Bakhmut in 1990 during the last years of the Soviet period, has become the longest-running mayor of any city in Ukraine. Ukrainian media, describing Reva, said "He survived the collapse of the empire, two revolutions and six presidents." He has "only once" been accused of corruption. He has been criticized for his conduct during the 2014 battle of Artemivsk during which he fled the city, but in September 2019, when he held a city council session in the Ukrainian language for the first time, it was considered a "historic event" for Bakhmut.

Bakhmut is the administrative center of Bakhmut urban hromada, one of the hromadas of Ukraine. In addition to Bakhmut, the hromada also contains the nearby town Krasna Hora and numerous small surrounding villages.

== Economy ==
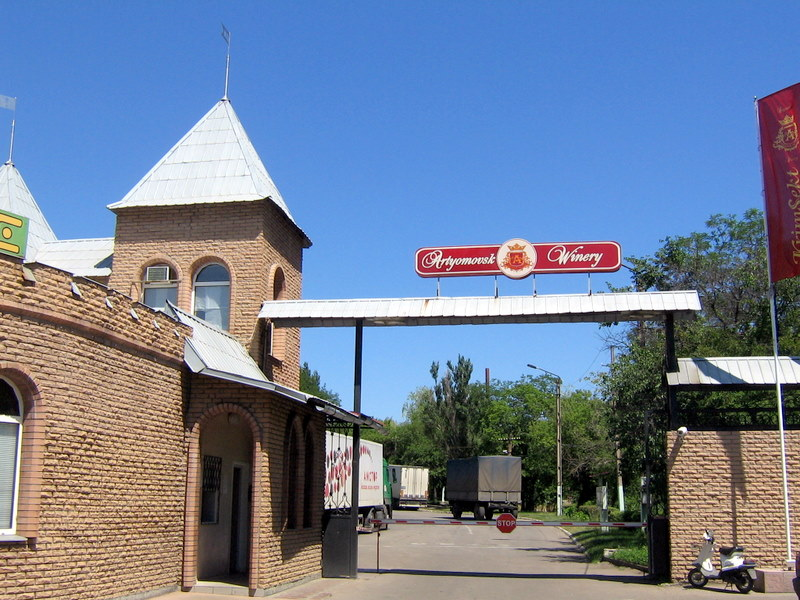
Artwinery in 2008, its sign showing its old name of "Artemovsk Winery"

Since 1950, the winery Artwinery (or Artvaineri, formerly Artemovsk Winery) has operated in the city. Its production was disrupted by the Russian annexation of Crimea, as it used to procure 70% of its grapes from Crimea.

The Artemsil salt mine is located in the suburb of Soledar. The chambers in the mine are large enough that a hot air balloon has been floated inside, and classical music concerts have been played.

=== Transport ===
The highway between Kharkiv and Rostov-on-Don passes near the city.

== Education ==
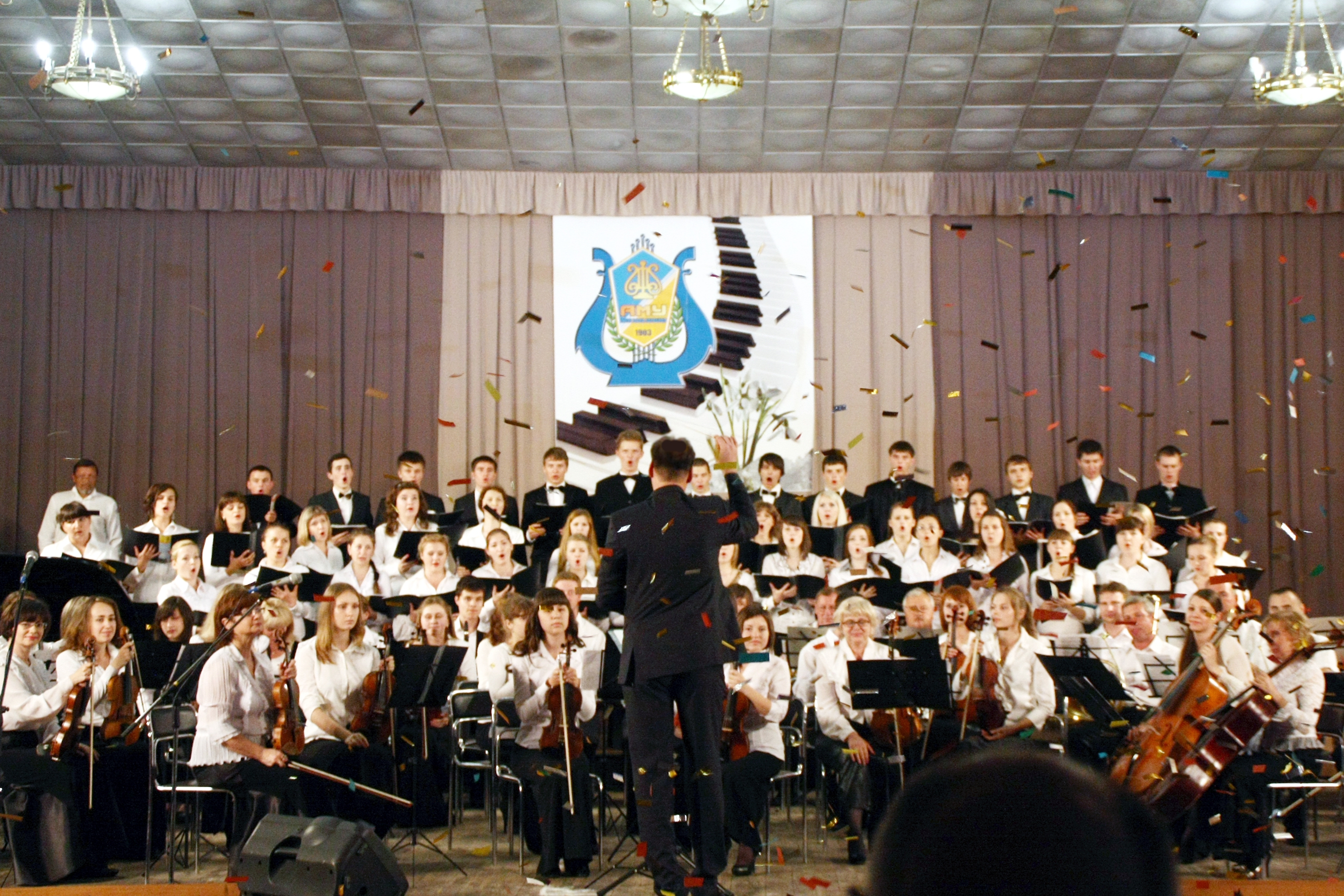
Symphony Orchestra and Choir of the Ivan Karabyts Bakhmut College of Arts

The city contains an institute of the salt industry, several technical colleges, medical schools, music schools, and teacher-training colleges. Among others, there is the Ivan Karabyts Bakhmut College of Arts (named after composer Ivan Karabyts) and the Bakhmut Pedagogical College.

There are twelve libraries, including one for blind people.

After the outbreak of the war in Donbas in 2014 the Horlivka Institute for Foreign Languages was evacuated and is now operating in Bakhmut.

== Media ==
The mass media in Bakhmut includes Russian-language newspapers such as Sobytiia and Vpered, as well as local television and radio channels. There is also an internet publication, bahmut.in.ua.

== Sports ==
The Metalurh Stadium, a football stadium constructed in 1949, is located within the city and has a seating capacity of 4,800. The stadium was damaged during the Russian invasion.

== Notable people ==
- Oleksandr Kovalenko (1976-2010), Ukrainian football player and referee
- Yuliya Levchenko (born 1997), Ukrainian high jumper
- Oleksiy Reva (born 1953), Ukrainian politician, who serves as the city's mayor since 1991
- Larisa Shepitko (1938–1979), Soviet film director of Ukrainian ethnicity
- Daniil Vashchenko (born 2005), Ukrainian football player
- Pavlo Vigderhaus (1925–2013), Soviet-Ukrainian architect
- Menachem Savidor (1917–1988), Israeli civil servant and politician, Speaker of the Knesset between 1981 and 1984

== Bibliography ==
- Kostić, Mita [in Serbian] (2001). "Nova Srbija i Slavenosrbija" (PDF) (in Serbo-Croatian). Novi Sad. Archived from the original (PDF) on 6 March 2009.
