= Artemivsk massacre =

1942 massacre of Jews in Artemivsk, Ukraine, Soviet Union (now Bakhmut, Ukraine)

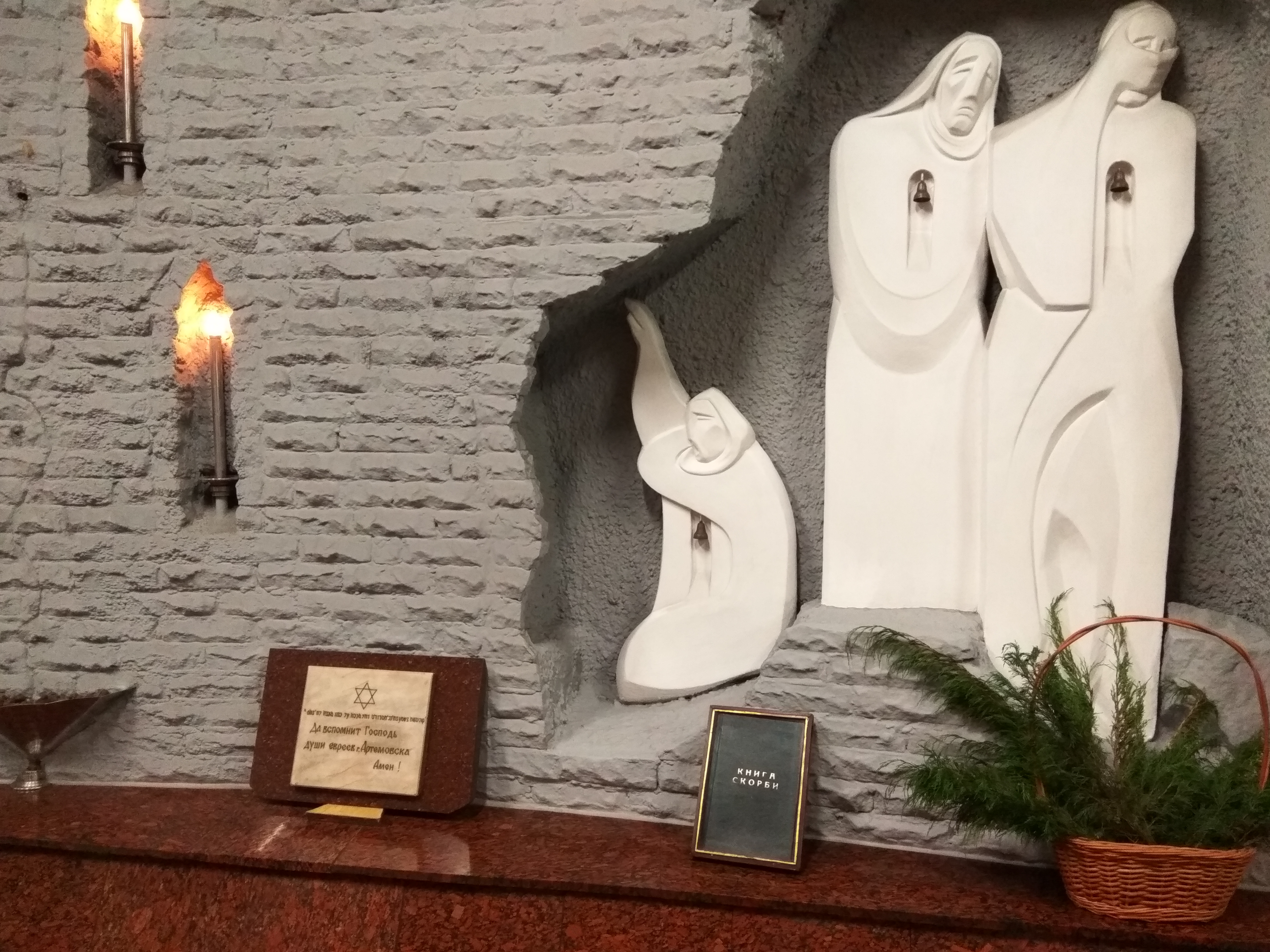
- The "wailing wall" memorial to victims of the Artemivsk massacre (photographed 2019)

- Location of Artemivsk (Bakhmut) within Ukraine
- Also known as: Artemovsk massacre, Bakhmut's Babi Yar
- Location: Artemivsk, Ukrainian Soviet Socialist Republic, Soviet Union (now Bakhmut, Ukraine); 48°35′41″N 38°0′3″E
- Date: 11 January 1942
- Perpetrators: Einsatzgruppe C, Sonderkommando 4b
- Victims: 1,317–3,000

The Artemivsk massacre, also referred to as "Bakhmut's Babi Yar", was a 1942 massacre of the Jewish inhabitants of the city of Artemivsk, in the Ukrainian Soviet Socialist Republic of the Soviet Union (now Bakhmut, Ukraine). Somewhere between 1,200 (according to German reports) and 3,000 (according to Soviet numbers) Jews were killed or left to die within the city's alabaster mines.

== Background and massacre ==
In 1939, the city of Artemivsk (now Bakhmut) had a Jewish population of 5,299, comprising 10% of the city's total population. Following the beginning of Operation Barbarossa, many of Artemivsk's Jews fled eastwards to escape the German offensive. Between 31 October and 1 November 1941, German forces took the city, and subsequently began to issue edicts restricting the Jewish population, such as an order on 19 November 1941 requiring Jews to wear armbands indicating their Jewish ancestry.

Due to its proximity to the front, the 17th Army ordered the killing of the city's Jews to be suspended for the time being.

On January 7, 1942, the town commander, Major Heinz Tsobel, issued an announcement to the Jewish inhabitants of Artemivsk, written on the instructions of the Sicherheitsdienst of the Reichsführer SS (SD) and signed by the collaborationist Mayor Holovnia:

1. In order to make them live separately, all Jews of Bakhmut, men and women of all ages, are to meet at 8 am on 9 January in the former NKVD station premises in the park.
2. Each person is allowed to bring with them 10 kg of luggage and 8 days of food reserves.
3. At the aforementioned meeting place, keys to apartments must be handed over with the name and address (street, house number) of the owner. Entering empty Jewish apartments or seizing objects from civilians is considered theft and is punishable by death.
4. Opposition to this order, especially delaying one's appearance or absence from the designated meeting place, shall be punished severely.
5. Employed Jews must quit.

Following the convocation of Artemivsk's Jewish population on 9 January 1942, they were herded onto trucks and transported to the abandoned alabaster mines within the city on 11 January 1942. After the Jews were taken into the mines, shots were fired, and the mine was sealed, leaving those who had not been killed by gunfire to suffocate.

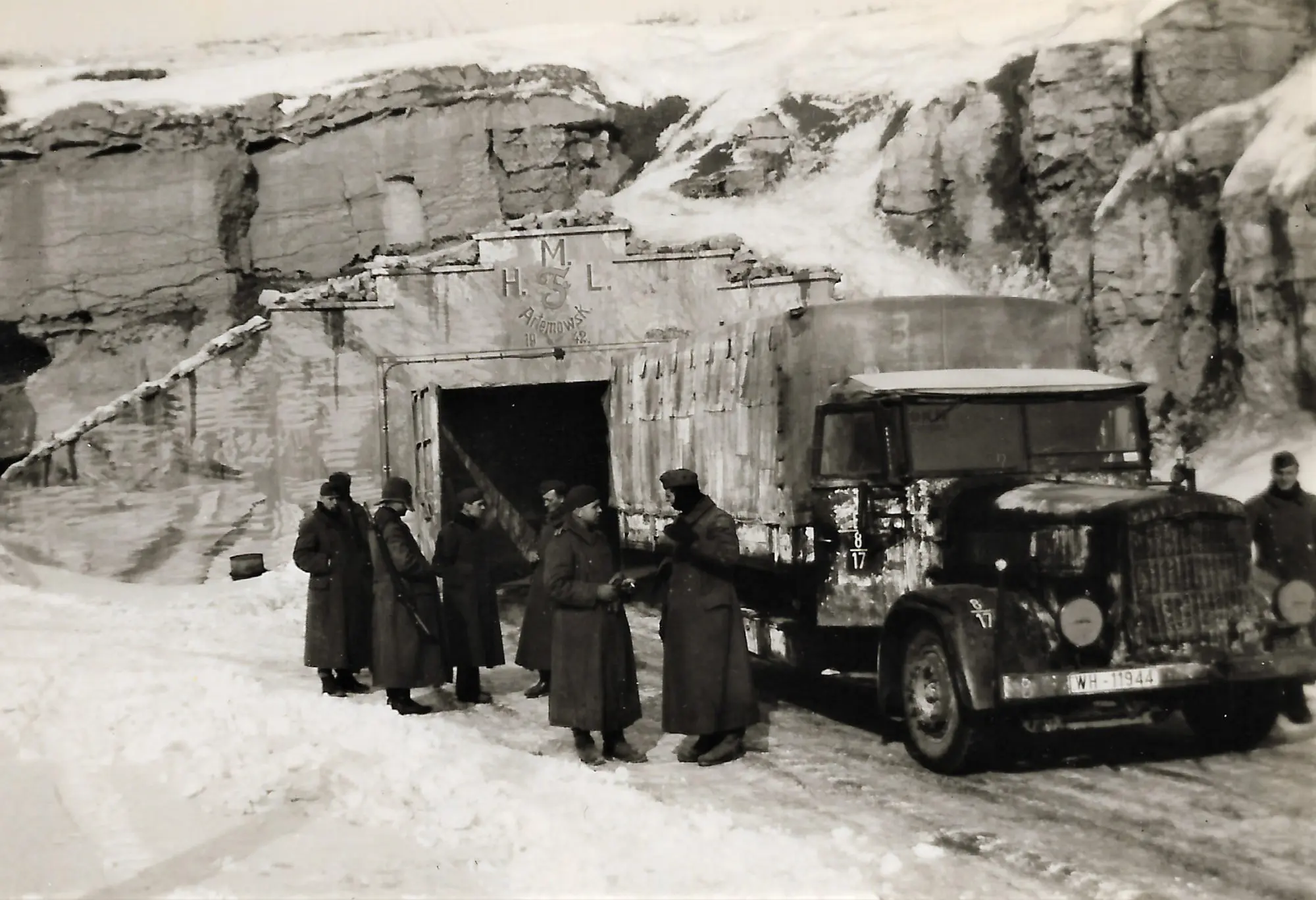
German soldiers in front of the Alabaster Mine in January 1942

The Extraordinary State Commission for the Determination of Atrocities committed by the Nazi occupiers described the massacre in its inspection report as follows: "As the cave filled with people, they were shot standing or kneeling, another group was driven in and killed in a heap of corpses and dying people, with the bodies of the dead piled up in several rows. The commission assumes that the dead included wounded who had been buried alive in the cave by the Nazi occupiers."

A great help in rounding up the Jews of Artemovsk were the local administrative authorities, who had supplied lists of registered Jews directly to the SD. But ordinary Ukrainians also denounced their Jewish neighbors.

According to German and Romanian reports following the incident, 1,317 people were killed, of whom 1,224 were Jews.

== Aftermath ==
Immediately after the massacre, Bakhmut Raion was declared to be judenfrei; that is, all Jews in the area had been killed. In September 1943, the city was recaptured by Soviet forces, and the mines were exhumed. Soviet documentation estimated around 3,000 killed, of whom only a dozen were identifiable. The massacre was mentioned in the Nuremberg trials, though it placed the date as between February and March 1942.

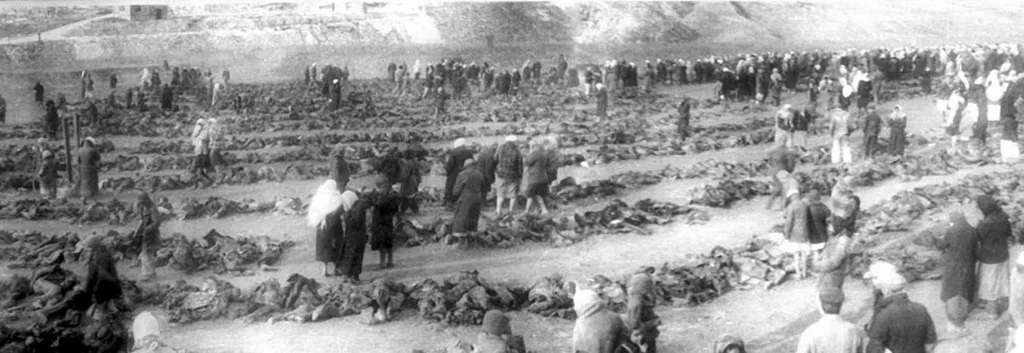
Massacres of Artemivsk 1942: Residents of Artemivsk are trying to identify the remains of their relatives and friends

In September 1943, Soviet troops recaptured the town and the walled-up tunnel was reopened and inspected on October 3, 1943. In its inspection report, the Extraordinary State Commission for the Investigation of Atrocities committed by the Nazi occupiers described the discovery of bodies as follows:

"Two kilometers east of the city of Artemovsk, 400 meters from the entrance, there is a small walled-up hole in the tunnel of the alabaster quarries. After opening this hole, the continuation of the tunnel was found in the form of a narrow, steeply rising corridor that ends in a wide, oval cave up to 20 meters long, 30 meters wide and 3 to 4 meters high. The entire cave is filled with human corpses; only a small space at the entrance and a narrow strip in the middle of the cave are free of corpses. All the corpses are pressed close together with their backs to the cave entrance. The corpses lie so close together that at first glance they look like a solid mass of intertwined bodies. The back rows are piled on top of the front rows, pressed against the steps of the cave and stacked in several rows, frozen in a standing or kneeling position of the crowd.

All the corpses are dressed in winter clothes, coats and other outer clothing are buttoned up, and the heads and necks of most of them are wrapped. Most of the corpses have white bandages on the front sleeves of their coats with "Stars of David" embroidered or drawn on them. Some of the corpses wear colorful and brightly colored clothing, as is usually worn by gypsies. The bodies of women and children of various ages predominate. There are also bodies of disabled people with crutches and canes.

In addition, suitcases, gas mask bags and bundles with household items and a small amount of supplies were found in the cave."

Due to the size of the cave and the arrangement of the bodies in two to three layers, the commission came to the conclusion that there were around 3,000 bodies in the cave."

Prisoners of war and those suspected of collaboration had to transport the bodies from the tunnel to the site of the nearby Artemovsk pipe factory, where they were laid out in several rows in the open for four days for identification by the population.

The Soviet authorities then organized a rally, at which, according to eyewitnesses, a priest held a memorial service contrary to the rules in force at the time and the dead were buried near the company. Later, the dead were reburied in a mass grave at the Mariupol city cemetery.

Following the war, the Artemivsk Champagne Factory was built over the mines.

== Memorial ==
In 1989, Mark Levovich Goldstein, who survived thanks to his timely evacuation, erected a private and simple memorial at his own expense in the Mariupol city cemetery near the entrance, commemorating his family and all the other victims with a Star of David and the inscription "For the survivors of the survivors. MG"

In 1999, following efforts by the city's Jewish community and support from the factory's director, a monument was established at the site of the massacre, known as the Wall of Sorrow. The memorial, also referred to as the "Wailing Wall" after the Western Wall in Jerusalem, is part of the State Register of Immovable Landmarks of Ukraine, numbered 14-103-0025. It may have been destroyed by Russian shelling in the Battle of Bakhmut during the Russian invasion of Ukraine, according to one leader of Bakhmut's local Jewish community.

== See also ==
- The Holocaust in Ukraine
- Babi Yar
- Ukrainian cultural heritage during the 2022 Russian invasion
