= Soledar =

City in Donetsk Oblast, Ukraine

Soledar Соледар
- City
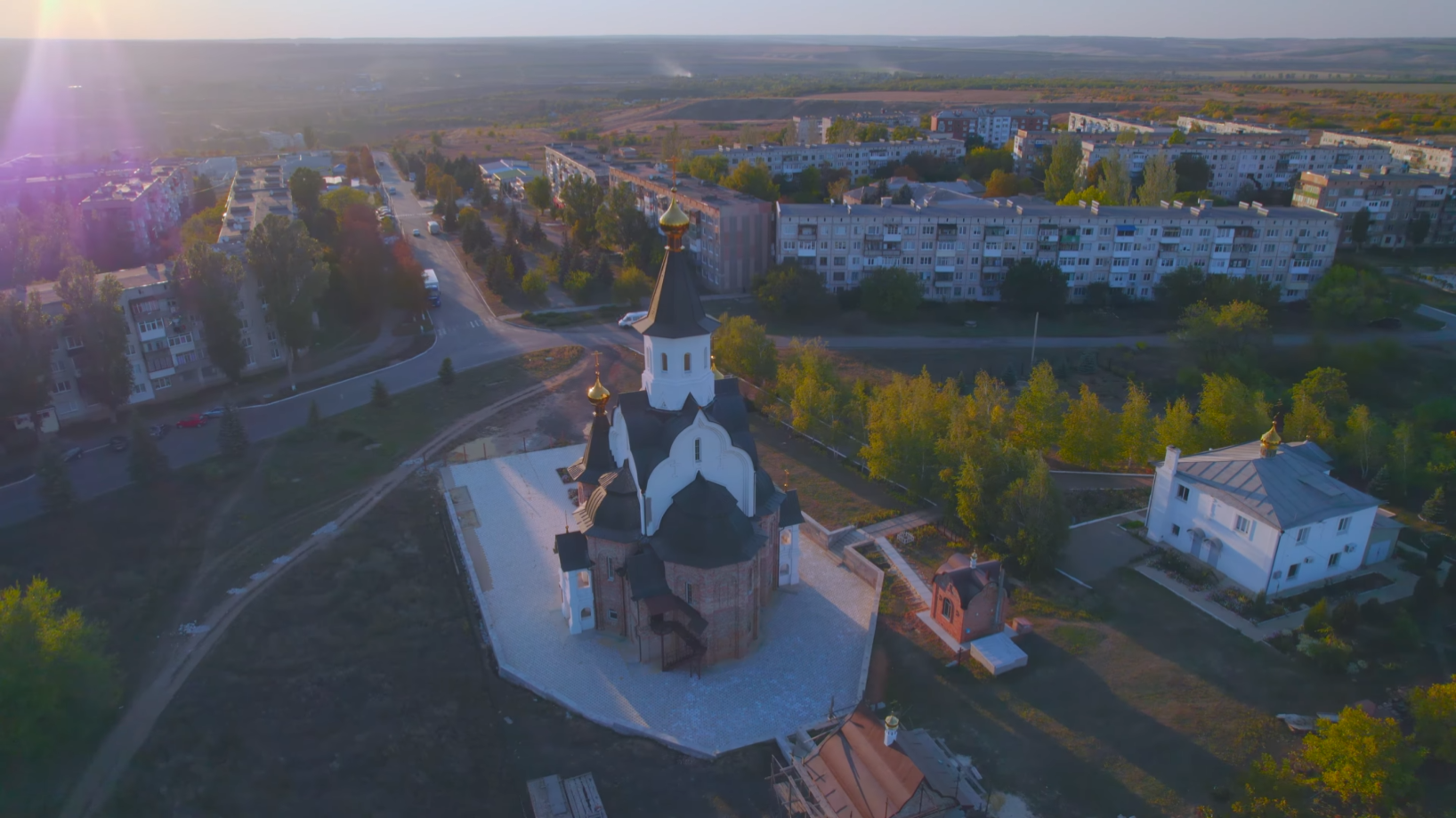
- The Holy Transfiguration Church of Soledar and surrounding buildings, pictured in April 2022

- Flag Coat of arms
- Interactive map of Soledar
- Location within Donetsk Oblast Location within Ukraine
- Coordinates: 48°41′43″N 38°04′03″E
- Country: Ukraine
- Oblast: Donetsk Oblast
- Raion: Bakhmut Raion
- Hromada: Soledar urban hromada
- Foundation: Late 17th century
- City status: 1965

Area
  - Total: 14.108 km^{2} (5.447 sq mi)
- Elevation: 100 m (330 ft)

Population (January 2022)
  - Total: 10,490
  - Estimate (2023): 0
  - Density: 743.5/km^{2} (1,926/sq mi)
- Postal code: 84545–84548
- Area code: +380 6274
- KOATUU: 1420910800

Soledar (Ukrainian: Соледар, IPA: [soleˈdɑr]; Russian: Соледар, IPA: [səlʲɪˈdar]; lit. 'gift of salt') is a destroyed city in Bakhmut Raion, Donetsk Oblast, Ukraine. Situated in the Donbas region of eastern Ukraine, the city was formerly highly important for its salt mining industry, from which its name Soledar is derived. The last estimate of its population before its destruction was 10,490, in 2022.

From 1925 until 1991, it was known as Karlo-Libknekhtovsk (Note: Russian: Карло-Либкнехтовск; Ukrainian: Карло-Лібкнехтівськ, romanized: Karlo-Libknekhtivsk) after the German socialist Karl Liebknecht. During the Battle of Soledar of the Russian invasion of Ukraine, Soledar was completely destroyed and depopulated by Russian forces, who have occupied the ruins of the city and the surrounding area since January 2023.

== History ==
=== Founding ===
During the second half of the 17th century, the Don Cossacks settled in the region of Donbas, building a village at the site that is now known as Soledar and naming it Brіantsіvka (Ukrainian: Брянцівка, Russian: Брянцовка). Salt mining on an industrial scale began in the settlement in 1881, by which time it was part of the Russian Empire. Over the following years, the scale of salt mining increased, and hundreds of workers came to work in the mines, and settle in the area.

=== 20th century ===
In 1925, during the Soviet period, several mining villages in the area were administratively merged into a new village named Karlo-Libknekhtovsk after the German socialist Karl Liebknecht. During World War II, Karlo-Libnekhtovsk was occupied by Nazi Germany starting in October 1941. Soviet partisans sabotaged the mines and factories as to not let the Nazis take advantage of them. The village was eventually liberated by the Soviet Red Army in September 1943. The salt mines were later restored and returned to full functionality. In 1965, Karlo-Libknekhtovsk received the status of a city.

In July 1991, Karlo-Libknekhtovsk changed its name to Soledar. This name literally means "a gift of salt" in the Russian language, reflecting its prominent salt-mining industry. Around 2,500 local people, approximately 1 in 4 of the settlement's population, were employed either in the salt mine, or related industries.

=== Russo-Ukrainian War ===
==== War in Donbas ====
In February 2014, the pro-Russian Ukrainian President Viktor Yanukovych was removed from power as a result of the Euromaidan protests and subsequent Revolution of Dignity. This caused a backlash in southern and eastern Ukraine. In mid-April 2014, local pro-Russian militias, refusing to recognise the new government, took control of swathes of settlements across the Donbas and proclaimed the creation of two breakaway states, the Donetsk People's Republic (DPR) and the Luhansk People's Republic. Soledar would remain under the control of pro-Russian rebels for around 3 months, without being a central theatre of events, as nearby Sloviansk and Donetsk were. On 21 July 2014, Ukrainian forces announced that they had retaken Soledar.

During the 2014–2022 years of the war in Donbas, Soledar was peaceful, and not a theatre of conflict. However, the events of 2014 accelerated Soledar's population decline, which fell from 14,600 in 1971 to 10,490 at the beginning of 2022. In August 2014, Soledar was used as the base for the identification team and OSCE observers dealing with the MH17 plane crash due to its proximity to the site. On 14 January 2015, the body of Ivan Reznichenko, a local council politician missing since June 2014, was found. The press service of political party Batkivshchyna said the criminals who killed him, who were now in custody, had been ordered to do so by the pro-Russian separatists while they controlled Soledar.

==== Russian invasion of Ukraine ====
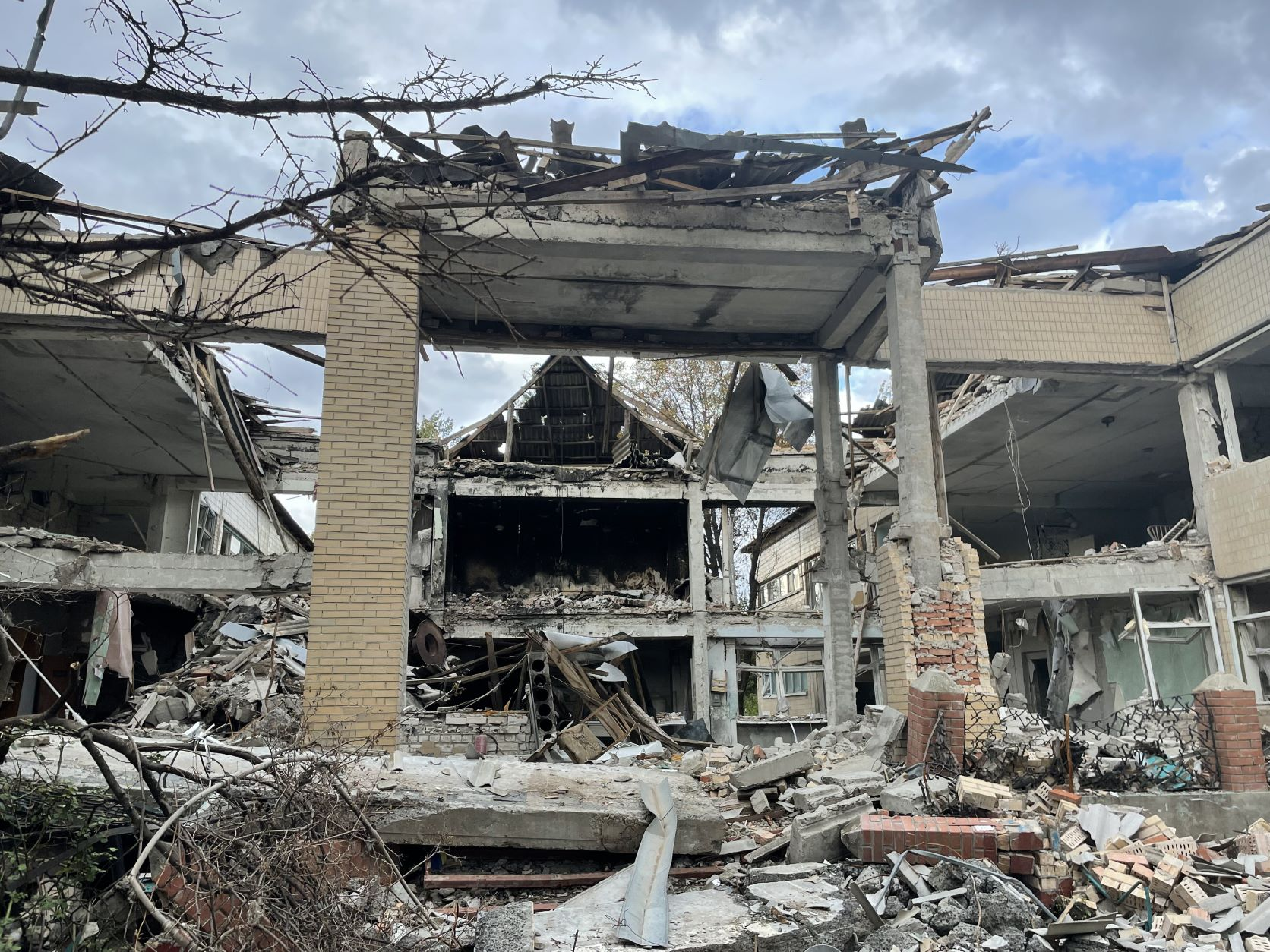
A ruined building in Soledar in September 2022

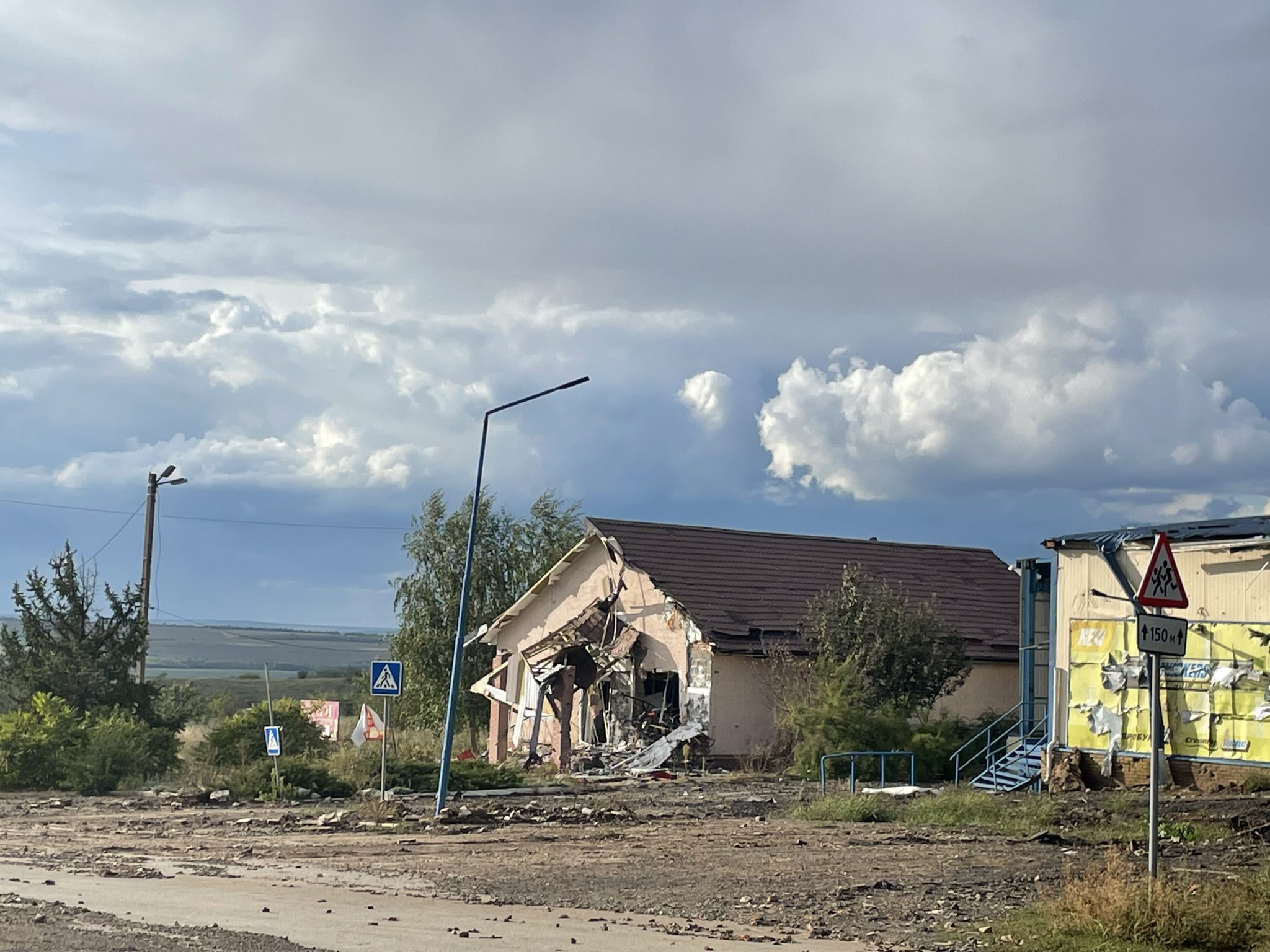
Destroyed houses in Soledar

During the full-scale 2022 Russian invasion of Ukraine, on 28 May 2022, it was reported that a Russian missile had hit the Artemsil salt plant in Soledar. The company's facilities and equipment were destroyed, its building left in ruins. It was the first time the company had closed since World War II. By the end of the month, Artemsil was forced to stop production due to constant Russian shelling. In July 2022, France 24 reported that Soledar was under constant shelling and was largely destroyed, with the remaining population of 2,000 people experiencing a dire living situation. "There are no more local authorities, no police, no doctors, no pharmacy. Everyone has left. We've been abandoned," a local resident said.

By August 2022, Soledar was estimated as "90 percent destroyed". The battle of Soledar began in intensity in early August 2022. In mid-August 2022, Soledar was visited by Ukrainian president Volodymyr Zelenskyy, who handed out state awards to Ukrainian soldiers there, and stated to them: "You will definitely win, and thanks to you, the whole of Ukraine will win". Yet by September, Russian forces had captured much of the eastern half of Soledar. Russia's momentum seemed to have stalled towards the end of 2022, however starting on 27 December 2022, the Russian Wagner Group began a breakthrough attempt to take the settlement and return it to the control of the Donetsk People Republic, which by then had been annexed by Russia. The battle descended into heavy attritional fighting, and was called the "most bloody battle" of the war at the time. Ukraine evacuated the remaining civilians of Soledar at the start of January, as Russia's Wagner forces moved in.

On January 11, 2023, after days of uncertainty as to whether Russia controlled the city, it was reported that Russia had definitively secured control of Soledar. By the end of the battle, the settlement was almost entirely destroyed, with Ukrainian president Volodymyr Zelenskyy saying that "barely any walls in Soledar remain[ed] standing". According to Donetsk Oblast governor Pavlo Kyrylenko, of the pre-invasion population of 10,490, only "559 civilians including 15 children" remained in the settlement by 13 January.

Analysts were divided over the value of Soledar, with some stating that a Russian victory in Soledar would be "pyrrhic at best". However, the capture of Soledar, Russia's first territorial gain since July 2022, gave Russia both a morale-boosting victory and territorial gain, arresting the pattern of Russian military reverses in the second half of 2022. Russian forces used Soledar as a staging post to press onto Bakhmut, which they took several months later, in May 2023.

Over the following months, Russia reported periodic Ukrainian attacks on Soledar, which it claimed to have repelled. Soledar remains in ruins, and as of 2024 is believed to be completely or nearly unpopulated.

== Geography ==
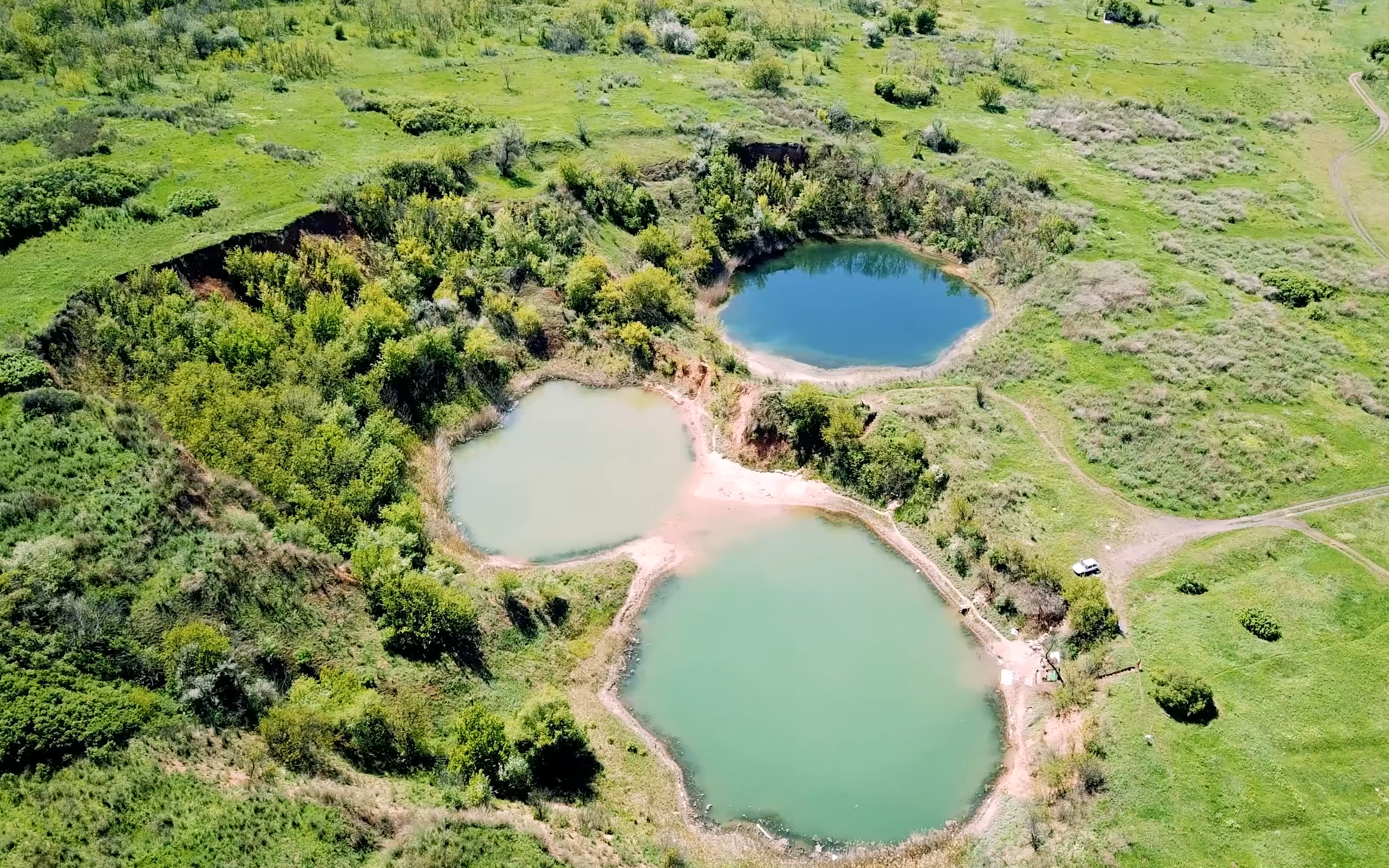
View of the lakes and the landscape near Soledar

Situated in the traditionally industrial Donbas region within eastern Ukraine, Soledar is located 18 km (11 mi) from the city of Bakhmut, 40 km (25 mi) from Sloviansk, 78 km (48 mi) from Donetsk, and 580 km (360 mi) from Kyiv.

There is a group of lakes on the edge of Soledar, some with a diameter of 100 metres (330 ft). Some of them have an "abnormally warm temperature" that can reach up to 40 °C (104 °F). Some are freshwater, while others are salty to the point that a person cannot dive deep, and gets pushed upwards.

== Economy ==
=== Salt and gypsum ===
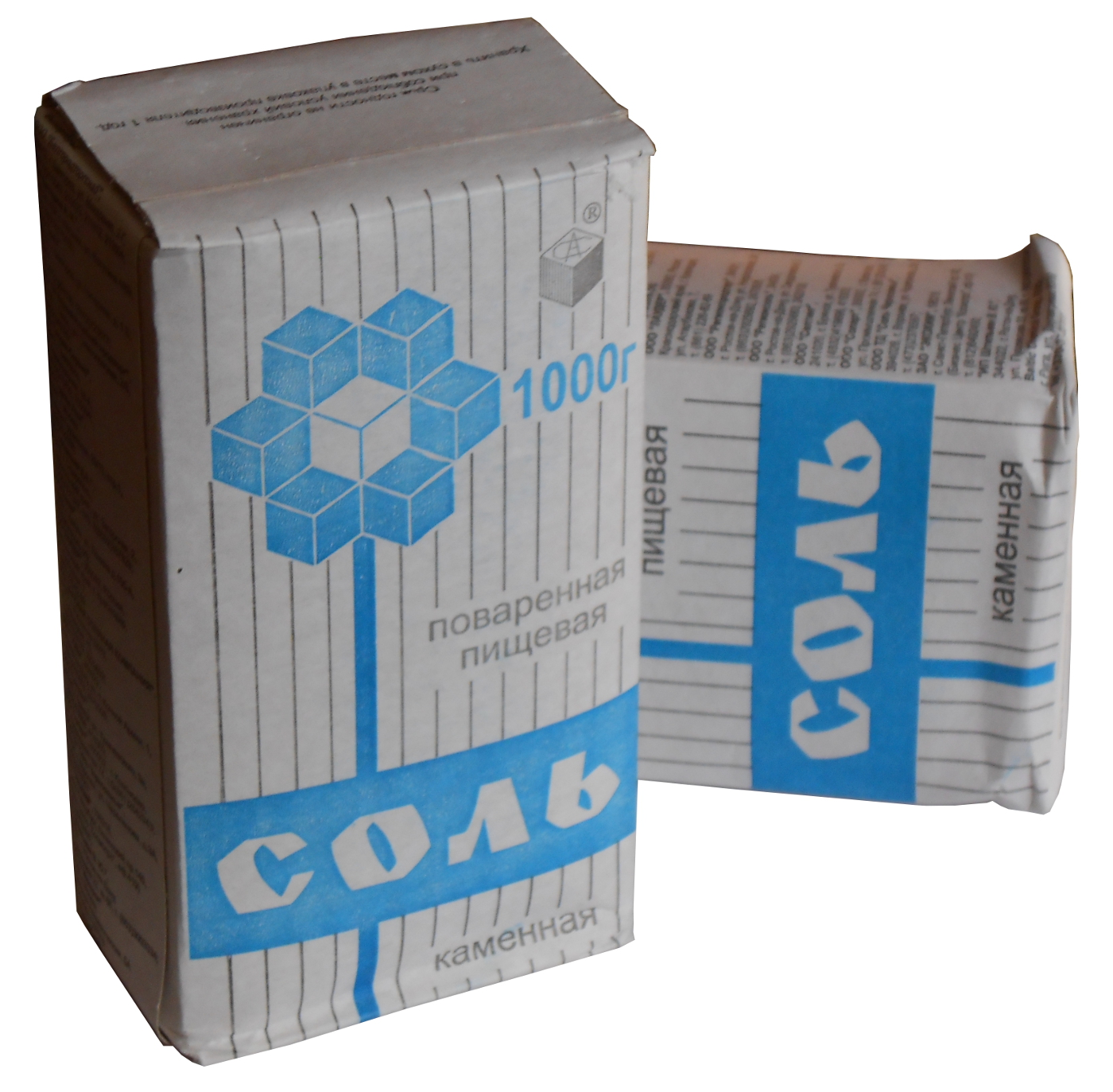
Two packages of Artemsil salt

Soledar's primary industry was the mining and processing of salt. Salt company Artemsil, founded in 1976, was the former owner of Soledar's salt industry, and said that the salt deposits of Soledar are "almost inexhaustible.... in 300 years of exploitation, the salt reserves have only decreased by one percent." There were estimated to be 5 billion tonnes of salt reserves in the Soledar salt mines, with the Soledar salt mine regarded as the largest salt mine in Europe. However Artemsil is now defunct, and the Soledar salt mine has not been in operation since May 2022.

In 2021, the mine provided around 95% of Ukraine's salt. Outside of Ukraine, the company exported salt to 22 countries, mostly in the former Soviet sphere, but also about 40 percent to Europe. Russia had been an important export destination in particular, with Artemsil having a 24 percent share of the Russian salt market until January 2015, when Russia suspended imports from the company due to the war in Donbas.

In early 2022, with the situation deteriorating in Soledar, Artemsil evacuated some of their workers, others left Soledar by their own means. Production of Artemsil salt stopped entirely in May 2022, and after existing supplies were exhausted, by summer of 2022 Artemsil salt was no longer to be found on shop shelves. In winter of 2022, the shafts of one of the mines were destroyed in the fighting, making the mine, at a depth of around 260 metres (850 ft) below the ground, inaccessible. A spokesperson for Ukraine’s Donetsk regional state administration said, in early 2023, that three of the main four caves of the mine have been damaged. After the Russian capture of the city, Donetsk People's Republic head Pushilin, in his late January 2023 visit, stated that the salt mines were "damaged and difficult to descend into". Pushilin has pledged that the salt mines will, in time, be restored, however there have been no further updates on this. There is no timetable for the resumption of tourist activities in the mines.

There is also an abundance of gypsum in Soledar, which was previously mined, as it is useful for construction materials. The Germany-based company Knauf Gips Donbas owns a factory in Soledar that produced plasterboard, and into which they invested tens of millions of dollars. The factory closed in early 2022.

=== Salt mine tourism ===
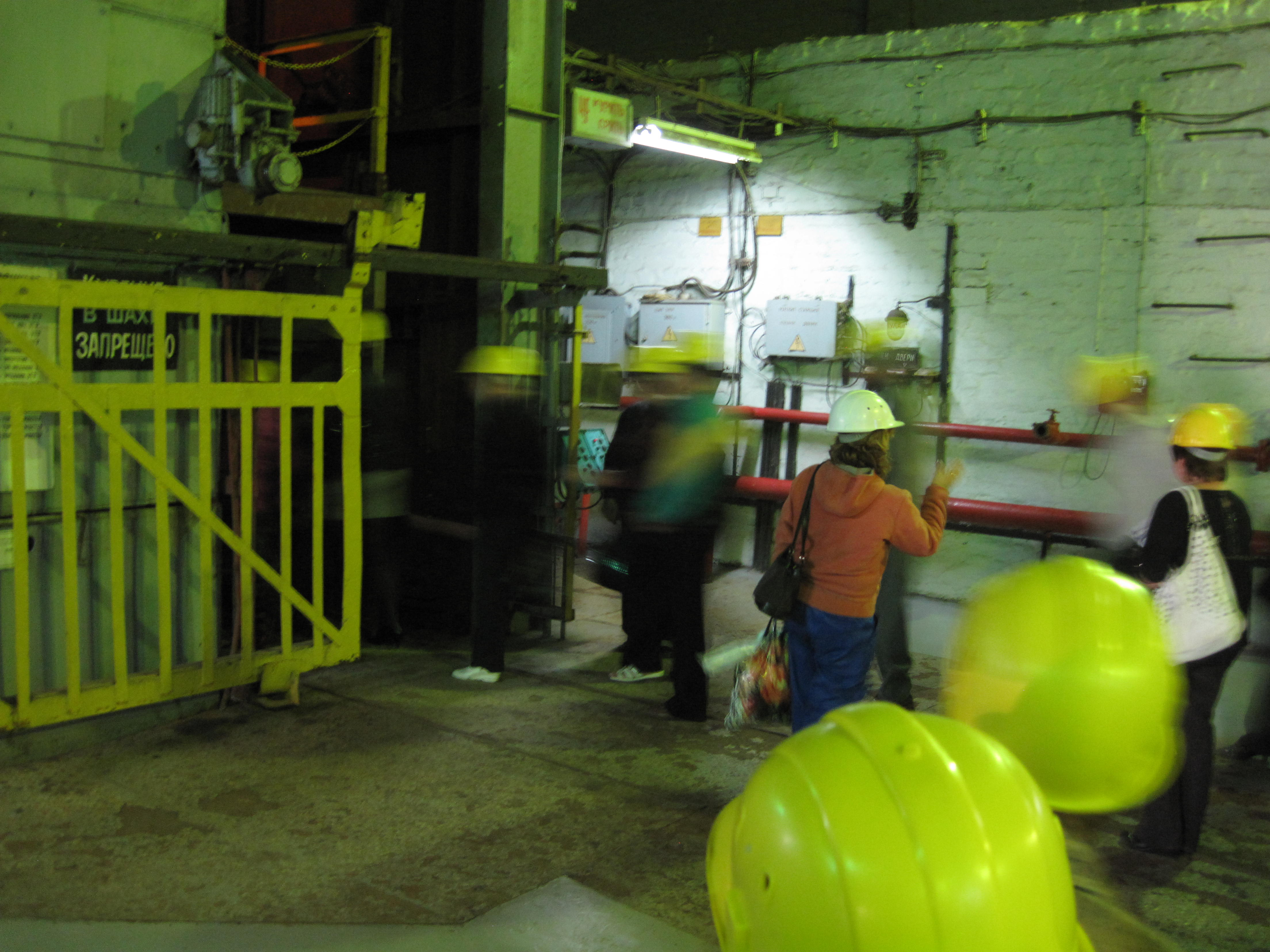
Tourists at the salt mine entrance

Soledar's salt-mining industry created an "underground city" of caves, and tunnels that Deutsche Welle described as a "magnet for tourists" prior to the Russian invasion of Ukraine. Guided tours went to as deep as 200–300 metres (660–980 ft), with attractions including sculptures made of salt crystals, a museum, and a church. The expansive tunnels have been the site of numerous publicity stunts and events, including classical music concerts, a soccer match, and the first ever underground hot air balloon flight.

Since the early 1990s, the chambers have also contained "speleosanatoriums": rooms made of salt that attempt to "recreate the allegedly restorative conditions of salt mines", where 100 patients with respiratory diseases are treated. This practice is part of the controversial halotherapy industry, in which it is believed that the inhalation of salt dust is a "miracle cure for respiratory illnesses".

=== Transport ===
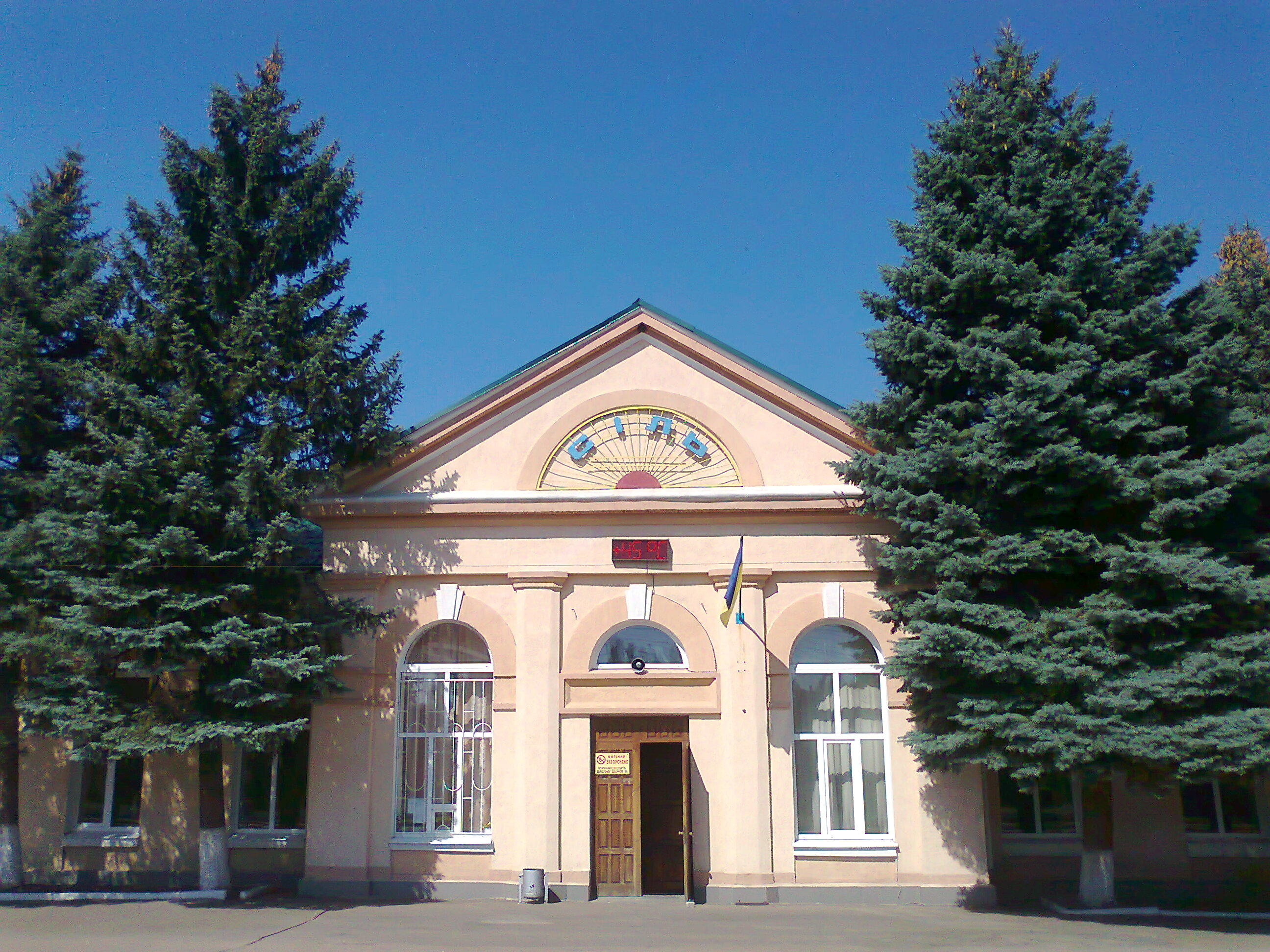
The Sil railway station

The Sil (Ukrainian: Сіль; Russian: Соль, romanized: Sol, both literally translated as "Salt") railway station is located 3 kilometres (1.9 miles) northwest of the center of Soledar. It was formerly an urban-type settlement of its own until 1999 when the Verkhovna Rada officially declared it administratively subordinate to Soledar. The large railway station served as an essential hub station for shipping out Soledar's salt. The last shipment of Soledar salt went out in May 2022.

The Dekonska (Ukrainian: Деконська) railway station, located 2 kilometres (1.2 miles) to the south of the centre of Soledar, is another formerly separate settlement that is now part of the city.

== Science ==
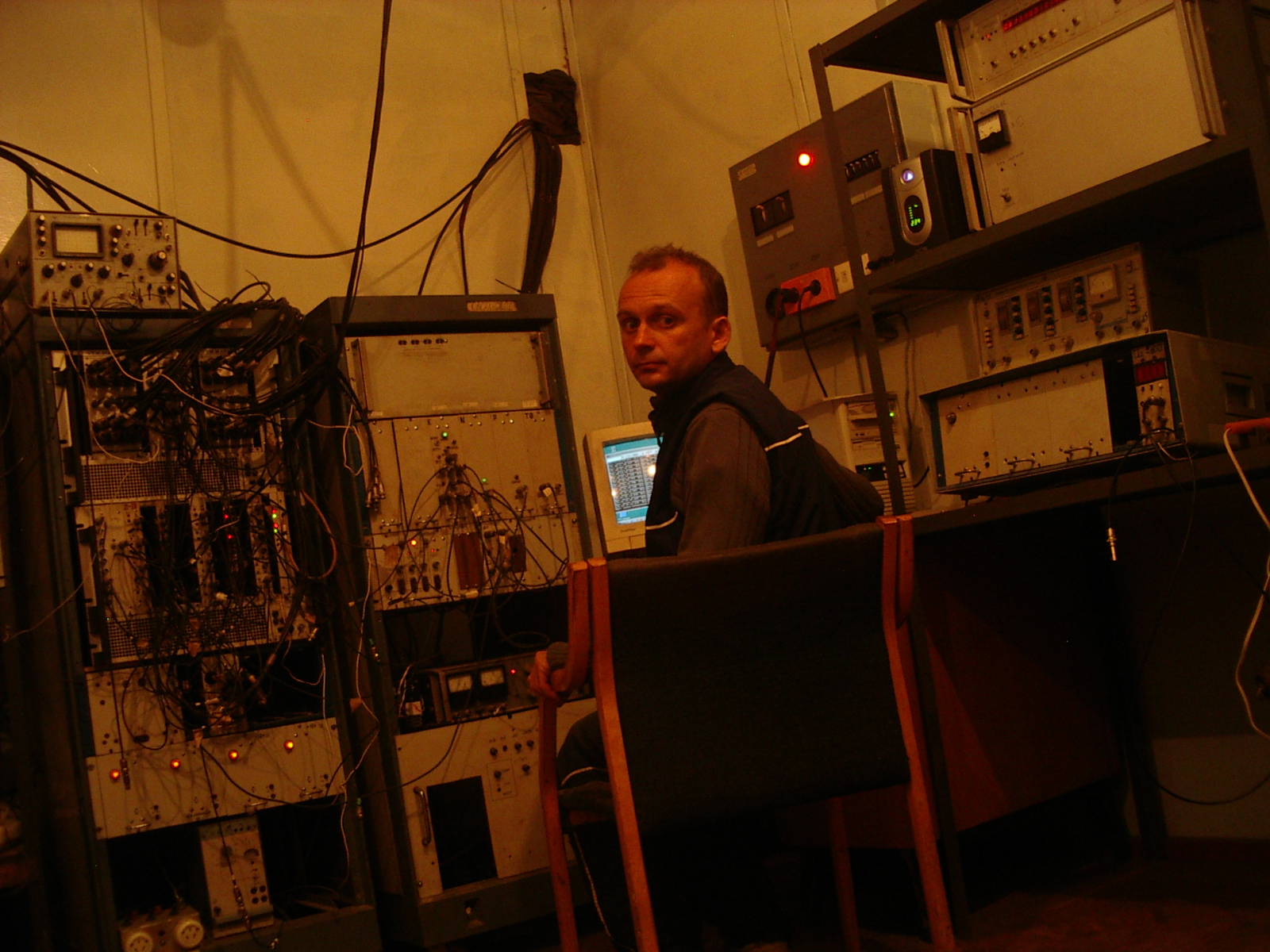
A scientist in the mine

From November 1977, the Artyomovsk Scintillation Detector has been located in Soledar salt mine, operating at a depth of 570 metres (1,870 ft). Its main purpose is to detect neutrino radiation from collapsing stars. This location inside the salt mine was chosen because the "natural-radioactivity background in salt is approximately 300 times lower than in ordinary rock," thus minimizing radiation noise.

In 2000, a Ukrainian scientist proposed using Soledar's salt mines as a nuclear waste disposal site, believing that the inert environment would be useful. However residents of Soledar and the surrounding area, including Bakhmut, opposed the proposal, holding rallies and writing letters to authorities. Eventually, regional authorities said that the plan would not be implemented.

On 15 March 2005, the Donetsk Oblast Council gave the Institute for Nuclear Research of the Russian Academy of Sciences the right to use 0.63 hectares of area in the mine and the station for research. At this time, the station had 11 employees.

== Demographics ==
Historical population

Year	Pop.	±% p.a.
1971	14,600	—
1991	12,200	−0.89%
2001	13,182	+0.78%
2012	11,799	−1.00%

Year	Pop.	±% p.a.
2022	10,490	−1.17%
2023	550	−94.76%
2024	0	−100.00%

Soledar's population has fallen over the past few decades, from 14,600 in 1971 to 10,490 in 2022, and only an estimated 550 as of early 2023. As of 2024, Soledar is believed to be unpopulated.

In terms of ethnicity, at the time of the 2001 census, over 80% of the town's population were ethnic Ukrainians and notable minorities were Russians, Belarusians and Armenians.

The native language of Soledar's population, as of the Ukrainian Census of 2001: Ukrainian 60.10%, Russian 39.43%, Armenian 0.11%, Belarusian 0.09%, Romani 0.05%, Bulgarian 0.02%, Moldovan 0.02%, and one person each for Greek, Karaim, Polish and Romanian (0.01%).

Ethnic groups in Soledar in 2001
	percent
Ukrainians	82.22%
Russians	16.18%
Belarusians	0.34%
Armenians	0.17%
Moldovans	0.08%
Ukrainian Greeks	0.08%

Native languages in Soledar in 2001
	percent
Ukrainian	60.10%
Russian	39.43%
Armenian	0.11%
Belarusian	0.09%
Romani	0.05%
Bulgarian	0.02%
others	0.03%

== Notable people ==
- Horden Brova, volleyball player
- Peter N. Fedorov, astronomer
- Anna Stetsenko, Paralympic swimmer
