= Pavlo Vigderhaus =

Soviet architect (1925–2013)

Pavlo Isaakovich Vigderhaus
- Born: September 7, 1925; Artemivsk, Donetsk Oblast, Ukrainian SSR, Soviet Union
- Died: February 11, 2013 (aged 87); Donetsk, Ukraine
- Occupation: Architect
- Awards: USSR State Prize (1978) title Honoured Architect of Ukraine (2009)
- Buildings: Monument to a Miner, Miner's Square (Donetsk) Church of the Nativity, Fallen Communars square (Donetsk), monument to Lenin (Gorlovka)

Pavlo Isaakovich Vigderhaus (Ukrainian: Павло Ісаакович Вігдергауз, Russian: Павел Исаакович Вигдергауз, September 7, 1925 – February 11, 2013) was a Soviet and Ukrainian architect, recipient of the USSR State Prize (1978) and Honoured Architect of Ukraine (2009).

== Biography ==
Vigderhaus was born to a Jewish family on September 7, 1925, in Artemivsk, in the Donetsk region in the family of a journalist. Since his father was working in different cities of Donetsk and Lugansk regions, the family had to move permanently. The war found them in Makeyevka. In October 1941, Vigderhaus with his mother were evacuated to Kizel, Perm Krai, Russia. In Kizel Vigderhaus worked as a turner at the munitions factory, that was evacuated from Kiev.

In January 1943 he was called up to the Soviet Army and sent for training to the military infantry school. After six months of training, Vigderhaus was referred to the Guards 349 at 105th Guards Vienna Airborne Division, that was fighting in Hungary and Austria within 3rd Ukrainian Front. He was wounded in one of the battles for Vienna and discharged after treatment.

Vigderhaus dreamt of becoming an architect from the time that he was a schoolboy; shortly upon demobilization, he was walking through Stalino destroyed during the war, and saw an officer, who was drawing sketches of ruins. Vigderhaus came closer and learned that this man was an architect and was taking building measurements for its reconstruction. Vigderhaus shared his dream with this man and he invited Vigderhaus to work to Oblast planning department (Oblproekt) as an assistant architect.

In 1947, thanks to work in Oblproekt he met already known Donetsk architects A. Strashnov and A. Kuznetsov. They advised him to go to Kharkov and enter the institute. Vigderhaus followed their advice and together with his friend entered the Kharkov Institute of Civil Engineering and graduated from it in 1953.

In 1957, Vigderhaus became a member of the USSR Union of Architects. During almost 60 years dedicated to architecture, Vigderhaus has created most part of the buildings in contemporary Donetsk, including monument "To Miner's Glory" (1967), which is considered the unofficial symbol of Donetsk

In 1978, Vigderhaus was awarded the State Prize of USSR for landscape architecture in design - that was 8 years later after UNESCO had recognized Donetsk as the greenest industrial city in the world

Vigderhaus had one son and three grandchildren.

== Selected works ==
- stadium "Shakhtar" (Gorlovka)
- administrative and laboratory buildings of "Ukrniisol" institute (Artemovsk)
- residential area "Semenovka" (Donetsk)
- experimental school for 2032 students in Donetsk (together with architects I. Karakis, V. Volik, A. Strashnov, mosaic compositions by G. Sinitsa and V. Zaretsky)
- building of "Donchanka" shop (Donetsk)
- Monument to a Miner (Donetsk) (together with Konstantin Rakityansky). The Symbol of Donetsk, "Miner" that is standing now on Miner's Square was initially a bronze statuette, called "The heat and the light we bring to people" intended for Khrushchev, who was supposed to come to Donetsk. But the visit of the Soviet leader was canceled for some reason and later the statue was built based on the statuette sketch. Vidgerhaus received nothing for this project.
- building of the center of consumer appliances and radiotechnics (Donetsk)
- monuments to Lenin (Kramatorsk and Gorlovka)
- office building (Yasinovataya)
- housing complex "Parkovy" (Donetsk)
- cardiology ward building at Oblast Central Clinical Hospital (Donetsk)
- maternity hospital (Artemovsk)
- tax office building (Artemovsk)
- Church of the Nativity, Fallen Communars square (Donetsk) was designed by ethnic Jew Pavlo Vigderhaus and built by Armenians and Turks, that contradicts the Orthodox dogma - Orthodox community have no right to trust the construction of the church to adherents of a different faith. Yet Hilarion, Metropolitan of Donetsk and Mariupol made an exception and issued a permission
- supermarkets belonging to Zasyadko mine
- monument "To Holocaust Victims" on Lenin Ave. (Donetsk) (together with Yuri Baldin)

also, Vigderhaus is the author of numerous residential buildings in Donetsk and Donetsk Oblast'.

== Awards and titles ==
- Order For Courage, other war awards
- State Prize of USSR (1978)
- Honoured Architect of Ukraine
