= Oleksii Reva =

Ukrainian politician (born 1953)

- Олексій Рева

Mayor of Bakhmut
- In office April 1991 – present (de jure) (Note: Due to Russian victory following the Battle of Bakhmut, Reva does not currently have de facto control)
- Preceded by: None

Head of Bakhmut City Council
- In office 9 April 1990 – present

Personal details
- Born: May 8, 1953 (age 73) Bakhmut, Donetsk Oblast, Soviet Ukraine
- Citizenship: Soviet Union; Ukraine
- Party: Independent
- Education: Ukrainian Correspondence Polytechnic Institute, Donetsk Academy of Management and Public Administration
- Profession: Politician
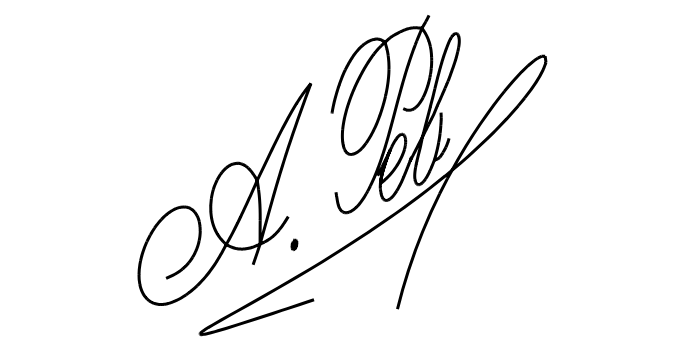
- Signature

Oleksii Oleksandrovych Reva (Ukrainian: Олексій Олександрович Рева; born 8 May 1953) is a Ukrainian politician and mayor of Bakhmut since 1991.

== Early life ==
Oleksii Reva was born on 8 May 1953 in the city of Artemivsk (now Bakhmut). He first graduated from the Ukrainian Correspondence Polytechnic Institute with a degree in mechanical engineering, and later from Donetsk Academy of Management and Public Administration with a degree in economics.

== Career ==
=== Early positions ===
From 1971 to 1974, Reva served in the Northern Fleet, and returned to his hometown after his service. He then began working at a local machine-building plant as an apprentice welder. He then became deputy head and later head of the production shop.

=== Mayor of Bakhmut ===
Reva became head of the Bakhmut City Council on 9 April 1990 and began his tenure as mayor of Bakhmut a year later, in April 1991.

In 2021, Reva officially became recognized as the longest-serving mayor in Ukrainian history.

Following the Russian invasion of Ukraine in February 2022, Reva began efforts to help residents of Bakhmut in wartime, including accommodations for healthcare and educational facilities. As the situation worsened, Reva began organizing evacuations to areas farther west, mostly west of the Dnipro river. Reva estimated that as of June 2023, only 500 out of 80,000 pre-war residents remained in the city. Reva admitted that in his 30+ years as mayor, he never thought that Ukraine would be at war with Russia, and that Bakhmut is now in "ruins and ashes". He also believes that Ukraine will win this war, and be able to rebuild everything, including Bakhmut.
