= Artemsil =

Ukrainian salt company

- Founded: 1976
- Headquarters: Ukraine

Artemsil (Ukrainian: Артемсіль) or Artemsol (Russian: Артёмсоль) is a temporarily defunct state-owned industrial association for salt production in the Donetsk oblast, Ukraine, one of the largest in the world. It ceased its operations in May 2022 due to the facilities being partially destroyed by Russian forces advancing in the region.

== History ==
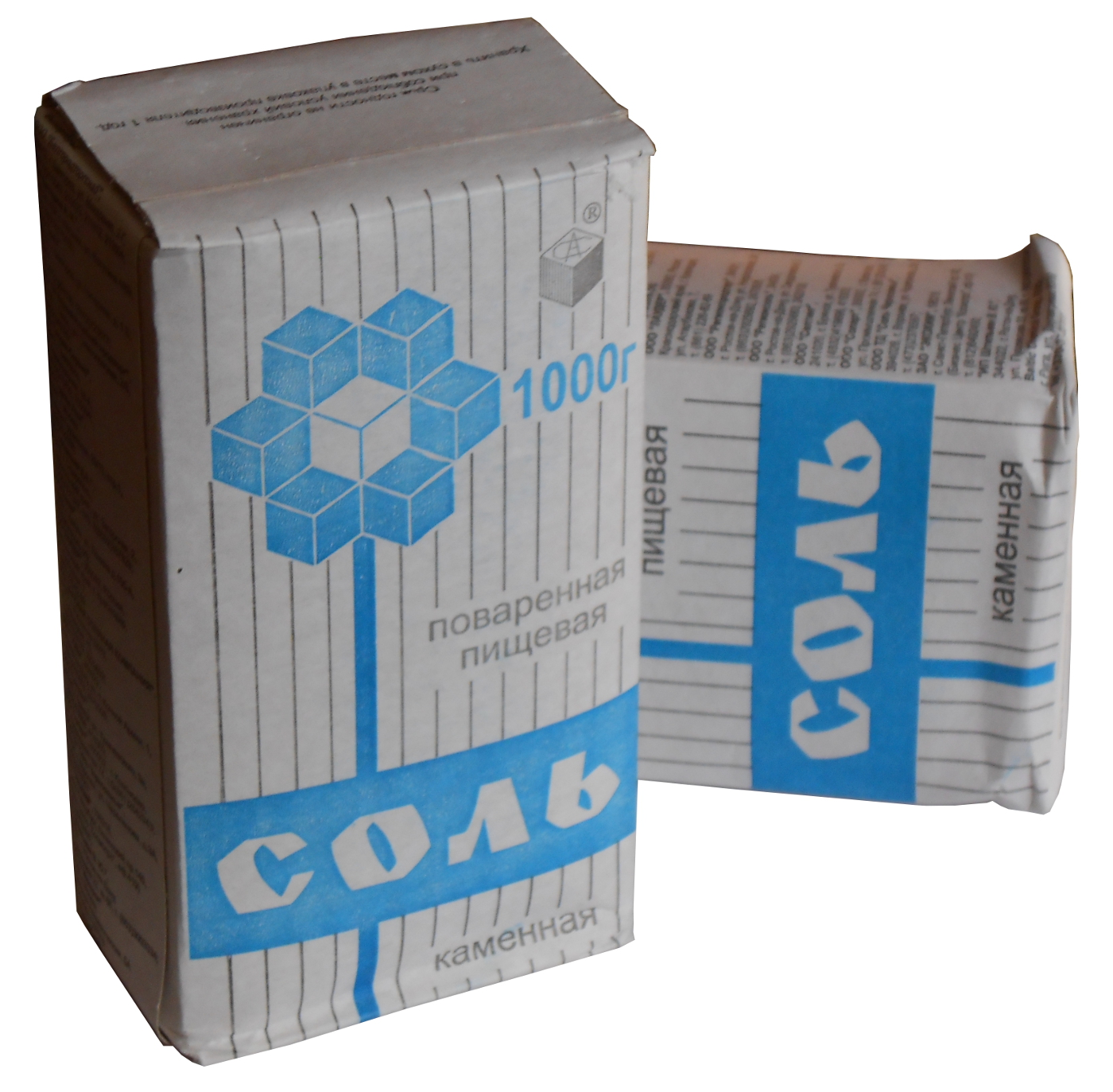
Packages of Artemsil salt

Artemsil was formed in 1976. It consists of five mines with a complete cycle of salt production, auxiliary services, significant housing and social funds. The number of workers is 3,780. Production activity has been counted since 1881, when the Bryantsev mine was put into operation. Mine No. 1 has been in operation since 1898. The administrative center is the city of Soledar. From 2016 to 2019, the company was in a series of legal issues. The first time was when in 2016 the National Anti-Corruption Bureau began an investigation into the company after it was found that Artemsil was selling its products to a few intermediary firms rather than directly, with these firms receiving a discount. It was found that one firm under this program was selling the salt it bought for two to threee times the retail price. In November 2017, the bank accounts of Artmesil were all frozen over a contract dispute with KPVI "Pamyat", and then in the following year, the Antimonopoly Committee of Ukraine fined the company 13.4 million hryvnias for abusing its position as a monopoly by charging different prices. In December 2019, the last time this occurred, the State Bureau of Investigation revealed that they had uncovered a bribery scheme.

On March 3, 2020, it was decided to put "Artemsil" up for privatization through an auction, but at the end of the same year, the enterprise was removed from the list of objects allowed for privatization. In 2021, shortly thereafter, it was reported that Artemsil had shipped out 1.9 million tons of salt that year, which was a 60% increase from 2020.

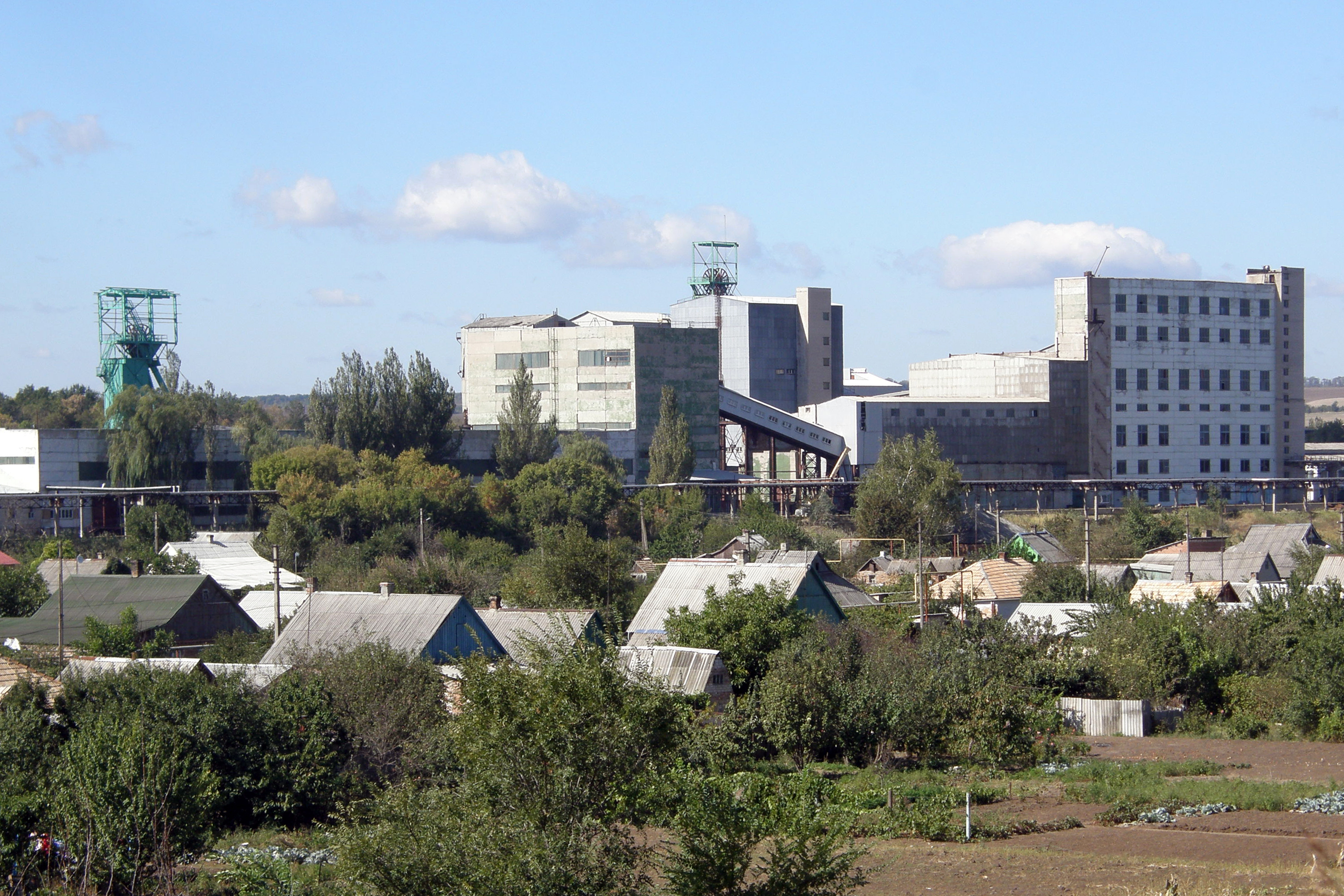
Salt mine No. 4

=== Russian invasion of Ukraine ===
Just before the war, the company employed around 2,500 people, which was significantly lower than prior to 2016 when it was 3,700 since the company had lost access to its previous Russian market after Russia banned imports of Ukrainian salt in 2016. In the second half of May 2022 Russian forces approached Soledar, attempting to surround the Defense Forces of Ukraine in Sievierodonetsk and Lysychansk. Due to constant shelling, the work of the enterprise was stopped on 15 June 2022. The administrative building was partially destroyed, mines and warehouses were hit. The railway, which Artemsil primarily used to transport salt, was also constantly being shelled, preventing shipments to other parts of the country. In addition, most of the residents of Soledar had evacuated by this time, including most employees.

After the company stopped its operation in Soledar, they administratively re-registered in Kyiv. In February 2023, the Ukrainian government sold 100,000 packs of Artemsil salt (20 tons in total) for $12.5 each, to fund FPV drones for its army via the United24 website. Due to the limited production, Artemsil salt has become very scarce, selling at highly inflated prices in Ukraine. Old-stock packages on the private market were reselling for as much as 10,000 hryvnias. NOVUS, a supermarket chain in Kyiv, also sold a limited run in mid-2024 of 500-gram packs of Artemsil under the name "Volia" for 200 hryvnias to also purchase FPV drones.

== Products and destinations ==
The association "Artemsil" extracts and processes the mineral halite, providing the population and industry with table rock salt, and metallurgy, the chemical industry, agriculture and other industries with high-quality and cheap sodium chloride for industrial use. In 2017, they also announced they would begin producing purified salt which met European quality standards by the end of the year. The company extracts about 70 percent of Ukraine's salt. The facility also exported its product to European countries such Hungary, Poland, Georgia, and Moldova. In Hungary, most of its deliveries went to the company BorsodChem. Their salt supply, following a memorandum in 2018, also goes to both the state institutions of the State Agency of Automobile Roads of Ukraine and Ukrzaliznytsia in order to help with road maintenance during the winter.
