= Artwinery =

Winery in Ukraine

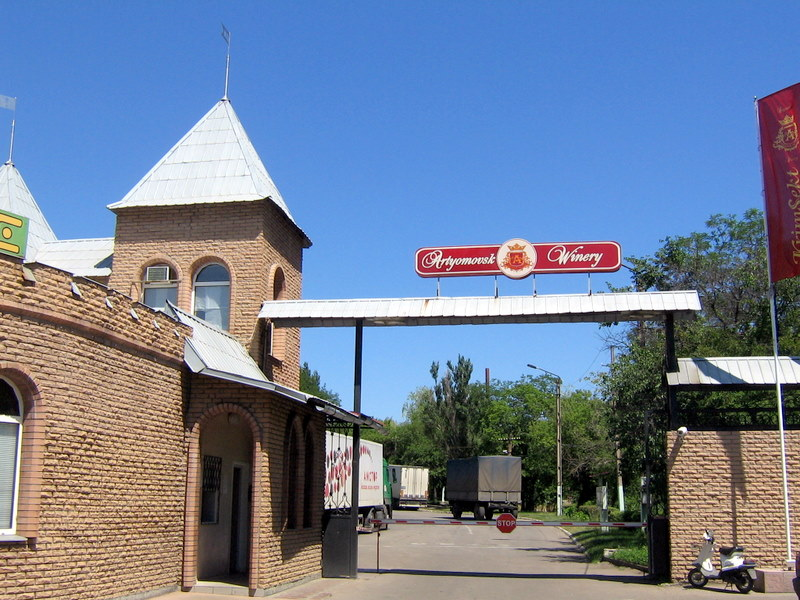
- Artwinery entrance in 2008
- Location: Tairove, Odesa Oblast, Ukraine (2023-present); Bakhmut, Donetsk Oblast, Ukraine (until 2023)
- Opened to the public: 1950
- Key people: Ihor Leonidovych Akhmetov (owner); Ihor Eduardovych Tolkachov (director)
- Known for: sparkling wine
- Website: artwinery.com.ua

Artwinery (full name, Private Joint-Stock Company "Artwinery", abbr. PrJSC "Artwinery", formerly known as Artemivsk Sparkling Wine Plant and Artemivsk Winery) is one of the largest enterprises in Ukraine and Eastern Europe for the production of sparkling wines using the classic bottling method. It was located in the city of Bakhmut (previously called Artemivsk) in Donetsk Oblast, eastern Ukraine. Following the Russian invasion of Ukraine, in which Bakhmut became the site of heavy warfare and underwent significant damage, Artwinery relocated to Odesa Oblast in southwest Ukraine in 2023.

== History ==
=== Artemivsk Champagne Factory ===
The company was established in 1950, when a decision was made to create a factory for the production of classic sparkling wine in the gypsum tunnels of the city of Bakhmut. The conditions in the underground tunnels were suitable for this purpose, with a constant temperature of 13–14 °C, humidity of 85–90%, and a large area of 26 hectares.

== See also ==
- Economy of Ukraine
- List of companies of Ukraine
